= John Cardoza =

Broadway actor

John Cardoza (born c. 1994) is an American actor and singer. He is best known for originating the role of Younger Noah in The Notebook and starring as Christian in Moulin Rouge!, both on tour and on Broadway.

== Life and Career ==
John Cardoza grew up in southeastern Massachusetts. He was a competitive figure skater for 15 years. He studied musical theater at the Boston Conservatory of Music.

Cardoza made his Broadway debut in the ensemble of Jagged Little Pill in 2019. In 2022, after starring as Daniel in a musical adaptation of The Karate Kid in St. Louis, he originated the role of Younger Noah in the premiere of The Notebook in Chicago. In 2023, Cardoza starred in the U.S. national tour of Moulin Rouge! as Christian, earning positive reviews.

He reprised the role of Younger Noah when The Notebook debuted on Broadway in March 2024, leaving the show that October to join the Broadway cast of Moulin Rouge! from October 2024 until April 13, 2025. He returned to the Moulin Rouge! North American tour later that year to reprise his role for performances in Mexico and California.

He joined the cast of Heathers, taking on the role of J.D. on April 27th, 2026 and stayed with the cast until the closing of Heathers on October 11th, 2026.

== Personal life ==
Cardoza is openly queer.

== Stage Credits ==
Year(s)	Production	Role	Location	Category
2017	Next to Normal	Gabe	TheaterWorks Hartford	Regional
2018	Jagged Little Pill	Ensemble u/s Nick Healy u/s Phoenix	American Repertory Theater	Out-of-town tryout
2019–2021	Jagged Little Pill	Ensemble u/s Nick Healy u/s Phoenix	Broadhurst Theatre	Broadway
2022	The Karate Kid	Daniel LaRusso	Stages St. Louis	Regional
2022	The Notebook	Younger Noah	Chicago Shakespeare Theater	Regional
2023	Moulin Rouge! The Musical	Christian		US national tour
2024	The Notebook	Younger Noah	Gerald Schoenfeld Theatre	Broadway
2024–2025	Moulin Rouge! The Musical	Christian	Al Hirschfeld Theatre	Broadway
2025	Moulin Rouge! The Musical	Christian		US national tour
2026	Heathers: The Musical	Jason “J.D.” Dean	New World Stages	Off-Broadway
