= Maryann Plunkett =

American actress and singer

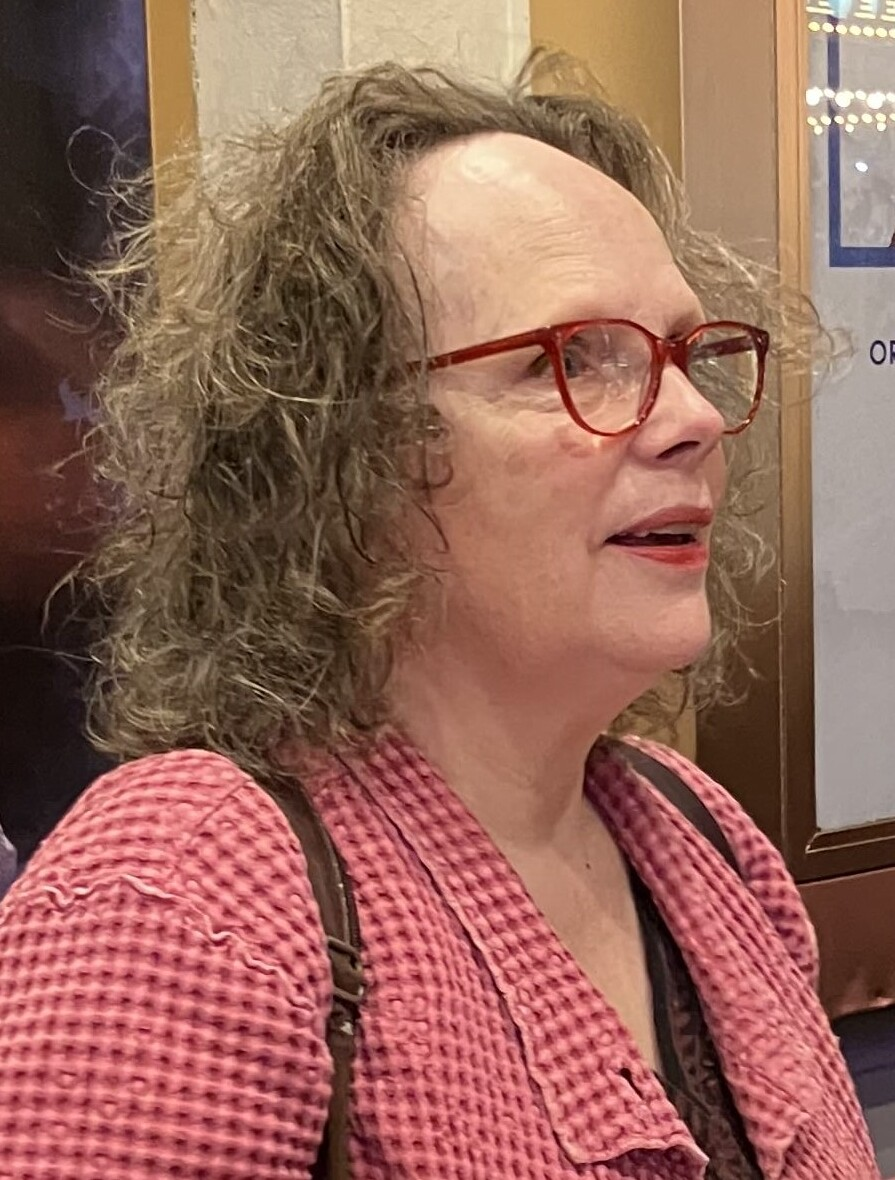
- Plunkett in 2024
- Education: University of New Hampshire
- Occupation: Actress
- Years active: 1982–present
- Spouse: Jay O. Sanders (m. 1991)
- Children: 1

Maryann Plunkett is an American actress and singer.

Plunkett made her Broadway debut playing Sister Agnes in Agnes of God. In 1987, she won the Tony Award for Best Leading Actress in a Musical for her performance as Sally Smith in Me and My Girl. In 2024, she received her second Tony Award nomination for her leading role in the musical adaptation of The Notebook. In addition, she has made appearances in various films and series such as Little Women, Manifest, A Beautiful Day in the Neighborhood, and Dr. Death.

== Career ==
Plunkett graduated from the University of New Hampshire, and was a founding member of Portland Stage repertory company in Maine. She appeared on Broadway as Bernadette Peters's replacement in the role of Dot in Sunday in the Park with George in 1985. In 1987, she won the Tony Award for Best Leading Actress in a Musical for her performance as Sally Smith in Me and My Girl.

She appeared in the 1991 Broadway revival of Arthur Miller's The Crucible, in which she played Elizabeth Proctor opposite Martin Sheen as John Proctor, in an all-star cast including Michael York and Fritz Weaver. She was part of the Tony Randall's National Actors Theatre company, and performed in their production of Saint Joan by George Bernard Shaw in 1993 on Broadway. She performed in the National Actors Theatre productions of A Little Hotel on the Side by Georges Feydeau and Maurice Desvallières on Broadway in 1992, and in The Seagull by Anton Chekov in 1992.

Plunkett appeared in the television movies The Littlest Victims and Breaking the Silence, and in feature films including Claire Dolan and The Company Men. She guest-starred on episodes of Matlock, L.A. Law, Murder She Wrote, Miami Vice, Star Trek: The Next Generation, and Law & Order.

She and her husband, actor Jay O. Sanders, appeared together in all four of Richard Nelson's The Apple Family Plays: That Hopey Changey Thing, Sweet and Sad, Sorry, and Regular Singing. They premiered at the Off-Broadway The Public Theater in 2010, 2011, 2012, and 2013 respectively.

Plunkett was nominated for the 2013 Drama Desk Award for Outstanding Featured Actress in a Play for her performance as Barbara Apple in Sorry. Sweet and Sad won the 2012 Drama Desk Award for Outstanding Ensemble Performance and the 2012 Obie Award for Ensemble Performance. The Apple Family Plays played in repertory at The Public Theater from October 22, 2013, to December 15, 2013.

Plunkett and Sanders appeared in all three productions of Richard Nelson's second play cycle, The Gabriels: Election Year in the Life of One Family, which premiered at The Public Theater. Plunkett portrayed Mary Gabriel and Sanders portrayed George Gabriel, her brother-in-law. The first play, Hungry, premiered in March 2016. The second play, What Did You Expect?, ran from September 10, 2016, to October 9, 2016. The third and final play, Women of a Certain Age, opened on election night, November 8, 2016, and ran through December 4, 2016.

In 2024, she won an Obie Award for her performance as Ella in the Off-Broadway play Deep Blue Sound by Abe Koogler.

== Personal life ==
She and Jay O. Sanders were married in 1991. They met while acting on the television series A Man Called Hawk. They have a son, Jamie.

== Work ==
=== Stage productions ===
Year	Production	Role	Notes
1982	Agnes of God	Sister Agnes	Broadway replacement & US national tour
1985	Sunday in the Park with George	Dot & Marie	Broadway replacement
1986	Me and My Girl	Sally Smith	Broadway, Tony Award for Best Actress in a Musical
1991	The Crucible	Elizabeth Proctor	Broadway revival
1992	A Little Hotel on the Side	Marcelle Paillardin	Broadway revival
1992	The Master Builder	Kaja Fosli	Broadway revival
1992	The Seagull	Masha	Broadway revival
1993	Saint Joan	Joan	Broadway revival
2007	The Autumn Garden	Rose Griggs	Williamstown Theatre Festival
2008	A Man for All Seasons	Alice More	Broadway revival
2010	That Hopey Changey Thing	Barbara Apple	As part of The Apple Family Plays, world premiere, The Public Theater
2011	Sweet and Sad	Barbara Apple	As part of The Apple Family Plays, world premiere, The Public Theater, Drama Desk Award for Outstanding Ensemble and Obie Award for Ensemble Performance
2012	Sorry	Barbara Apple	As part of The Apple Family Plays, world premiere, The Public Theater, Drama Desk Award for Outstanding Featured Actress in a Play nomination
2013	Regular Singing	Barbara Apple	As part of The Apple Family Plays, world premiere, The Public Theater
2016	The Gabriels: Election Year in the Life of One Family	Mary Gabriel	World premiere, The Public Theater
2019	Juno and the Paycock	Juno Boyle	As part of The O'Casey Cycle, Irish Repertory Theatre
2019	The Plough and the Stars	Bessie Burgess	As part of The O'Casey Cycle, Irish Repertory Theatre
2022	The Notebook	Older Allison "Allie" Calhoun (née Nelson)	World premiere, Chicago Shakespeare Theater
2023	Deep Blue Sound	Ella	World premiere, Clubbed Thumb, Obie Award for Performance
2024	The Notebook	Older Allison "Allie" Calhoun (née Nelson)	Broadway, Tony Award for Best Actress in a Musical nomination
2025	Deep Blue Sound	Ella	The Public Theater
2026	The Loved Ones	Nell	Irish Repertory Theatre

=== Filmography ===
Year	Production	Role	Notes
1989	The Littlest Victims	Barbara	TV Movie
1991	Star Trek: The Next Generation	Lt. Cmdr. Susanna Leijten	Episode: Identity Crisis
1991	Deceptions: A Mother's Secret	Donna McKenzie	
1992	Deceptions: A Mother's Secret	Eliza Becker	TV Movie
1997	Fools Rush In	Heliport Mother	
1998	Claire Dolan	Mary Egan	
2000	Center Stage	Mrs. Sawyer	
2005	The Squid and the Whale	Ms. Lemon	
2005	Brooklyn Lobster	Kathy Mulcahey (uncredited)	
2006	The Night Listener	Alice - Female Realtor	
2009	Peter and Vandy	Mom	
2010	The Company Men	Lorna	
2010	Blue Valentine	Glenda	
2010	The Good Wife	Pamela Pomeroy	Episode: Heart
2012	Fairhaven	Maddy	
2013	House of Cards	Evelyn Baxter	Season 1 only
2015	True Story	Maureen Duffy	
2015	The Family Fang	Camille Fang	
2016	Youth in Oregon	Maryann	
2019	A Beautiful Day in the Neighborhood	Joanne Rogers	
2019	Little Women	Mrs. Kirke	
2019	Manifest	Priscilla Landon	
2021	Dr. Death	Madeline Beyer	
2022	Showing Up	Jean	
TBA	You Haunt Me	Eileen	Short film

== Awards and nominations ==
Year	Award	Category	Work	Result
1987	Tony Awards	Best Performance by a Leading Actress in a Musical	Me and My Girl	Won
1987	Drama Desk Award	Outstanding Actress in a Musical	Me and My Girl	Nominated
1993	Outer Critics Circle Awards	Outstanding Actress in a Play	Saint Joan	Nominated
2012	Drama Desk Awards	Outstanding Ensemble	Sweet and Sad	Won
2012	Obie Awards	Ensemble Performance	Sweet and Sad	Won
2013	Drama Desk Awards	Outstanding Featured Actress in a Play	Sorry	Nominated
2014	New York Drama Critics' Circle Awards	Special Citation (Company of the Apple Family Plays)		Honored
2017	Lucille Lortel Awards	Outstanding Lead Actress in a Play	Women of a Certain Age	Nominated
2018	Lucille Lortel Awards	Outstanding Featured Actress in a Musical	The Lucky Ones	Nominated
2024	Obie Awards	Outstanding Performance	Deep Blue Sound	Won
2024	Tony Awards	Best Performance by a Leading Actress in a Musical	The Notebook	Nominated
2024	Dorian Awards	Outstanding Lead Performance in a Broadway Musical	The Notebook	Nominated
2024	Drama Desk Awards	Outstanding Featured Performance in a Musical	The Notebook	Nominated
2024	Drama League Awards	Distinguished Performance Award	The Notebook	Nominated
2024	Outer Critics Circle Awards	Outstanding Lead Performer in a Broadway Musical	The Notebook	Nominated
2024	New York Drama Critics' Circle Awards	Special Citation (Lifetime Achievement)		Honored
2025	Drama Desk Awards	Outstanding Featured Performance in a Play	Deep Blue Sound	Nominated
