= Anna Zavelson =

American actress and singer

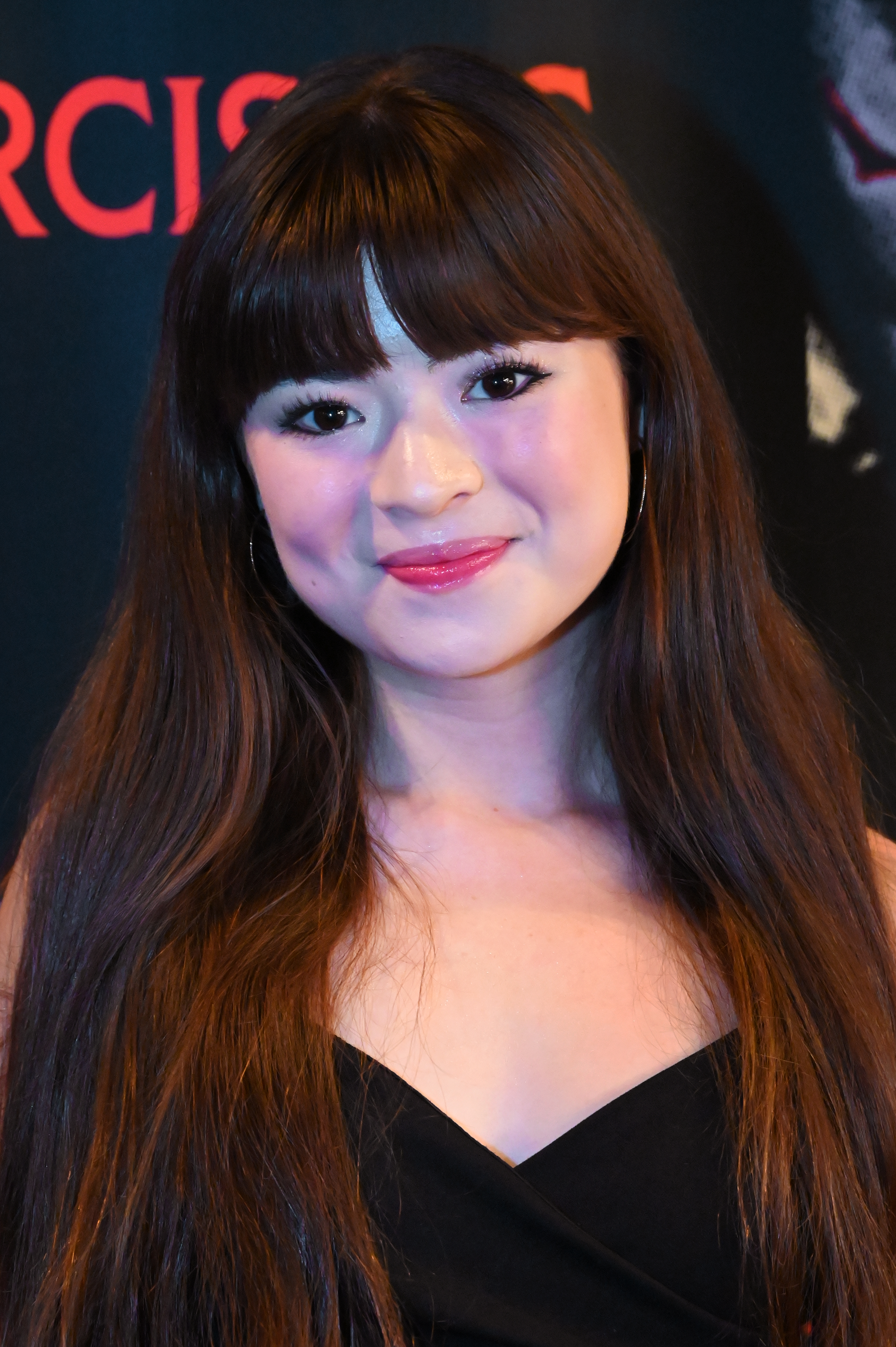
- Zavelson in 2025
- Born: 2003-2004
- Education: University of Michigan (BFA)
- Occupations: Actress and singer
- Years active: 2017–present

Anna Zavelson (born 2003–2004) is an American actress and singer. She is known for her roles on the Broadway stages.

== Early life ==
Zavelson is from Texas. She is Japanese-American and Jewish. She was inspired to pursue theatre after performing in Charlie and the Chocolate Factory in first grade.

== Career ==
Zavelson made her screen debut in the science-fiction television show Revolution. When she was in seventh grade, she played May Dempsey in 13 Reasons Why.

In 2023, she made her professional New York stage debut as Clara Johnson in Encores! production of The Light in the Piazza, alongside Ruthie Ann Miles. The following year, she went on to make her Broadway debut as a replacement Younger Allie in The Notebook.

Zavelson was one of the original actresses to play Christine Daaé in the immersive, Off-Broadway adaptation of The Phantom of the Opera, Masquerade. In February 2026, she departed the role to join Roundabout Theatre Company's world premiere of the play Chinese Republicans.

In May 2026, Zavelson was announced to play Christine Daaé in the West End production of The Phantom of the Opera at His Majesty’s Theatre in London. She is scheduled to appear in the role for a limited 11-week engagement from 18 May to 1 August 2026.

== Stage ==
Year	Title	Role	Venue
2023	The Light in the Piazza	Clara Johnson	New York City Center, Off-Broadway
2024	The Notebook	Younger Allie	Gerald Schoenfeld Theatre, Broadway
2025–2026	Masquerade	Christine Daaé	Lee's Art Shop, Off-Broadway
2026	Chinese Republicans	Katie	Laura Pels Theater, Off-Broadway
2026	The Phantom of the Opera	Christine Daaé	His Majesty’s Theatre

== Awards ==
Year	Award	Category	Work	Result
2022	Jimmy Award	Best Performance by an Actress	Anastasia	Finalist
2024	Clive Barnes Award		The Light in the Piazza	Won
