= Moulin Rouge! (musical) =

2018 musical based on the 2001 film

- The Musical
- 2018 Broadway teaser poster
- Music: Various
- Lyrics: Various
- Book: John Logan
- Basis: Moulin Rouge! by Baz Luhrmann; Craig Pearce
- Premiere: July 10, 2018: Colonial Theatre, Boston
- Productions: 2018 Boston; 2019 Broadway; 2022 West End; 2021 Australia; 2022 North American tour 2025 World tour
- Awards: Tony Award for Best Musical; Tony Award for Best Orchestrations

Moulin Rouge! The Musical is a jukebox musical with a book by John Logan. The musical is based on the 2001 film Moulin Rouge! directed by Baz Luhrmann and written by Luhrmann and Craig Pearce. Moulin Rouge! is set in Paris during the Belle Epoque; it follows Christian, a young composer, who falls in love with Satine, a courtesan and the star of the Moulin Rouge cabaret.

The musical premiered on July 10, 2018, at the Emerson Colonial Theatre in Boston. Moulin Rouge! played on Broadway at the Al Hirschfeld Theatre, from June 2019 to August 2026. The production was nominated for 14 Tony Awards, winning 10 (the most that year), including Best Musical. Moulin Rouge! has been produced for long runs around the world, including in the West End, beginning in 2021.

== Background ==
By 2016, a stage musical was being developed by Global Creatures to be directed by Alex Timbers.

A workshop took place in 2017, starring Aaron Tveit and Karen Olivo. The lab ran from October 30 until December 15.

== Plot ==
=== Act I ===
In the Montmartre Quarter of Paris, France, at the turn of the 20th century, the Moulin Rouge cabaret club, "where all your dreams come true", is in full swing under the direction of Harold Zidler. Christian arrives with fellow bohemians Henri de Toulouse-Lautrec and Santiago the Argentinean. The money-motivated Duke of Monroth is introduced ("Welcome to the Moulin Rouge"). Christian interrupts Zidler to start a story "about love", concerning a woman named Satine.

The story begins in 1899, as Christian arrives in the Montmartre district of Paris from Lima, Ohio, where he meets Toulouse-Lautrec and Santiago, who are attempting to create a play with songs in it. The two are impressed by Christian's musical and songwriting talents and ask for help to get their work produced at the Moulin Rouge. The trio celebrates bohemian ideals ("Truth, Beauty, Freedom, Love"). At the Moulin Rouge, Zidler introduces Satine, the star of the club and a courtesan ("The Sparkling Diamond"). After Satine performs, Zidler prepares for her to meet and impress the Duke of Monroth, who might invest in the Moulin Rouge and save it from financial ruin. However, Satine mistakes Christian for the Duke and invites him to her dressing room in "the Elephant" outside the club ("Shut Up and Raise Your Glass").

Dancers at the club share their worries with Satine backstage about the Moulin's financial future. Satine, who is concealing her worsening consumption from her colleagues, resolves to stay strong for them ("Firework"). Christian arrives in the Elephant hoping to impress Satine with his musical talent, whereas Satine is prepared to seduce him, under the impression that he is the Duke. Christian's true identity is revealed ("Your Song"). The Duke interrupts them; Christian and Satine claim they were practicing lines for a new show, Bohemian Rhapsody. With Zidler's help, Christian, Satine, Toulouse, and Santiago pitch the show to the Duke with an improvised plot about an evil gangster attempting to woo an ingenue who loves a poor sailor ("So Exciting! (The Pitch Song)"). The Duke decides to back the show, and Zidler reminds Satine that her duty is to keep the Duke happy for the sake of the Moulin Rouge. She rejects Christian, the Duke returns, and he and Satine spend the evening together ("Sympathy for the Duke").

In Montmartre, Toulouse shares with Christian that he fell in love with Satine many years ago, when she was living on the streets. Though impressed by her spirit, he was too shy to confess his love for her over the years. He urges Christian to fight for Satine, insisting to him, "The greatest thing you'll ever learn is just to love and be loved in return" ("Nature Boy"). Christian returns to Satine to persuade her that they should be together. Reluctantly, she eventually returns his affections ("Elephant Love Medley").

=== Act II ===
Two months later, rehearsals are underway for Bohemian Rhapsody. Christian and Satine continue seeing each other secretly, and Santiago falls in love with dancer Nini ("Backstage Romance"). Tensions rise between Toulouse and the controlling Duke. Nini tells Satine that she needs to be careful about her relationship with Christian and keep the Duke happy, as he once threw a vial of acid in the face of another woman who betrayed him. Satine tells Christian that their relationship endangers the show and the Moulin Rouge, but he counters by writing a secret love song to affirm their love ("Come What May").

In the Champs-Élysées neighborhood, the Duke tells Satine that he wants every part of her, including her heart. When Satine's protests that she does not "fit in" with his upper-class Parisian society, he remodels her image against her wishes ("Only Girl in a Material World"). The Duke continues to involve himself in Bohemian Rhapsody's creative aspects, to Toulouse's frustration. It becomes clear that the show is a metaphor for Christian, Satine, and the Duke who, enraged on realizing this, threatens to reconsider his investment entirely. Zidler reminds Satine that she alone can appease the Duke. Satine's illness worsens, but she urges her colleagues not to share that she is ill; she wants to fight to keep the Moulin Rouge and the play alive.

Toulouse and Santiago urge Christian to forget Satine and move on. Christian gets drunk on absinthe, imagining Satine as The Green Fairy ("Chandelier"). He expresses jealousy and disgust that Satine is with the Duke instead of him, ignoring Zidler's warning that loving a prostitute "always ends badly" ("El Tango de Roxanne"). At his castle, the Duke tells Satine that he will have Christian killed if she chooses him. Christian tries to persuade Satine to leave with him, singing their secret song. Knowing that Christian would be killed if she says otherwise, Satine tells Christian that she does not love him. Christian leaves.

Christian, in despair, loads a prop gun with real bullets, planning to commit suicide on stage during the show's opening night. Meanwhile, Satine's illness dramatically worsens. Together, she and Toulouse stand up to the Duke, who leaves the Moulin Rouge before the performance begins ("Crazy Rolling"). As Satine performs, Christian enters and asks her to face him as he turns the gun towards himself. Satine sings their secret song, which saves his life by revealing to him that she loved him the entire time. After a final song together in which the two affirm their love one last time, Satine tells Christian to "tell our story" and dies in his arms ("Your Song" (reprise)). Christian declares that his and Satine's story will forever be told ("Finale (Come What May)").

=== Differences from the film ===
Changes were made in adapting the 2001 film for the stage. The show-within-a-show is no longer the Bollywood-inspired Spectacular Spectacular but the more subdued Bohemian Rhapsody. Christian, now American rather than English, is the leading actor in the show along with composing it. Satine is portrayed as older and mentors her coworkers. She dedicates herself to the club's survival and finds the (now charismatic) Duke's offers of financial security more compelling. She and the Duke are immediately involved in a sexual relationship, whereas in the film she seeks to evade it. Satine is also aware of her fatal diagnosis. The absinthe scene is moved much later in the musical, and Christian's inebriated state influences his decisions in the final scenes, where he threatens suicide instead of disparaging Satine. The Duke leaves the Moulin Rouge when Satine rebukes him before the final performance, and he no longer tries to kill Christian after the lovers reunite. Zidler is portrayed as gay.

== Productions ==
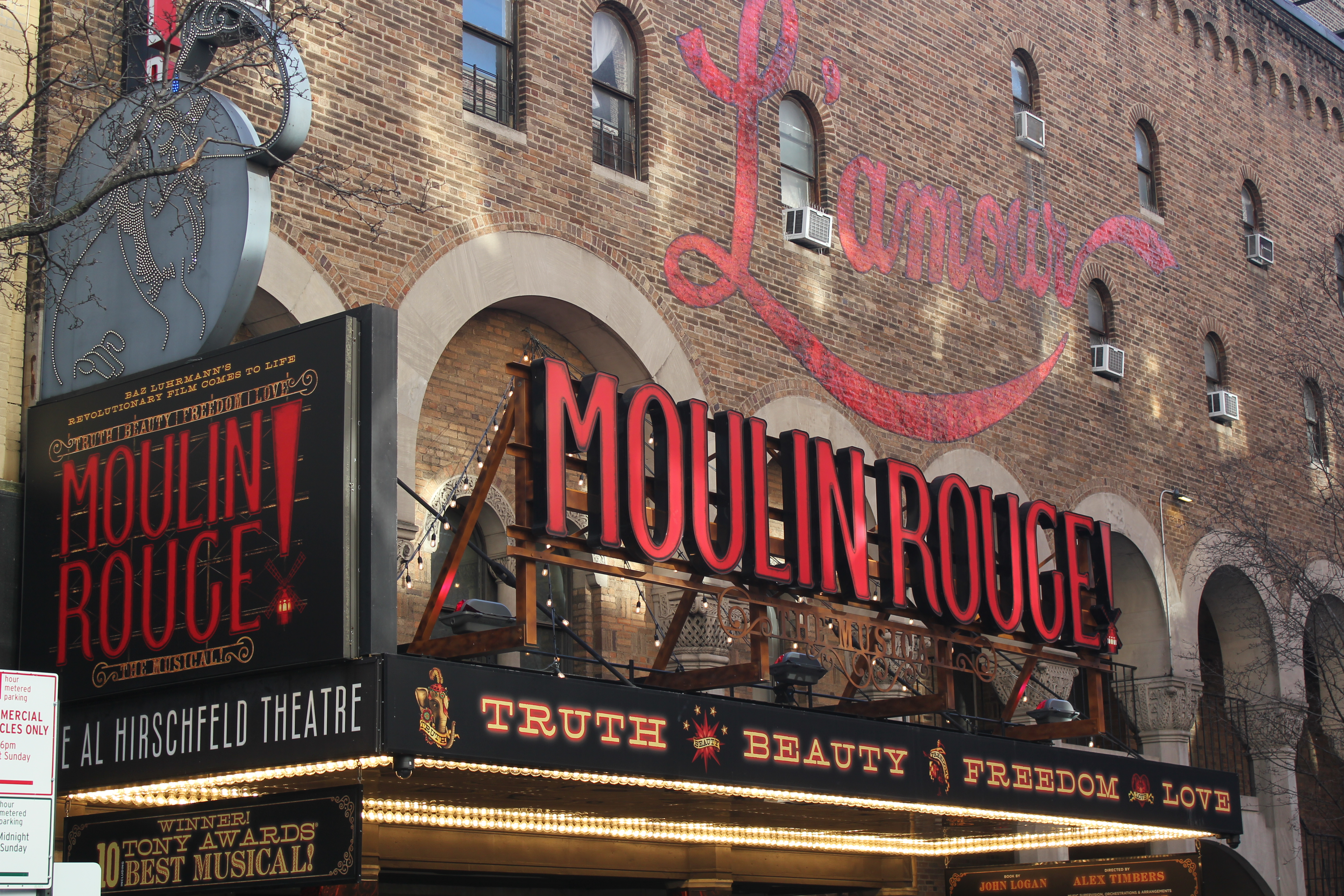
Branding as seen on the Al Hirschfeld Theatre

=== Boston (2018) ===
Moulin Rouge! was scheduled to begin preview performances on June 27, 2018, at the Emerson Colonial Theatre in Boston. Construction delays in renovating the Emerson Colonial Theatre resulted in the premiere date being pushed back to July 10. The production featured direction by Timbers, choreography by Sonya Tayeh, sets by Derek McLane, costumes by Catherine Zuber, lighting by Justin Townsend, and sound by Peter Hylenski. The cast again starred Tveit and Olivo as Christian and Satine, with Danny Burstein as Harold, Tam Mutu as the Duke, Sahr Ngaujah as Toulouse-Lautrec, and Robyn Hurder as Nini. The production closed on August 19, 2018.

=== Broadway (2019–2026) ===
The musical next opened on Broadway at the Al Hirschfeld Theatre, with the same cast and crew as in Boston. Previews began on June 28, 2019, with an official opening on July 25. The production was suspended on March 12, 2020, due to the COVID-19 pandemic, and at least four cast members soon contracted the virus. Broadway closures continued until mid-2021.

To protest the industry's silence on the allegations against producer Scott Rudin (never a producer of the show), Olivo decided not to return. Natalie Mendoza, who appeared in the original film as a can-can dancer, took over the role of Satine when the production resumed on September 24, 2021. Replacements as Zidler have included Eric Anderson, Tituss Burgess, Robert Petkoff, Wayne Brady, Bob the Drag Queen, and Megan Thee Stallion. Replacements as Satine have included JoJo, Solea Pfeiffer and Meg Donnelly. Derek Klena, Casey Cott, Jordan Fisher and John Cardoza have been replacements as Christian; Declan Bennett, Andy Karl and Taye Diggs have been replacements as the Duke.

The show closed on August 30, 2026, after 24 previews and 2,297 regular performances.

=== Australia (2021–2024; 2027–present) ===
The first Australian production opened in Melbourne's Regent Theatre in 2021. The show moved to Sydney in May 2022 and returned to Melbourne in August 2023. It starred Des Flanagan and Alinta Chidzey and featured Simon Burke as Harold and Timomatic as Toulouse. It closed on February 4, 2024.

Another Australian production is set to open in Sydney in March 2027, before moving to Adelaide in October 2027.

=== West End (2022–present) ===
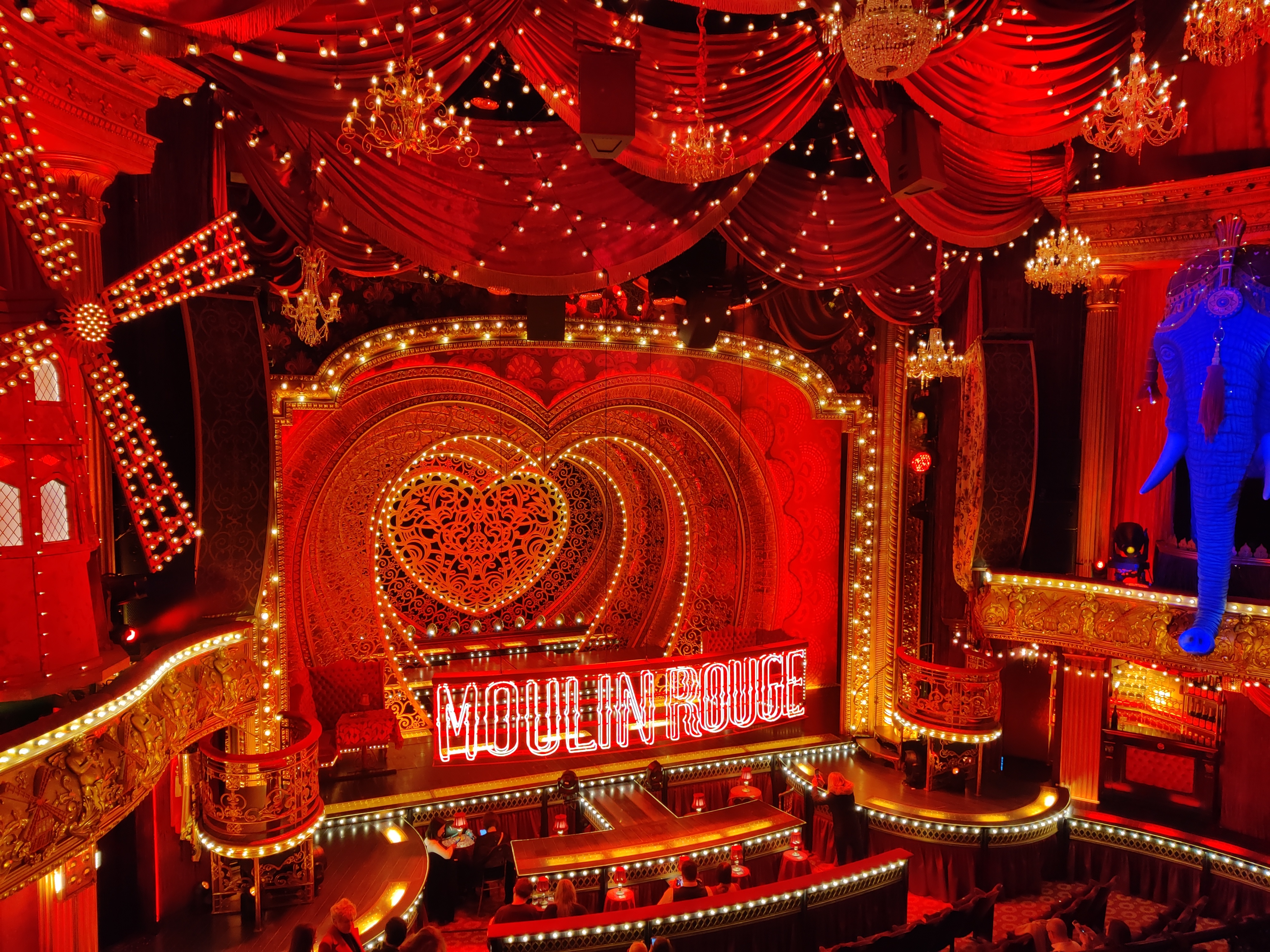
Image of the stage at the Piccadilly Theatre, London in March 2023

The musical officially debuted in the West End, with the same creative team, on January 20, 2022, previews began on November 13, 2021. The production, at the Piccadilly Theatre, had been delayed from March 2021 due to the COVID-19 pandemic in the United Kingdom. The show was nominated for 5 Laurence Olivier Awards in 2022, including Best New Musical. The cast starred Jamie Bogyo and Liisi LaFontaine and featured Clive Carter as Harold, Jason Pennycooke as Tolouse and Zoe Birkett as Arabia. Jamie Muscato, Natalie Kassanga, Alistair Brammer and Dex Lee have been replacements in the cast.

=== North American tour (2022–2026) ===
After covid delays, the first North American tour began at Chicago's Nederlander Theater on March 19, 2022. The cast starred Conor Ryan and Courtney Reed and featured David Harris as the Duke. Replacements in the cast have included John Cardoza, Kevyn Morrow, Robert Petkoff, and Jay Armstrong Johnson. The tour played its final performance at Boston Opera House on 2 August, 2026.

=== Netherlands (2024–2026) ===
A Dutch production by Stage Entertainment began on September 19, 2024, at the Beatrix Theatre in Utrecht in the Netherlands. The cast included Carlo Boszhard as Harold Zidler. The production was nominated for nine awards and won five at the Dutch Musical Awards Gala. It closed on July 16, 2026.

=== World tour (2025–present) ===
The show began a world tour in the UK on April 22, 2025 at the Edinburgh Playhouse. The original cast featured Verity Thompson and Nate Landskroner as Satine and Christian, Cameron Blakely as Harold, Kurt Kansley as Toulouse-Lautrec, German Santiago as Santiago, James Bryers as The Duke, Kahlia Davis as Nini, Summer Priest as Arabia, Ellie Jane Grant as La Chocolat, Scott Sutcliffe as Baby Doll and Patrice Tipoki as the alternate Satine. The production has the same creative team as the original production. Beyond the UK, stops include Dublin and Zurich. The tour is directed by Timbers and choreographed by Tayeh; designers again include McLane (sets), Zuber (costumes), Townsend (lighting) and Hylenski (sound).

=== Others ===
On November 6, 2022, the first non-English production opened at the Musical Dome in Cologne, Germany, with the dialogue and majority of the songs translated into German by Ruth and Johannes Deny. As of 2025, more than 1.1 million people have attended the production. A South Korean production opened in Seoul in December 2022 and ran through March 2023. Hong Kwang-Ho and Lee Choong-joo alternated in the role of Christian, and Ivy and Kim Ji-Woo split the role of Satine. A Japanese production ran at the Imperial Theatre in Tokyo from June 24 to August 31, 2023. The double cast starred Yoshio Inoue and Shouma Kai as Christian, and Nozomi Futo and Ayaka Hirahara as Satine; it featured Satoshi Hashimoto and Yuki Matsumura as Harold, Kanata Irei as the Duke, Masataka Nakagauchi as Santiago and Kaede Kaga as Nini.

A Norwegian production opened on Chateau Neuf in Oslo on August 30, 2023. It starred Sondre Lerche and Heidi Ruud Ellingsen and featured Anders Baasmo Christiansen as Harold. A Danish production opened at Falkonersalen, Frederiksberg September 7, 2023 before going on tour to Vejle and Holstebro. It starred Silas Holst and Sara Viktoria Bjerregaard, and featured Rasmus Bjerg as Harold and Andy Roda as Baby Doll. The production was set to be revived at the Copenhagen Opera House July 2025. A Swedish production played at Chinateatern in Stockholm, premiering on September 14, 2023. It starred Andreas Wijk and Marsha Songcome, and featured Anton Ewald as Santiago. A Finnish production opened at Helsinki City Theatre in Helsinki on August 29, 2024.

== Cast and characters ==
Character	Description	Original Broadway Cast	Other notable performers in long-running, noteworthy productions (Note: The "Productions" section above displays citations to sources verifying all performers mentioned in the table.)
Christian	Idealistic young poet who has recently moved to Paris	Aaron Tveit	Derek Klena, Jamie Muscato, Casey Cott, Jordan Fisher, John Cardoza, Jay Armstrong Johnson, Alistair Brammer
Satine	Star of the nightclub	Karen Olivo	Natalie Mendoza, Courtney Reed, JoJo, Solea Pfeiffer, Natalie Kassanga, Meg Donnelly
Harold Zidler	Owner and emcee of the nightclub	Danny Burstein	Eric Anderson, Tituss Burgess, Simon Burke, Clive Carter, Boy George, Robert Petkoff, Cameron Blakely, Wayne Brady, Bob the Drag Queen, Carlo Boszhard, Megan Thee Stallion
The Duke of Monroth	Rich aristocrat who plans to buy the nightclub	Tam Mutu	Declan Bennett, David Harris, Taye Diggs, Andy Karl
Toulouse-Lautrec	Bohemian playwright	Sahr Ngaujah	Timomatic, Jason Pennycooke, Dex Lee, Kevyn Morrow
Santiago	Bohemian choreographer	Ricky Rojas	Anton Ewald
Nini	Club dancer	Robyn Hurder	Jessica Lee Goldyn
La Chocolat	Club dancer	Jacqueline B. Arnold	
Arabia	Club dancer	Holly James	Zoe Birkett
Baby Doll	Club dancer	Jeigh Madjus	Andy Roda

== Musical numbers ==
As in the film, the musical's score weaves together original songs with popular music; it adds songs that were written in the 17 years following the film's premiere.

Act I

Number	Song(s) included	Character(s)
"Welcome to the Moulin Rouge!"	"Lady Marmalade"†; "Because We Can"; "Minnie the Moocher"; "Galop Infernal"; "Amores Como El Nuestro"; "Mr. Big Stuff"; "So Fresh, So Clean"; "Money (That's What I Want)"; "Ride wit Me"; "Burning Down the House"; "Walk This Way"; "Where It's At"; "Let's Dance"; "You Spin Me Round (Like a Record)"	Zidler, Nini, La Chocolat, Arabia, Baby Doll, Monroth, Christian, Toulouse-Lautrec, Santiago and Company
"Bohemian Ideas"‡	"The Sound of Music"†; "I Don't Want to Wait"; "Every Breath You Take"; "Never Gonna Give You Up"	Christian
"Truth, Beauty, Freedom, Love"	"Royals"; "Children of the Revolution"†; "We Are Young"	Christian, Toulouse-Lautrec, Santiago and Company
"The Sparkling Diamond"	"Diamonds Are Forever"; "Diamonds Are a Girl's Best Friend"†; "Material Girl"†; "Single Ladies (Put a Ring on It)"; "Brick House"; "My Lovin' (You're Never Gonna Get It)"; "Jungle Boogie"; "Diamonds"	Satine, Nini, La Chocolat, Arabia and Baby Doll
"Shut Up and Raise Your Glass"	"Shut Up and Dance"; "Raise Your Glass"; "I Wanna Dance with Somebody (Who Loves Me)"	Satine, Christian, Toulouse-Lautrec, Santiago, Zidler and Company
"Firework"	"Firework"	Satine
"Your Song"	"Your Song"†	Christian and Satine
"So Exciting! (The Pitch Song)"†	"Complainte de la Butte"; "Milord"; "La Vie en rose"; "Habanera (L'amour est un oiseau rebelle)"; "Galop Infernal"†	Zidler, Toulouse-Lautrec, Christian, Santiago, and Satine
"Sympathy for the Duke"	"Sympathy for the Devil"; "You Can't Always Get What You Want"; "Gimme Shelter"	Monroth, Satine and Company
"Nature Boy"	"Nature Boy"†	Toulouse-Lautrec and Christian
"Elephant Love Medley"†	"One More Night"†; "Pride (In the Name of Love)"†; "Play the Game"; "Love Hurts"; "Take On Me"; "It Ain't Me Babe"; "I Love You Always Forever"; "Love is a Battlefield"; "Don't Speak"; "Everlasting Love"; "What's Love Got to Do with It"; "Fidelity"; "Can't Help Falling in Love"; "Torn"; "Such Great Heights"; "Up Where We Belong"†; "Heroes"†; "Your Song"†; "I Will Always Love You"†	Christian, Satine and Company

Act II

Number	Song(s) included	Character(s)
"Backstage Romance"	"Bad Romance"; "Tainted Love"; "Seven Nation Army"; "Toxic"; "Sweet Dreams (Are Made of This)"	Santiago, Nini and Company
"Come What May"	"Come What May"	Christian and Satine
"Only Girl in a Material World"	"Only Girl (In the World)"; "Diamonds Are a Girl's Best Friend"†; "Material Girl"†	Monroth, Satine and Company
"Chandelier"	"Chandelier"	Zidler, Christian, Santiago, Toulouse-Lautrec and Company
"El Tango de Roxanne"	"Roxanne"†; "Tanguera"; "Chandelier"	Christian and Company
"Crazy Rolling"	"Crazy"; "Rolling in the Deep"	Christian, Satine and Company
"Your Song" (reprise)	"Come What May"†; "Your Song"†; "Heroes"†	Satine, Christian and Company
"Finale (Come What May)"	"Come What May"†; "Lady Marmalade"†	Christian and Company
"More More More!"	"Lady Marmalade"†; "Hey Ya!"; "Because We Can"†; "Minnie the Moocher"; "Bad Romance"; "What's Love Got to Do with It"; "Don't You Want Me"‡; "Crazy"; "Galop Infernal"†	Zidler and Company

† Featured in the 2001 film

‡ Not included on the original cast recording

=== Cast recording ===
The original Broadway cast recording was released digitally on August 30, 2019. A CD version was released on October 25, 2019, and a vinyl version was released on December 13, 2019.

==== Charts ====
Chart (2019)	Peak position
US Billboard 200	115

== Reception ==
=== Critical response ===
The Broadway production received mixed to positive reviews.

In a rave review, theater critic John Simon wrote, "If you like splash, Moulin Rouge! is the show for you. Even more than the Baz Luhrmann movie, on which the musical is loosely based, it can hold your wonderment without abate from start to finish.... This is a show to make the young feel mature, and the old blissfully young again." It was named a Critic's Pick by The New York Times with Ben Brantley calling it "a cloud-surfing, natural high of a production."

Diane Snyder of The Telegraph praised the scenic design, choreography, and costume and wrote that "Moulin Rouge! may not have the depth of some of Broadway's great musicals... [but] it's fun, tuneful and entertaining, and that's exactly what we need right now." Mashable's Erin Strecker said that "This is the best of what a jukebox musical can be; a thrilling burst of color and chorus and nostalgia and bold reimagining." Adam Feldman leaned positive as he called the show "an extravagant Broadway megamix," commenting that it "looks and feels expensive." Some critics praised the changes made from the film. Patrick Ryan of USA Today commented that "the use of recent pop songs actually improves upon the source material, helping flesh out characters' motivations and deepen the central romance." David Cote of The New York Observer wrote, "Logan's tweaks to the original screenplay are neat and necessary."

In a mixed review, Rolling Stone's Brittany Spanos criticized the musical's disjointedness but praised the high-energy parts of the show. In another mixed review, Charles Isherwood of Broadway News summed up that "The resulting show is all flash, splash and megawatt musical numbers, nimbly if not entirely masking a fairly hollow and certainly hoary emotional core." Alexis Soloski of The Guardian also commented on the leads' lack of chemistry, but mentioned that the show delivers when it comes to "dazzle and excitement," praising its choreography, set, energy, and costume.

=== Box office ===
According to Playbill, Moulin Rouge! grossed around $2.2 million for the week ending of October 13, 2019. As of September 11, 2022, the musical grossed around $135.5 million with 371,285 attendance and 260 performances.

== Awards and nominations ==
=== 2018 Boston production ===
Year	Award	Category	Nominee	Result
2019	IRNE Awards	Best New Musical		Won
2019	IRNE Awards	Best Musical		Won
2019	IRNE Awards	Best Actor – Musical	Aaron Tveit	Nominated
2019	IRNE Awards	Best Actress – Musical	Karen Olivo	Nominated
2019	IRNE Awards	Best Supporting Actor – Musical	Danny Burstein	Won
2019	IRNE Awards	Best Set Design	Derek McLane	Won
2019	IRNE Awards	Best Costume Design	Catherine Zuber	Won
2019	IRNE Awards	Best Lighting Design	Justin Townsend	Nominated
2019	IRNE Awards	Best Sound Design	Peter Hylenski	Won
2019	IRNE Awards	Best Director – Musical	Alex Timbers	Nominated
2019	IRNE Awards	Best Choreography	Sonya Tayeh	Nominated
2019	IRNE Awards	Best Music Director	Cian McCarthy	Won

=== Original Broadway production ===
Year	Award	Category	Nominee	Result
2020	Tony Award	Best Musical		Won
2020	Tony Award	Best Book of a Musical	John Logan	Nominated
2020	Tony Award	Best Actor in a Musical	Aaron Tveit	Won
2020	Tony Award	Best Actress in a Musical	Karen Olivo	Nominated
2020	Tony Award	Best Performance by a Featured Actor in a Musical	Danny Burstein	Won
2020	Tony Award	Best Performance by a Featured Actor in a Musical	Sahr Ngaujah	Nominated
2020	Tony Award	Best Performance by a Featured Actress in a Musical	Robyn Hurder	Nominated
2020	Tony Award	Best Direction of a Musical	Alex Timbers	Won
2020	Tony Award	Best Choreography	Sonya Tayeh	Won
2020	Tony Award	Best Orchestrations	Justin Levine, Matt Stine, Katie Kresek and Charlie Rosen	Won
2020	Tony Award	Best Scenic Design of a Musical	Derek McLane	Won
2020	Tony Award	Best Costume Design of a Musical	Catherine Zuber	Won
2020	Tony Award	Best Lighting Design of a Musical	Justin Townsend	Won
2020	Tony Award	Best Sound Design of a Musical	Peter Hylenski	Won
2020	Drama Desk Award	Outstanding Choreography	Sonya Tayeh	Won
2020	Drama Desk Award	Outstanding Scenic Design of a Musical	Derek McLane	Won
2020	Drama Desk Award	Outstanding Costume Design of a Musical	Catherine Zuber	Won
2020	Drama Desk Award	Outstanding Lighting Design of a Musical	Justin Townsend	Won
2020	Drama Desk Award	Outstanding Sound Design of a Musical	Peter Hylenski	Won
2020	Drama League Award	Outstanding Production of a Broadway or Off-Broadway Musical		Won
2020	Drama League Award	Distinguished Performance	Danny Burstein	Won
2020	Drama League Award	Distinguished Performance	Karen Olivo	Nominated
2020	Outer Critics Circle Award	Outstanding New Broadway Musical		Honoree
2020	Outer Critics Circle Award	Outstanding Actor in a Musical	Aaron Tveit	Honoree
2020	Outer Critics Circle Award	Outstanding Actress in a Musical	Karen Olivo	Honoree
2020	Outer Critics Circle Award	Outstanding Featured Actor in a Musical	Danny Burstein	Honoree
2020	Outer Critics Circle Award	Outstanding Scenic Design of a Play or Musical	Derek McLane	Honoree
2020	Outer Critics Circle Award	Outstanding Costume Design of a Play or Musical	Catherine Zuber	Honoree
2020	Outer Critics Circle Award	Outstanding Lighting Design of a Play or Musical	Justin Townsend	Honoree
2020	Outer Critics Circle Award	Outstanding Sound Design of a Play or Musical	Peter Hylenski	Honoree
2020	Outer Critics Circle Award	Outstanding Director of a Musical	Alex Timbers	Honoree
2020	Outer Critics Circle Award	Outstanding Choreographer	Sonya Tayeh	Honoree
2020	Outer Critics Circle Award	Outstanding Orchestrations	Justin Levine, with Matt Stine, Katie Kresek and Charlie Rosen	Honoree
2020	Grammy Award		Best Musical Theater Album	Nominated
2022	Chita Rivera Awards	Outstanding Choreography in a Broadway Show	Sonya Tayeh	Nominated
2022	Chita Rivera Awards	Outstanding Ensemble in a Broadway Show		Nominated
2022	Chita Rivera Awards	Outstanding Female Dancer in a Broadway Show	Robyn Hurder	Nominated

=== Original West End production ===
Year	Award	Category	Nominee	Result
2022	Laurence Olivier Award	Best New Musical		Nominated
2022	Laurence Olivier Award	Best Actor in a Supporting Role in a Musical	Clive Carter	Nominated
2022	Laurence Olivier Award	Best Theatre Choreographer	Sonya Tayeh	Nominated
2022	Laurence Olivier Award	Best Set Design	Derek McLane	Nominated
2022	Laurence Olivier Award	Best Costume Design	Catherine Zuber	Won
