= Robert Wells (songwriter) =

American songwriter (1922–1998)

- Born: Robert Levinson; October 15, 1922; Raymond, Washington, U.S.
- Died: September 23, 1998 (aged 75); Santa Monica, California, U.S.
- Occupations: Songwriter; composer; screenwriter; producer
- Years active: 1945–1998
- Known for: Co-wrote The Christmas Song with Mel Tormé; Co-wrote the theme song to The Patty Duke Show with Sid Ramin
- Spouse(s): Lisa Kirk (m. 1949; died 1990) Marilyn Jackson

Robert Wells (born Robert Levinson, October 15, 1922 – September 23, 1998) was an American songwriter, composer, screenwriter and television producer. During his early career, he collaborated with Mel Tormé, writing several hit songs, most notably "The Christmas Song" in 1945. Later, he became a prolific writer and producer for television, for such shows as The Dinah Shore Chevy Show, as well as for numerous variety specials, such as If They Could See Me Now, starring Shirley MacLaine. He was nominated for several Academy Awards and won six Emmys and a Peabody Award.

== Early life and career ==
Robert Wells was born to a Jewish family in 1922 in Raymond, Washington, the son of Edna Irene (Bradford) and Nathan Levinson. He attended a local business college and later the University of Southern California, where he majored in speech and drama. He served in the United States Army Air Forces during World War II. Both before and after the war, he worked as a scriptwriter and lyricist for both radio and film.

== Work with Mel Tormé ==
From 1945–1949, Wells collaborated extensively with Mel Tormé. Among their many hits were "Born to be Blue" and "A Stranger Called the Blues", as well as numerous film songs.

Their most famous work together is "The Christmas Song". Wells had written what would become the first four lines of the song on a hot day in July, 1945. Tormé had come over to visit, and saw the lines written out on a notepad. Wells thought the idea of writing a Christmas song was a good means of cooling off in the hot California summer, and Tormé agreed. The song was completed in 40 minutes, and went on to become one of the most performed Christmas songs of all time.

== Other work ==
Tormé and Wells parted ways in 1949, and Wells went on to write extensively for film and television, as well as to continue to collaborate on popular songs with numerous other musicians and writers. Among his collaborators were Duke Ellington, Cy Coleman (with whom he was nominated for an Emmy), and Henry Mancini (with whom he was nominated for an Oscar). He was also the lyricist for the 1955 Broadway musical revue 3 for Tonight which he created in collaboration with composer Walter Schumann. Gower Champion directed and starred in the production which won the Outer Critics Circle Award for Best Musical in 1955.

Robert Wells was a frequent collaborator with filmmaker Blake Edwards, composing songs for such films as A Shot in the Dark and 10, as well as a 1975 British Television special for Edward's wife, Julie Andrews, Julie – My Favourite Things. Other films to feature his work include the 1953 film From Here to Eternity, 1954's The French Line, the 1956 western Tension at Table Rock.

On television, he served as a writer, songwriter and producer for The Dinah Shore Chevy Show, as well as a songwriter for numerous one-off variety specials, starring such acts as Gene Kelly, Peggy Fleming, Andy Williams, Victor Borge, Jane Powell, and Harry Belafonte. In 1963, he collaborated with fellow composer and songwriter Sid Ramin to write the theme to The Patty Duke Show. He also won two Emmy awards for his work on the 1974 special Shirley MacLaine: If They Could See Me Now, as well as four consecutive Emmy awards for his work on The Dinah Shore Chevy Show.

== Personal life ==
In 1949, Wells married Broadway stage actress and singer Lisa Kirk (of Allegro and Kiss Me, Kate fame). They remained married until her death in 1990. His second wife was Marilyn Jackson.

== Notable songs ==
Robert Wells has written or co-written over 400 published songs. Among the more notable ones:

- "The Christmas Song (Chestnuts Roasting on an Open Fire)" with Mel Tormé (1945)
- "Re-Enlistment Blues" and "From Here to Eternity", both with Fred Karger, from the film From Here to Eternity (1953)
- "What Every Girl Should Know" with David Holt (1954)
- "Here's to the Losers" with Jack Segal (1963)
- "When Joanna Loved Me" with Jack Segal (1963)
- "It's Easy to Say" with Henry Mancini from the film 10 (1979)

== Awards ==
Among the awards won by Robert Wells:

- Six Emmys
- 1957 Sylvania Award
- 1957 Peabody Award
- 1998 Towering Song award from the Songwriters Hall of Fame for "The Christmas Song" (with Mel Tormé)
