= 3 for Tonight =

1955 musical revue by Walter Schumann and Robert Wells

- 1955 Playbill for Broadway production
- Music: Walter Schumann
- Lyrics: Robert Wells
- Premiere: Plymouth Theatre

3 for Tonight is a musical revue in two acts with music by composer Walter Schumann and lyrics by Robert Wells. It premiered at the Plymouth Theatre on Broadway in 1955, where it played for 85 performances.

== Synopsis ==
3 for Tonight had music composed by Walter Schumann and lyrics by Robert Wells. In addition to the original material by Schumann and Wells, the revue also included the song "In That Great Gettin' Up Mornin" by Jester Hairston and two songs by Jack Norworth, "By the Light of the Silvery Moon" and "Shine on, Harvest Moon".

3 for Tonight was described as "not really a concert, not really a revue," instead a night of music celebrating the talents of the performers. It did not have a unifying theme or narrative, nor a specific style or era of music. A Time Magazine review of the show described it as "sceneryless and recital-like."

== Production history ==
Paul Gregory first pitched the idea of 3 for Tonight to Gower and Marge Champion with the idea of a "lighter sort of entertainment" with sparse scenery, props, and costuming, instead focusing on music, dance, and whimsy. Prior to its Broadway debut, the show had performed a four-month national tour, playing in fifty-seven cities.

The musical opened on Broadway on April 6, 1955, at the Plymouth Theatre where it closed after 85 performances on June 18, 1955. On June 22, 1955, the cast performed the musical live on television for national broadcast on CBS. Produced by Paul Gregory, the production was staged by Gower Champion who also starred in the musical with his wife Marge Champion, Harry Belafonte, Betty Benson, and Hiram Sherman. The ensemble of the cast came from The Voices of Walter Schumann, a vocal ensemble conducted by composer Walter Schumann, who also acted as music director. Costumes were designed by Jack's of Hollywood, and the production was designed and constructed by R. L. Grosh & Sons. The show won the Outer Critics Circle Award for Best Musical in 1955.
