= Deep Blue Sound =

2023 play by Abe Koogler

- Written by: Abe Koogler
- Original language: English
- Genre: Drama
- Setting: Vashon Island, Washington; Present Day

Premiere
- Date premiered: June 5, 2023
- Place premiered: Clubbed Thumb

Deep Blue Sound is a dramatic stage play written by American playwright Abe Koogler.

The play tells the story of various occupants of a small town off the coast of Puget Sound trying to decipher why the local whales have disappeared. One of the townspeople, Ella, is dying of cancer and wishes to utilize the Death with Dignity Act.

== Production history ==
=== Off-Broadway (2023) ===
The play premiered Off-Broadway, produced by Clubbed Thumb as a part of their summer season. The production was directed by Arin Arbus with set design by dots and lighting by Isabella Byrd. For her performance, Maryann Plunkett was the recipient of an Obie Award for Distinguished Performance. The title comes from a specific group of Eastern North Pacific Gray whales known locally as “the Sounders”, who historically migrate through Puget Sound in early March and stay until May. Whale spotting is a popular pastime in the area.

=== Off-Broadway (2025) ===
The play was announced to have another staging this time at The Public Theaters Shiva Theatre, with Maryann Plunkett reprising her role as Ella and Arin Arbus returning as director. The production opened for previews on February 25 and was scheduled to run until March 29, however due to high ticket sales and positive reviews, the final performance was moved to April 5, 2025. The production received a nomination for Drama Desk Award for Outstanding Play, along with Plunkett receiving a nomination for Outstanding Featured Performance in a Play.

== Original cast and characters ==
| Character | Off-Broadway (2023) | Off-Broadway (2025) |
|---|---|---|
| Ella | Maryann Plunkett | Maryann Plunkett |
| Annie | Crystal Finn | Crystal Finn |
| Les | Jan Leslie Harding | Jan Leslie Harding |
| Mary | Tala Ashe | Miriam Silverman |
| John | Thomas Jay Ryan | Arnie Burton |
| Joy | Natsuko Ohama | Mia Katigbak |
| Gary | Bruce McKenzie | Ryan King |
| Ali | Brittany K. Allen | Carmen Zilles |
| Chris | Armando Riesco | Armando Riesco |
