= The Notebook (musical) =

Musical based on the novel of the same name

- Broadway Promotional Poster
- Music: Ingrid Michaelson
- Lyrics: Ingrid Michaelson
- Book: Bekah Brunstetter
- Basis: The Notebook by Nicholas Sparks
- Productions: 2022 Chicago; 2024 Broadway; 2025 US Tour

The Notebook is a musical with music and lyrics by Ingrid Michaelson and a book by Bekah Brunstetter. It is based on the 1996 novel of the same name, written by Nicholas Sparks. The musical opened on Broadway on March 14, 2024 at the Gerald Schoenfeld Theatre and closed on December 15, 2024. A U.S. tour and a Philippine production have followed.

== Summary ==
Act 1

Noah Calhoun lives with his wife, Allie, in a retirement home. Allie is suffering from Alzheimer’s and struggles to remember her husband and life ("Time"). Noah reads a love story to Allie from a notebook – the story of the two of them, around when they were seventeen and during a period about ten years later.

Allie, who comes from a wealthy family, and Noah, a working-class boy, first meet when Allie arrives in his town for summer break from high school. They are interested in each other, but their friends dissuade them from pursuing a relationship because of their differing social classes ("Dance with Me"). Noah is undeterred, walking Allie home and declaring that he is falling in love with her (“Carry You Home”). Their relationship deepens, and Noah promises to fix up an abandoned house for Allie (“Blue Shutters”). Allie is hesitant to introduce Noah to her parents, upsetting Noah. During the ensuing argument, Noah notices a painting that Allie is holding (“I Paint”). The painting is a gift for him, and he is moved by its melancholic beauty (“Sadness and Joy”).

In the present day, Allie asks Noah to skip ahead in the story. Ten years after they met, Noah, after fighting in Vietnam, has purchased the abandoned house and renovated it, hoping that it will bring Allie back to him (“Leave the Light On”). Meanwhile, Allie has gotten engaged to Lon, a wealthy man her parents approve of. A newspaper article featuring Noah and the restoration of the house catches her eye, shocking her – she wonders if Noah has moved on ("What Happens”). Back in the nursing home, Allie can no longer remember her children or grandchildren ("I Wanna Go Back”).

When Allie first brings Noah to her family's home for dinner that first year, her parents show disapproval of his working-class background, and Noah storms out. Allie's mom informs her they are leaving town the next day. Allie meets up with Noah in the abandoned house ("If This Is Love”), and the two are intimate for the first time (“Kiss Me”). Afterwards, Noah’s friend Fin warns them that Allie’s parents have called the cops on Noah for kidnapping. Before fleeing, Noah memorizes Allie’s home address, promising to write her a letter every day. In the nursing home, Allie begins to remember Noah before suffering from an episode, the stress of which causes Noah to have a stroke. In the post-Vietnam timeframe, Allie leaves for a vacation shortly before her wedding and arrives at Noah’s doorstep ("Home").

Act 2

Noah lays in his hospital bed as his and Allie’s younger selves sing of the things he didn't appreciate when he was young ("We Have to Try"). Allie's condition at the nursing home worsens without him, and she stops eating and speaking. In the middle timeframe, Noah welcomes Allie into the house. She admits she has a fiancé, but their feelings for each other resurface. They go to the docks where they spent time as teenagers, and it begins to pour down rain. Before they kiss, Allie confronts Noah on why he never wrote her. He swears he wrote to her every day, and they spend the night together ("Forever").

In the hospital, Noah reflects on his life with Allie and the beginning of her disease ("Iron in The Fridge"). The morning after their rekindled romance, Noah and Allie argue over their loss of contact over the years and Allie’s engagement to Lon. Allie runs into her mother outside of the house, who reveals that she intercepted Noah’s letters, but will now let Allie decide who to be with ("Don't You Worry"). Allie decides to stay with Lon, breaking Noah’s heart ("It's Not Easy"). Regretful, Allie realizes that she has to make a decision on how to spend her life that she can be proud of ("My Days").

Noah sneaks out of the stroke ward to see his wife again. Visions of all the people he's known in his life appear to him as he makes his way to her room ("I Love You More"). He finds Allie reading the notebook, finally able to remember that this story is of her and Noah ("I Know"). Noah and Allie lay down in bed together, and are found holding each other, both having died peacefully. Everyone in the story appears and sings of the couple's deep love for each other ("Coda").

== Productions ==
=== Workshop (2019) ===
The Notebook was workshopped by the New York Stage and Film at the Powerhouse Theater at Vassar College on June 23, 2019. It was directed by Michael Greif.

On June 12, 2019, the leading actors cast in the show were announced. The cast included Hailey Kilgore as Young Allie, Vanessa Hudgens as Middle Allie, and Candy Buckley as Older Allie; Antonio Cipriano as Younger Noah, Clifton Duncan as Middle Noah, and James Naughton, as Older Noah.

=== Chicago (2022) ===
In September 2022, the show had its "world premiere" at the Chicago Shakespeare Theater. The production featured direction by Michael Greif and Schele Williams, and choreography by Katie Spelman.

Portraying the principal roles of Allie and Noah were Jordan Tyson as Young Allie, Joy Woods as Middle Allie, and Maryann Plunkett, as Older Allie; John Cardoza as Younger Noah, Ryan Vasquez as Middle Noah, and John Beasley as Older Noah.

This production was initially slated for fall 2020, but was delayed by the COVID-19 pandemic. Michaelson and Brunsletter used the additional time to hold online previews and tweak their work.

=== Broadway (2024) ===
The show began previews on February 10, 2024 at the Gerald Schoenfeld Theatre, and officially opened on March 14, 2024. The production has the same creative team as the Chicago production. Casting included Jordan Tyson as Young Allie, Joy Woods as Middle Allie, and, Maryann Plunkett, as Older Allie; John Cardoza as Younger Noah, Ryan Vasquez as Middle Noah, and Dorian Harewood as Older Noah. The musical opened to mixed reviews. The show played its final performance on December 15, 2024.

=== North American Tour (2025–present) ===
A North American tour began on September 6, 2025 at the Playhouse Square in Cleveland, Ohio; it is scheduled to continue into early 2027.

=== Philippines (2026) ===
Theatre Group Asia's production in the Philippines ran from September 3 to 20, 2026, at the Samsung Performing Arts Theater in Makati City in Manila. The all-Filipino cast stars Celeste Legaspi and Rody Vera as Older Allie and Noah, Morissette and Laurence Mossman as Middle Allie and Noah, with Sheena Belarmino and Benedix Ramos as Young Allie and Noah; Nicholas Polonio directs. Reviews were positive. A review in The Post commented that the show "feels fresh without forgetting why people fell for Allie and Noah in the first place. ... Longtime fans will probably cry. Newcomers might cry even harder."

== Musical numbers ==
Act I

- "Time" - Older Noah, Middle Allie, Middle Noah, Younger Allie, Younger Noah, Ensemble
- "Dance With Me" - Fin, Younger Noah, Georgie
- "Carry You Home" - Younger Noah, Younger Allie
- "Blue Shutters" - Younger Noah
- "I Paint" - Younger Allie
- "Sadness and Joy" - Younger Allie, Younger Noah
- "Leave the Light On" - Middle Noah, Ensemble
- "What Happens" - Middle Allie
- "I Wanna Go Back" - Middle Allie, Younger Allie
- "If This Is Love" - Younger Allie, Middle Allie
- "Kiss Me" - Younger Allie, Younger Noah, Middle Allie, Middle Noah, Ensemble
- "Home" - Younger Allie, Younger Noah, Middle Allie, Middle Noah, Ensemble

Act II

- "We Have To Try" - Younger Allie, Younger Noah, Middle Allie, Middle Noah
- "Forever" - Middle Allie, Middle Noah, Younger Allie, Younger Noah, Ensemble
- "Sadness and Joy (Reprise)" - Middle Allie
- "Iron in the Fridge" - Older Noah, Middle Noah, Younger Noah
- "Don't You Worry" - Allie's Mother, Middle Allie
- "It's Not Easy" - Middle Noah, Middle Allie
- "My Days" - Middle Allie
- "I Love You More" - Middle Noah, Middle Allie, Younger Noah, Younger Allie, Ensemble
- "I Know" - Older Allie, Older Noah, Ensemble
- "Coda" - The Company

== Characters and original casts ==
Character	Chicago	Broadway	North American Tour
Character	2022	2024	2025
Younger Noah Calhoun	John Cardoza	John Cardoza	Kyle Mangold
Younger Allison "Allie" Nelson	Jordan Tyson	Jordan Tyson	Chloë Cheers
Middle Noah Calhoun	Ryan Vasquez	Ryan Vasquez	Ken Wulf Clark
Middle Allison "Allie" Nelson	Joy Woods	Joy Woods	Alysha Deslorieux
Older Noah Calhoun	John Beasley	Dorian Harewood	Beau Gravitte
Older Allison "Allie" Calhoun (née Nelson)	Maryann Plunkett	Maryann Plunkett	Sharon Catherine Brown
Nurse Lori / Mother / Others	Andréa Burns	Andréa Burns	Anne Tolpegin
Johnny / Others	Liam Oh	Carson Stewart	Connor Richardson
Fin / Others	Liam Oh	Carson Stewart	Caleb Mathura
Sarah Tuffington / Others	Sophie Madorsky	Hillary Fisher	Makena Jackson
Father / Son / Others	Jonathan Butler-Duplessis	Charles E. Wallace	Jerome Harmann-Hardeman
Georgie / Others	Dorcas Leung	Dorcas Leung	Grace Ohwensadeyo Rundberg
Lon Hammond Jr. / Others	Omar Lopez-Cepero	Chase Del Rey	Jesse Corbin
Nurse Joanna / Others	Yassmin Alers	Yassmin Alers	Rayna Hickman

=== Notable Replacements ===
==== Broadway (2024) ====
- Younger Allie: Anna Zavelson
- Middle Allie: Aisha Jackson

== Awards and nominations ==
=== 2024 Broadway production ===
Year	Award	Category	Nominee	Result
2024	Tony Awards	Best Actor in a Musical	Dorian Harewood	Nominated
2024	Tony Awards	Best Actress in a Musical	Maryann Plunkett	Nominated
2024	Tony Awards	Best Book of a Musical	Bekah Brunstetter	Nominated
2024	Drama League Award	Outstanding Production of a Musical		Nominated
2024	Drama League Award	Distinguished Performance	Dorian Harewood	Nominated
2024	Drama League Award	Distinguished Performance	Maryann Plunkett	Nominated
2024	Outer Critics Circle Awards	Outstanding Lead Performer in a Broadway Musical	Maryann Plunkett	Nominated
2025	Grammy Awards	Grammy Award for Best Musical Theater Album		Nominated
