= The Rugged Path =

1945 play

The Rugged Path is a 1945 play by Robert E. Sherwood.

The initial production marked a return to the stage by Spencer Tracy under the direction of Garson Kanin.
