= Andreas Wijk =

Swedish singer

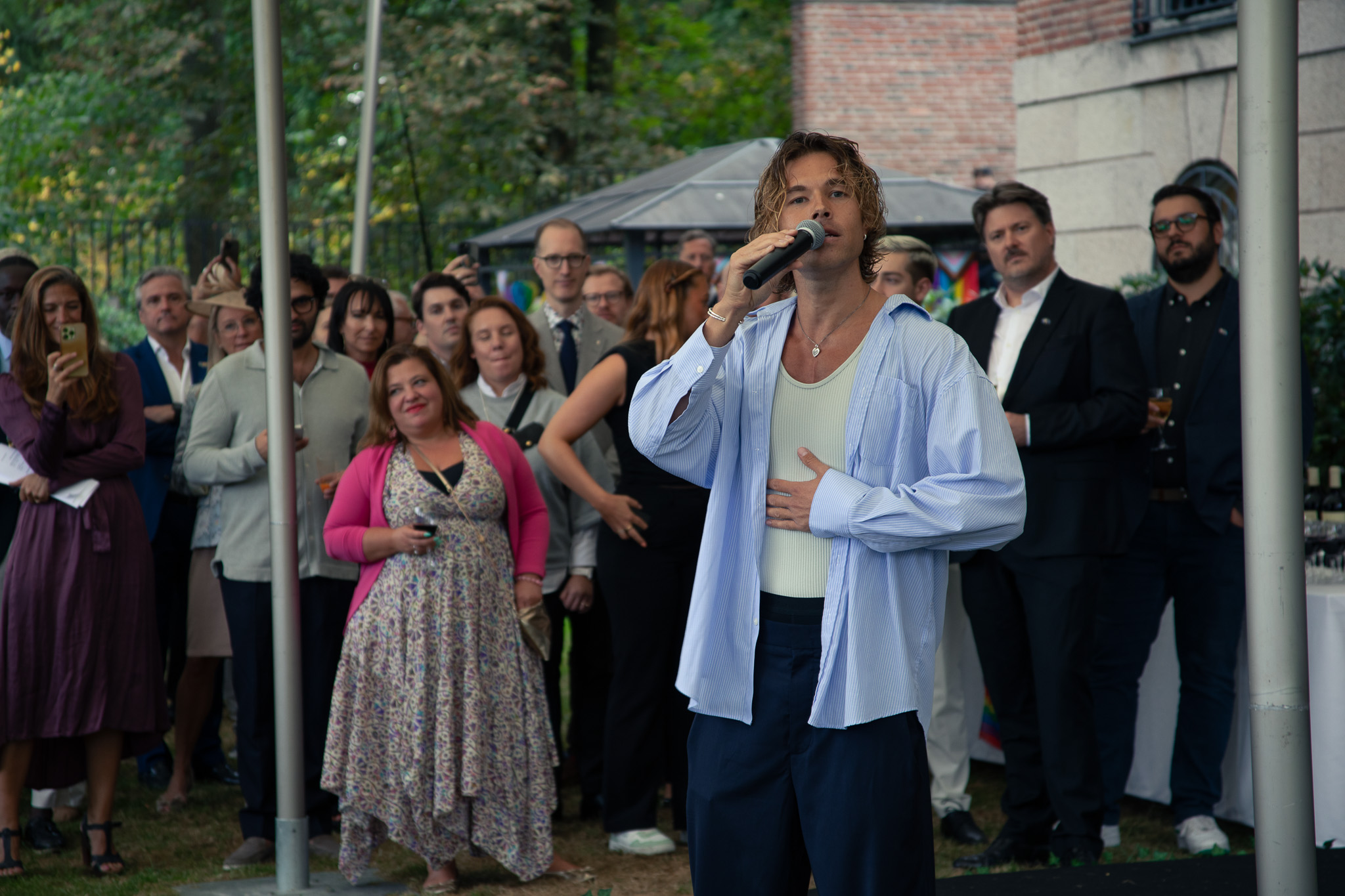
- Born: 17 February 1993; Nybro church parish
- Website: andreaswijk.se

Andreas Mikael Wijk is a Swedish singer and model.

== Biography ==
Andreas Wijk is the son of Pentecostal pastor Thomas Wijk and his wife Ulrika. He grew up in Nybro and Kungälv.

In 2005, Wijk was in the children's pop band Popcorn together with Idol-Alice and Dominique Pålsson Wiklund. As a 16-year-old, he began his music career with song clips on YouTube. In 2011, he was recognized at the Finest-Awards. Wijk initially posted covers of famous artists and, as a teenager, secured a record deal with producer RedOne. However, he later chose to pursue music independently, without a record label.

Wijk gained attention in 2022 with the single "If I was gay", in which he describes the fear of coming out as gay, especially with a background in the free church, and his concerns about the reactions of those around him and his family.

At the QX Gaygala 2023, Wijk was nominated for LGBTQ of the Year. Wijk participated in the entertainment program Let's Dance 2023 and finished in seventh place. In autumn 2023, he played Christian in the musical Moulin Rouge! at the China Theater.
