= Walter Schumann =

American composer for film, television, theater

Walter Schumann (October 8, 1913 – August 21, 1958) was an American composer for film, television, and the theater. His notable works include the score for The Night of the Hunter and the Dragnet Theme; the latter of which earned Schumann the Primetime Emmy Award for Outstanding Music Composition in 1955. His Broadway musical, 3 for Tonight, won the Outer Critics Circle Award for Best Musical in 1955.

== Career ==
Schumann was born in New York City in 1913. By the early 1930s, he was attending law school at USC when he abruptly quit his studies to perform in a college dance band. Eventually, the members of the band went their separate ways but Schumann continued on within the music industry, working with Eddie Cantor on Cantor's radio show, and recording with Andre Kostelanetz.

Following the outbreak of World War II, Schumann enlisted, eventually becoming the musical director of the Armed Forces Radio Service. He worked with most of the major acts of the war on all the radio shows AFRS produced during this time. After the war, he returned to Los Angeles and worked in the movie and television industry as a composer and arranger, mostly on several Abbott & Costello films. In 1949, Schumann was asked to compose a new theme for a police detective show about to make its debut on the NBC Radio network. He began his theme with a four-note motif—quite possibly the second most famous four-note motif after Beethoven's Fifth Symphony. Dragnet became a smash hit on the radio, and then television and Schumann's theme quickly became instantly recognizable.

He wrote one opera, John Brown's Body, which premiered in Los Angeles in 1953 and subsequently ran for sixty-five performances on Broadway at the New Century Theatre. This was followed by the musical revue 3 for Tonight which premiered on Broadway in 1955 in a production directed by and starring Gower Champion. It won the Outer Critics Circle Award for Best Musical in 1955.

Around this time, Schumann gathered together 20 talented vocalists and The Voices Of Walter Schumann was born. The ensemble recorded several easy-listening albums, similar to those recorded by Jackie Gleason, for both Capitol Records and RCA Victor. By 1955, Schumann was busy composing and conducting the score to the classic Robert Mitchum film The Night of the Hunter and won an Emmy for his wildly popular Dragnet theme. He recorded a space-age themed, spoken-word album titled Exploring the Unknown, and his "Voices" troupe recorded a popular, 19-track Christmas album, The Voices of Christmas. The latter album was reissued on compact disc by Collector's Choice Music in November 2007 – 52 years after its initial debut both as an LP and 3-record 45 RPM set. There was a tribute to him on the centennial anniversary of his birth.

== Death ==
In 1956 and 1957 Schumann continued to record with the Voices and they appeared on the first season of NBC's The Ford Show, Starring Tennessee Ernie Ford. However, by the summer of 1958, poor health prompted Schumann to be admitted to the Mayo Clinic, where he underwent one of the first open heart surgeries in the United States. Complications arose following the operation, and Schumann died on August 21, 1958, aged 44, just weeks before the third season of The Tennessee Ernie Ford Show was scheduled to begin. Members of Schumann's "Voices" ensemble were stunned by his sudden death but decided to continue performing. They were renamed "The Top Twenty," and they carried on with Ford for another five years.
