= Abe Koogler =

American playwright

- Born: Vashon, Washington, U.S.
- Occupation: Playwright

Abe Koogler is an American playwright.

Koogler studied playwrighting at the Michener Center for Writers at the University of Texas at Austin and is a graduate of the Juilliard School Playwrighting Fellowship. He received an Obie Award for his play Fulfillment Center that ran Off-Broadway in 2018. In 2018, he received the Dramatists Guild’s Lanford Wilson Award. In 2012, he was awarded the Paula Vogel Playwright Award by the Kennedy Center. He was also 2019-20 Rita Goldberg Playwrights' Workshop Fellow.

His latest play Staff Meal premiered at Playwrights Horizons Off-Broadway in Spring 2024.

== Plays ==
- Staff Meal
- Fulfillment Center
- Kill Floor
- Deep Blue Sound
- Aspen Ideas
- Advance Man
- Lisa My Friend
- Blue Skies Process
