= Gerald Schoenfeld Theatre =

Broadway theater in Manhattan, New York

- Plymouth Theatre
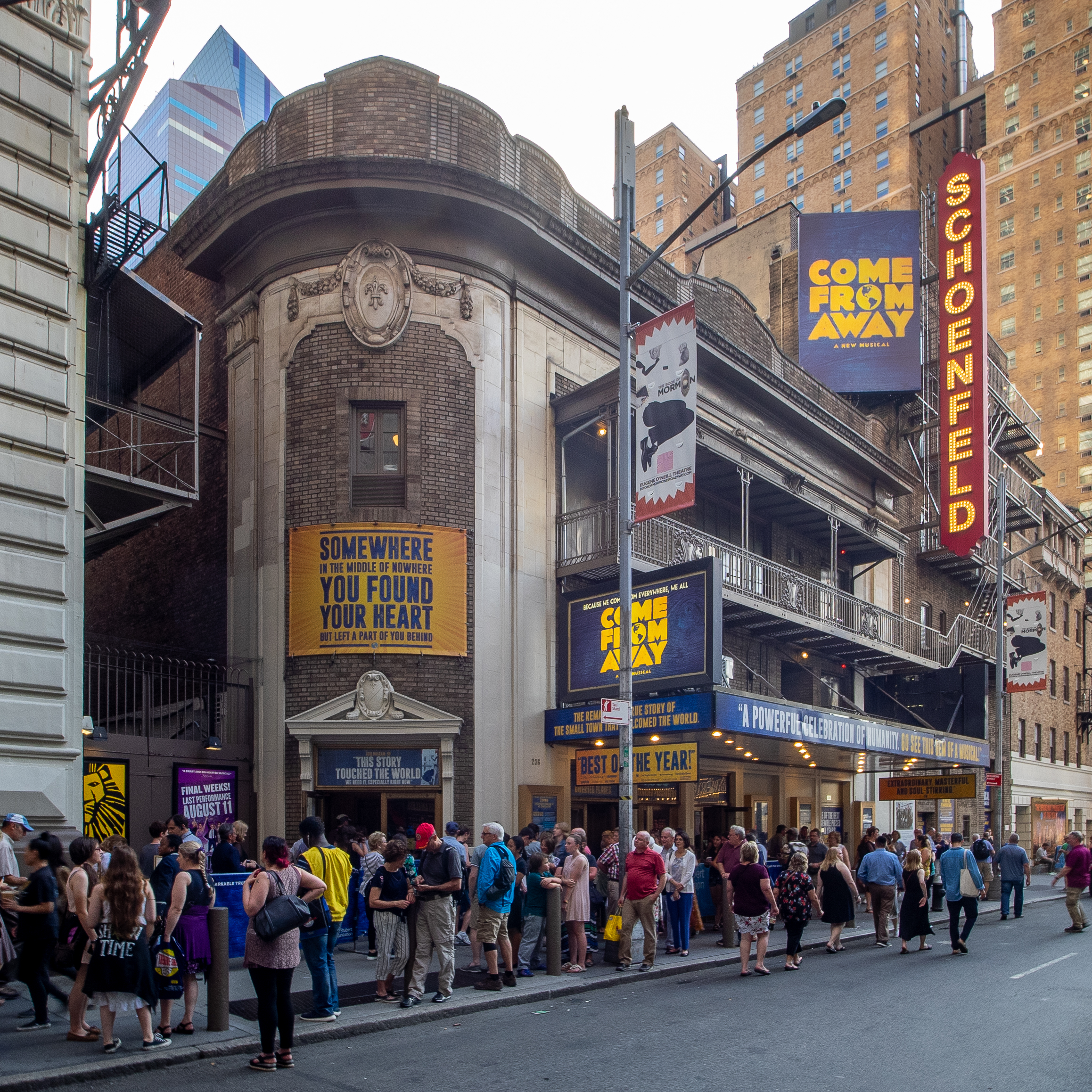
- Come From Away at the Gerald Schoenfeld Theatre (2019)
- Interactive map of Gerald Schoenfeld Theatre
- Address: 236 West 45th Street; Manhattan, New York; United States
- Coordinates: 40°45′31″N 73°59′15″W
- Owner: Schoenfeld Theatre, LLC
- Operator: The Shubert Organization
- Capacity: 1,079
- Type: Broadway
- Production: Buena Vista Social Club
- Public transit: Subway: Times Square–42nd Street/Port Authority Bus Terminal

Construction
- Opened: October 10, 1917 (109 years ago)
- Architect: Herbert J. Krapp

Website
- shubert.nyc/theatres/gerald-schoenfeld/

New York City Landmark
- Designated: December 15, 1987
- Reference no.: 1368
- Designated entity: Facade

New York City Landmark
- Designated: December 15, 1987
- Reference no.: 1369
- Designated entity: Auditorium interior

The Gerald Schoenfeld Theatre (known as the Plymouth Theatre prior to 2004) is a Broadway theater at 236 West 45th Street in the Theater District of Midtown Manhattan in New York City, New York, U.S. Opened in 1917, the theater was designed by Herbert J. Krapp and was built for the Shubert brothers. The Schoenfeld Theatre is named for Gerald Schoenfeld, longtime president of the Shubert Organization, which operates the theater. It has 1,079 seats across two levels. Both the facade and the auditorium interior are New York City landmarks.

The neoclassical facade is simple in design and is similar to that of the Broadhurst Theatre, which was developed concurrently. The Schoenfeld's facade is made of buff-colored brick and terracotta and is divided into two sections: a stage house to the west and the theater's entrance to the east. The entrance facade is topped by fire-escape galleries and contains a curved corner facing east toward Broadway. The auditorium contains an orchestra level, a large balcony, a small technical gallery, a mostly flat ceiling, and a sounding board. The space is decorated in the Adam style with plasterwork designs. Near the front of the auditorium, flanking the elliptical proscenium arch, are box seats at balcony level.

The Shubert brothers developed the Broadhurst and Plymouth theaters following the success of the Booth and Shubert theaters directly to the east. The Plymouth Theatre was leased to Arthur Hopkins and opened on October 10, 1917, with the comedy A Successful Calamity. The Shuberts retained ownership of the theater and took over after Hopkins's death in 1950. The theater has hosted not only musicals but also revues, comedies, and dramas throughout its history. It was renamed for Gerald Schoenfeld in 2005.

== Site ==
The Gerald Schoenfeld Theatre is on 236 West 45th Street, on the south sidewalk between Eighth Avenue and Seventh Avenue, near Times Square in the Theater District of Midtown Manhattan in New York City, New York, U.S. The rectangular land lot covers 9,695 square feet (900.7 m^{2}), with a frontage of 96.5 feet (29.4 m) on 44th Street and a depth of 100.42 feet (31 m). The Schoenfeld Theatre shares the city block with the Row NYC Hotel to the west. It adjoins six other theaters: the Majestic to the southwest, the John Golden and Bernard B. Jacobs to the west, the Booth to the east, the Shubert to the southeast, and the Broadhurst directly to the south. Other nearby structures include the Music Box Theatre, Imperial Theatre, and Richard Rodgers Theatre to the north; the New York Marriott Marquis to the northeast; One Astor Plaza to the east; and Sardi's restaurant, the Hayes Theater, and the St. James Theatre one block south.

The Schoenfeld is part of the largest concentration of Broadway theaters on a single block. The adjoining block of 45th Street is also known as George Abbott Way, and foot traffic on the street increases box-office totals for the theaters there. The Broadhurst, Schoenfeld, Booth, and Shubert theaters were all developed by the Shubert brothers between 44th and 45th Streets, occupying land previously owned by the Astor family. The Broadhurst and Schoenfeld were built as a pair, occupying land left over from the development of the Shubert and Booth, which were also paired. The Broadhurst/Schoenfeld theatrical pair share an alley to the east, parallel to the larger Shubert Alley east of the Shubert/Booth pair. The Broadhurst/Schoenfeld alley was required under New York City construction codes of the time but, unlike Shubert Alley, it was closed to the public shortly after its completion. The Shuberts bought the land under all four theaters from the Astors in 1948.

== Design ==
The Schoenfeld Theatre was designed by Herbert J. Krapp and constructed in 1917 for the Shubert brothers as the Plymouth Theatre. The Broadhurst and Plymouth were two of Krapp's first theatrical designs as an independent architect. While the facades of the two theaters are similar in arrangement, the interiors have a different design both from each other and from their respective facades. The Schoenfeld is operated by the Shubert Organization.

=== Facade ===
Krapp designed the Broadhurst and Plymouth theaters with relatively simple brick-and-stone facades, instead relying on the arrangement of the brickwork for decorative purposes. The Broadhurst and Schoenfeld contain curved corners at the eastern portions of their respective facades, facing Broadway, since most audience members reached the theaters from that direction. The use of simple exterior-design elements was typical of Krapp's commissions for the Shubert family, giving these theaters the impression that they were mass-produced. The Broadhurst and Plymouth theaters' designs contrasted with Henry Beaumont Herts's earlier ornate designs of the Shubert and Booth theaters. Nevertheless, the use of curved east-facing corners was common to all four theaters. The Schoenfeld's facade is divided into two sections: the auditorium to the east and a stage house to the west. The facade is generally shorter than its width.

==== Auditorium section ====
Architectural details of the auditorium facade

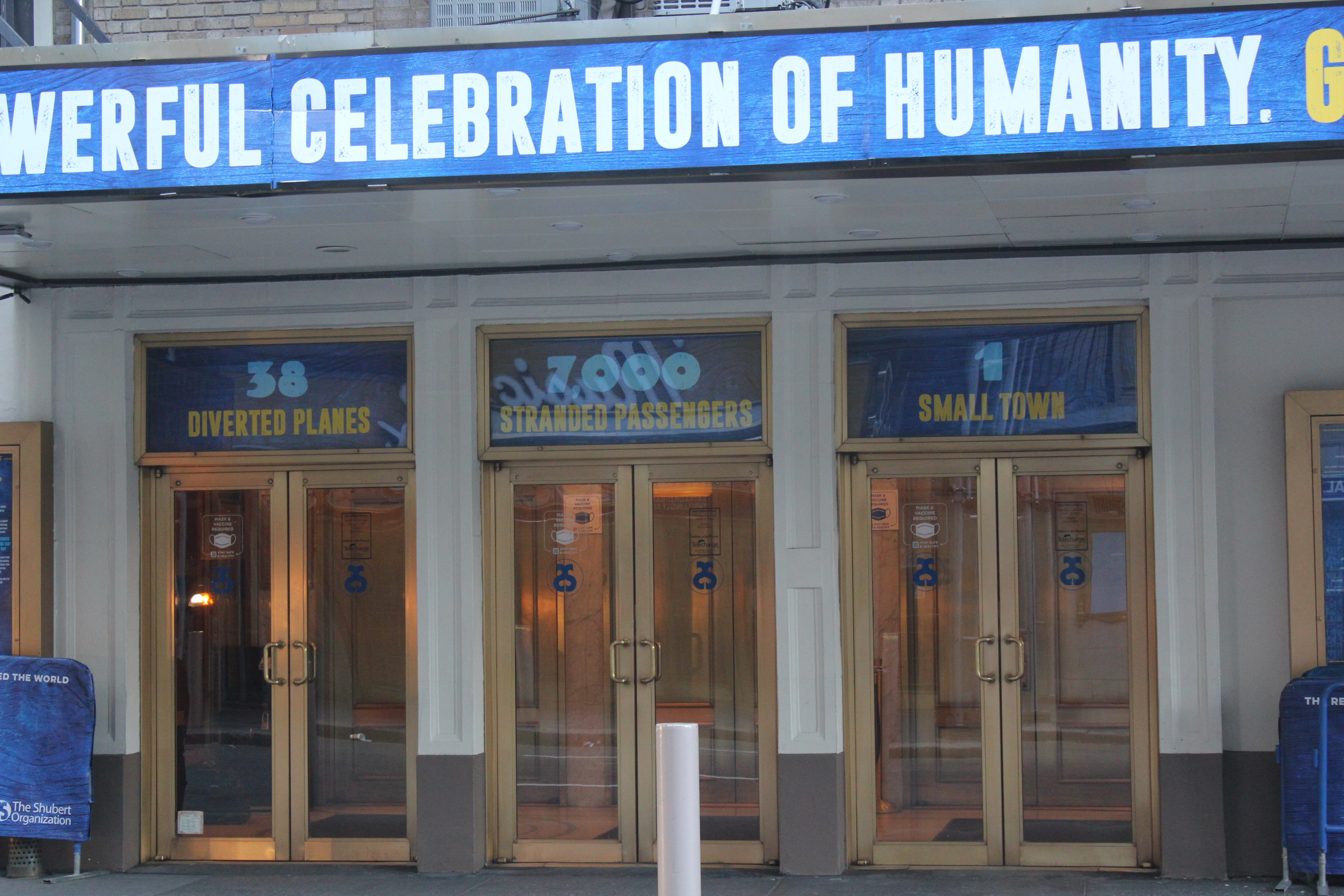
Lobby

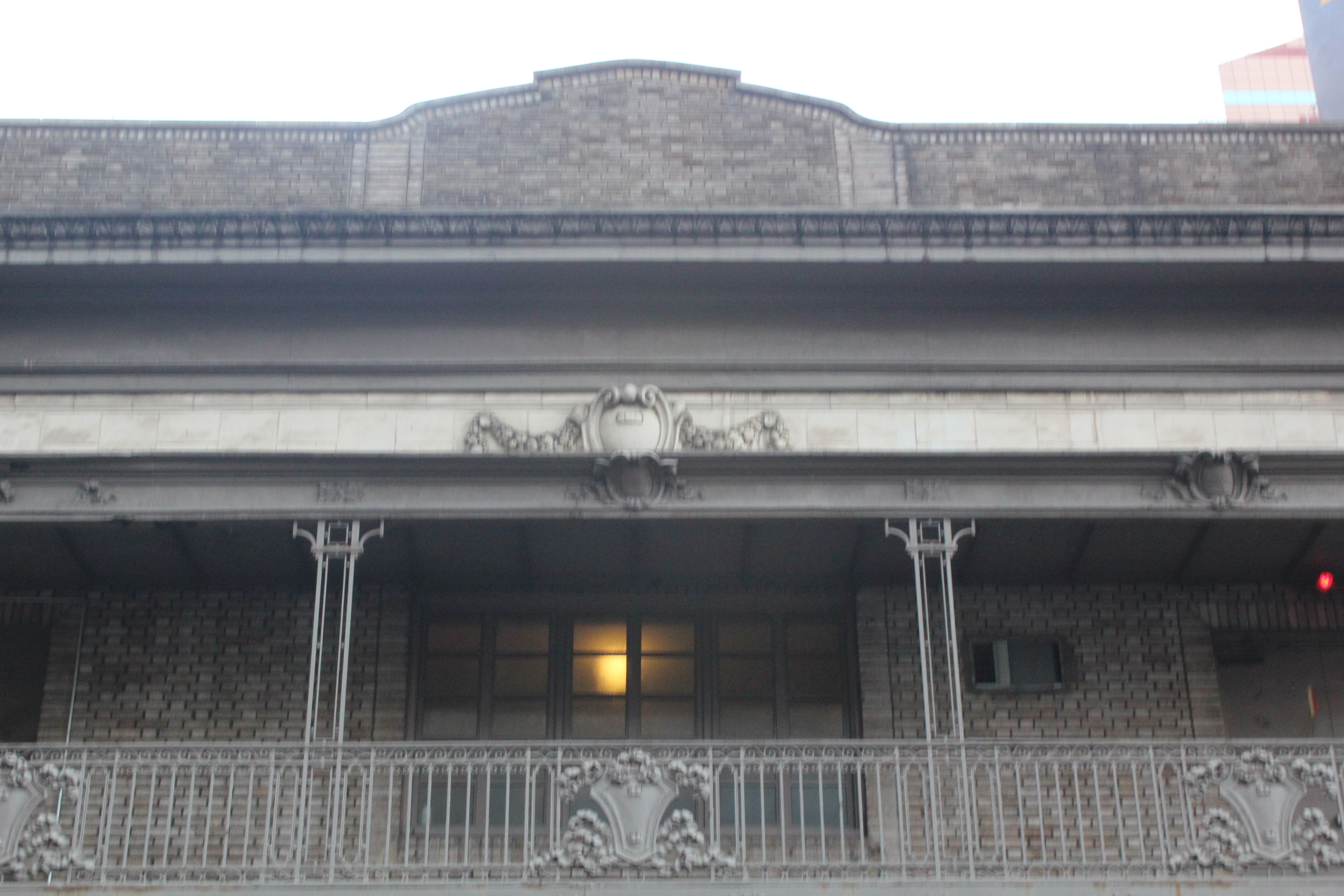
Fire escape on third story, with parapet above

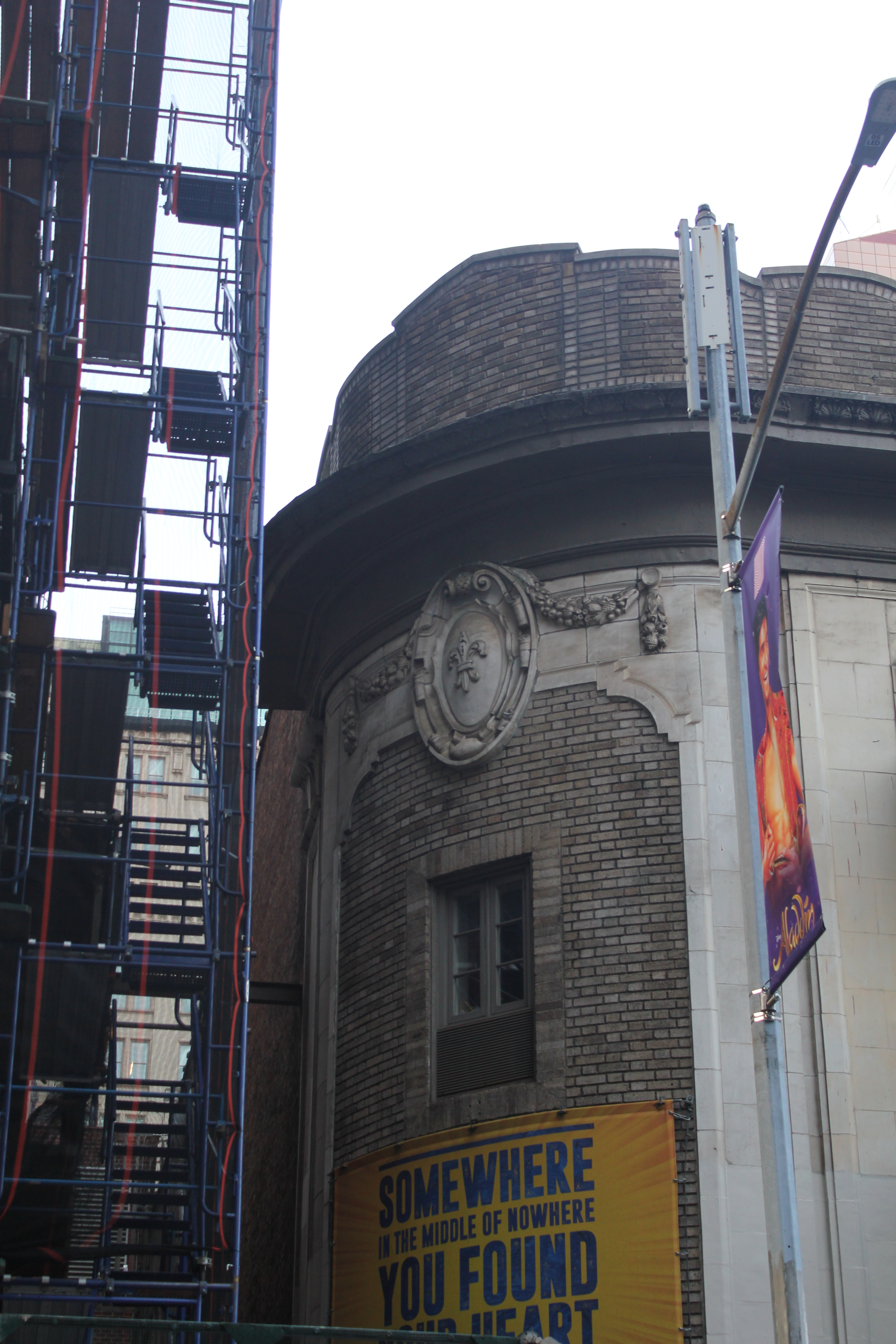
Cartouche and window on curve

The ground floor of the auditorium contains a water table made of granite. The rest of the facade is largely made of architectural terracotta, which surrounds patches of buff brick in Flemish bond. Along the ground floor on 45th Street, there are three glass-and-bronze double doors with aluminum frames and transoms, which lead to the lobby. There are display boxes on either side of the lobby doors, and a bronze stage door is to the right (west) of these doors. A marquee extends above the doors. The northeastern corner of the facade is curved and contains an entrance to the ticket lobby. This entrance contains a double door, above which is a glass transom panel. The corner entrance is topped by a broken pediment, which is supported by console brackets on either side and contains an escutcheon at the center.

Both the curved corner and the 45th Street facade contain terracotta frames, which are flanked by terracotta pilasters with stylized capitals. Along 45th Street, the auditorium's second and third floors contain a fire escape made of cast iron and wrought iron. There are doors and windows on both levels, leading to the fire escape. In addition, the fire escape's third-floor railing contains cast-iron depictions of ribands and shields, while a sheet-metal canopy covers the fire escape. Above the center of the third floor, on 45th Street, is a terracotta cartouche containing depictions of swags. The curved corner contains a third-floor window, topped by an oval escutcheon that is decorated with swags and fleur-de-lis. A terracotta cornice and a brick parapet run above the auditorium facade. The parapet is stepped and contains a coping made of sheet metal.

==== Stage house ====
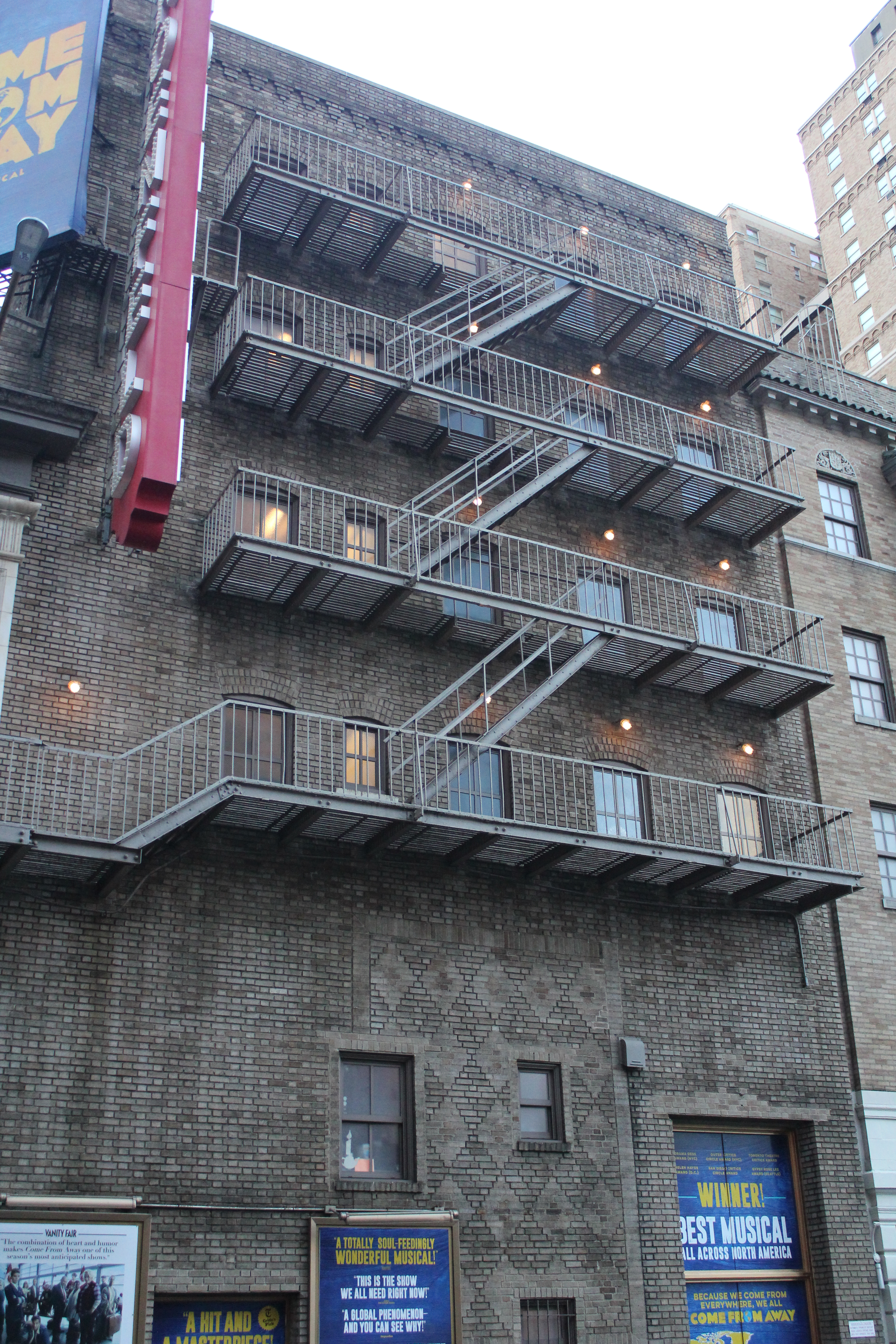
Stage house

The stage house is six stories high. The 45th Street facade is made of buff brick, containing interspersed diamond patterns, and the side walls are faced with plain brick. The ground floor of the stage house contains a granite water table with two metal doors. The western door is double-height, allowing large sets to be transported into the theaters, while the eastern door contains signboard panels. The stage house has five sash windows on each of the third through sixth stories. These windows are placed within segmental arches made of brick. There is a metal fire escape in front of the stage house, which leads to the fire escape in front of the auditorium's third story. A parapet with corbels runs above the sixth story of the stage house.

=== Auditorium ===
The auditorium has an orchestra level, one balcony, boxes, and a stage behind the proscenium arch. The auditorium's width is greater than its depth, and the space is designed with plaster decorations in relief. According to the Shubert Organization and The Broadway League, the theater has 1,079 seats, while according to Playbill, there are 1,046 seats. The physical seats are divided into 653 seats in the orchestra, 392 on the balcony, and 24 in the boxes. There are 15 standing-only spots. The orchestra is wheelchair-accessible, but the balcony can only be reached by stairs. In the basement are restrooms and drinking fountains. The Schoenfeld and the neighboring Jacobs are two of the most desired theaters among producers because of their good sightlines from the seating areas.

The Plymouth was originally decorated in a brown, blue, and gold color scheme. Like Krapp's other commissions for the Shuberts, the Schoenfeld's interior was designed with decorative elements in the Adam style. Low-relief plasterwork was used throughout the auditorium to highlight architectural features. These plasterwork decorations generally depict classical figures playing instruments.

==== Seating areas ====
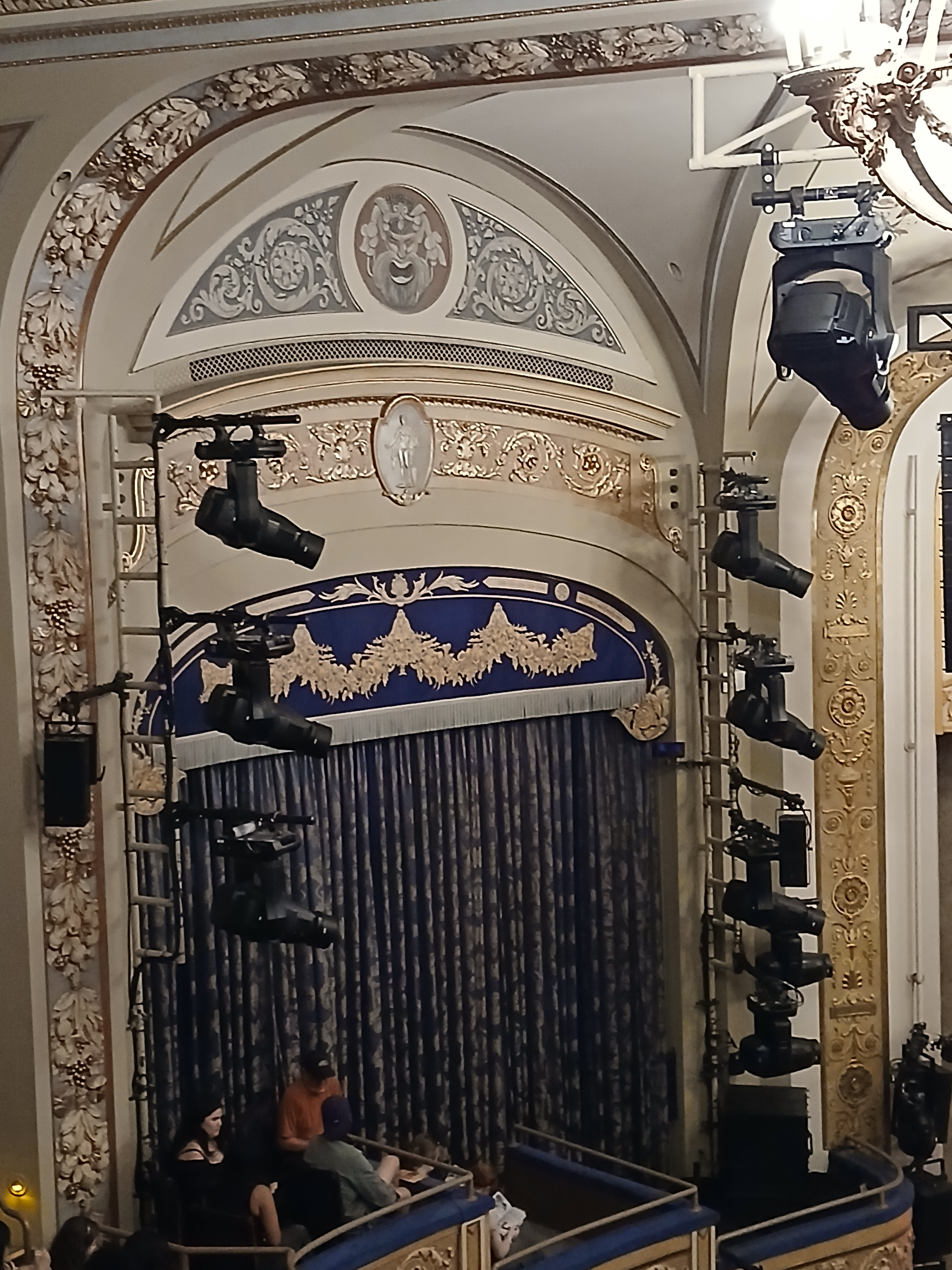
View of the left-wall boxes, with the sounding board rising above them, as seen in 2025

The rear or eastern end of the orchestra contains a promenade. It contains four paneled piers supporting the balcony level. The promenade's ceiling is surrounded by a band of modillions and acanthus leaves. There are also rhombus-shaped panels on the promenade ceiling, which contain chandeliers suspended from medallions. Two staircases with metal railings lead from the promenade to the balcony. The orchestra level is raked, sloping down toward an orchestra pit in front of the stage. The orchestra and its promenade contain walls with plasterwork panels, as well as doorways. On the south (left) and east (rear) walls, the exit doors are placed within deep reveals and are flanked by paneled pilasters, which are topped by brackets. An entablature, a fluted frieze, and a cyma recta cornice run above these doors. The entrance doors on the north (right) wall are more simple in design. On all sides, each doorway has a pediment above the cornice; it consists of a shield with console brackets on either side.

The balcony contains a promenade at its rear, with plasterwork panels on the walls. At the rear of the balcony are four paneled piers (corresponding to those at orchestra level), which are topped by Corinthian-style capitals. These piers support a frieze that depicts sphinxes holding swags, alternating with urns. The balcony's side walls also contain plasterwork panels, above which is an Adam-style cornice. There are doorways with pediments on the side walls, similar to those on the orchestra's south and east walls. Rhombus panels, containing medallions with light fixtures, are placed on the balcony's soffit and underside. There are also air-conditioning vents on the balcony's soffit. In front of the balcony are acanthus-leaf arabesques, which are mostly hidden behind light boxes. There is a small technical gallery above the rear of the balcony. The front railing of the gallery contains moldings of swags.

On either side of the stage is a wall section with three boxes at the balcony level. The boxes step downward toward the stage; the front box curves forward into the proscenium arch, while the rear box curves backward into the balcony. At the orchestra level, there are three rectangular openings, corresponding to the locations of former boxes on that level. The front railings of the boxes contain acanthus-leaf arabesques. The underside of each box is decorated with a medallion containing a light fixture; this is surrounded by a molded band. Above the boxes on either side is an elliptical arch, which contains a curved pediment with acanthus-leaf arabesques on either side of a central medallion. Above the elliptical arch on either side is an arched lunette panel, which supports the ceiling's sounding board.

==== Other design features ====
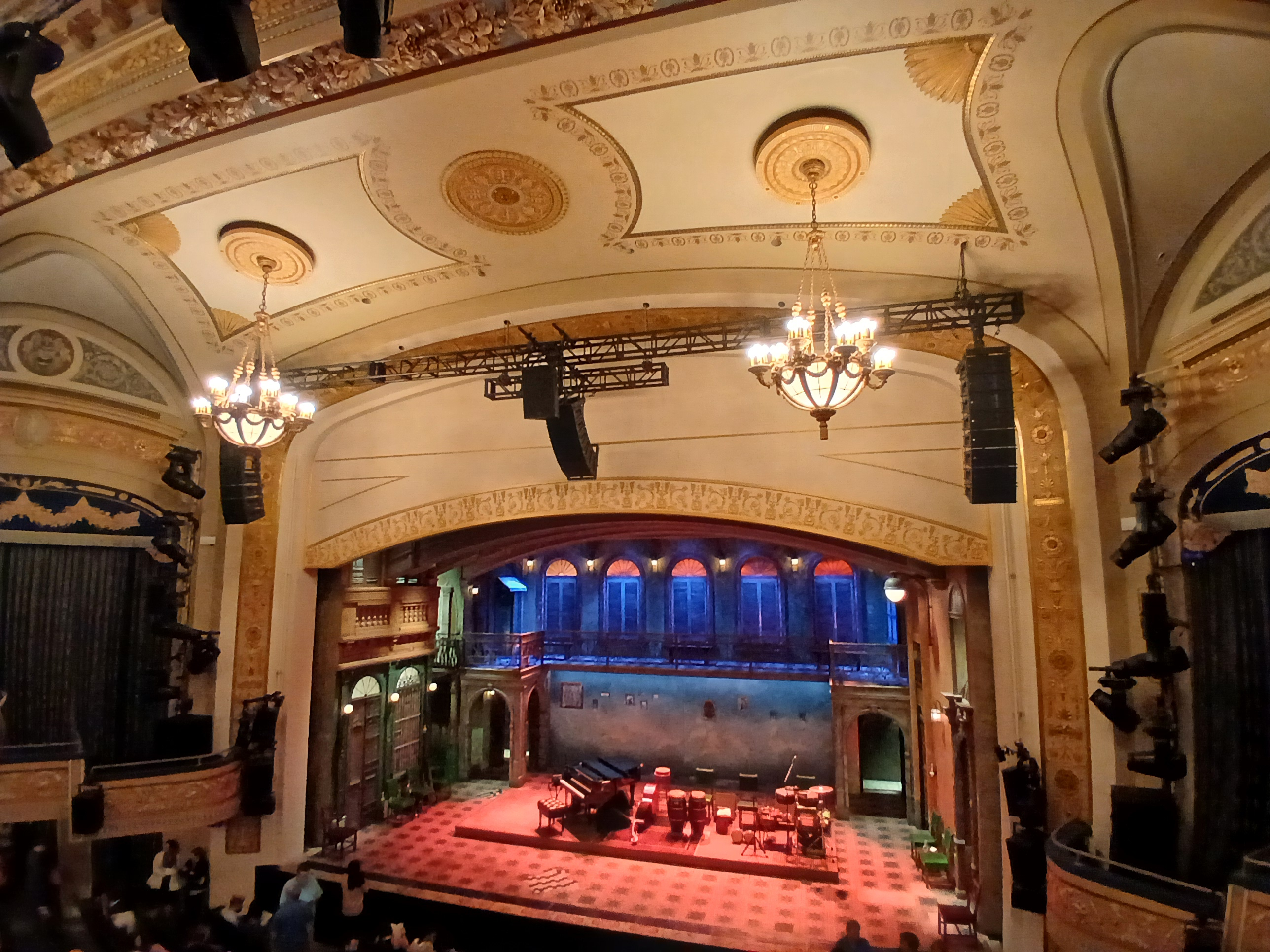
View of the proscenium arch

Next to the boxes is an elliptical, splayed proscenium arch. The archway contains an Adam-style band with vine motifs and medallions. The proscenium opening measures about 38 feet (12 m) tall and 40 feet (12 m) wide. A sounding board curves onto the ceiling above the proscenium arch. The sounding board has a large panel in the center, which is surrounded by a band that depicts acanthus leaves. The outer ends of the sounding board contain circular medallions, from which hang chandeliers. Behind the sounding board and the box seats, a high-relief plasterwork band runs across the ceiling and the side walls. The depth of the auditorium to the proscenium is 26 feet 9 inches (8.15 m), while the depth to the front of the stage is 28 feet 3 inches (8.61 m).

The ceiling is generally flat, except at the front, where it curves down to meet the sounding board. The flat ceiling is surrounded by a molding with acanthus leaves and modillions. Running around the ceiling's perimeter is an Adam-style band with cameo panels depicting fauns and the god Pan; arabesque vines; and urn-and-sphinx motifs. The center of the ceiling contains latticework panels, which encompass circular medallions with overhanging chandeliers. The rear of the ceiling, above the technical gallery, is separated into panels by moldings; some of the panels are circular and contain light fixtures.

== History ==
Times Square became the epicenter for large-scale theater productions between 1900 and the Great Depression. Manhattan's theater district had begun to shift from Union Square and Madison Square during the first decade of the 20th century. From 1901 to 1920, forty-three theaters were built around Broadway in Midtown Manhattan, including the Plymouth Theatre. The Plymouth was developed by the Shubert brothers of Syracuse, New York, who expanded downstate into New York City in the first decade of the 20th century. After the death of Sam S. Shubert in 1905, his brothers Lee and Jacob J. Shubert expanded their theatrical operations significantly. The brothers controlled a quarter of all plays and three-quarters of theatrical ticket sales in the U.S. by 1925.

=== Development and early years ===
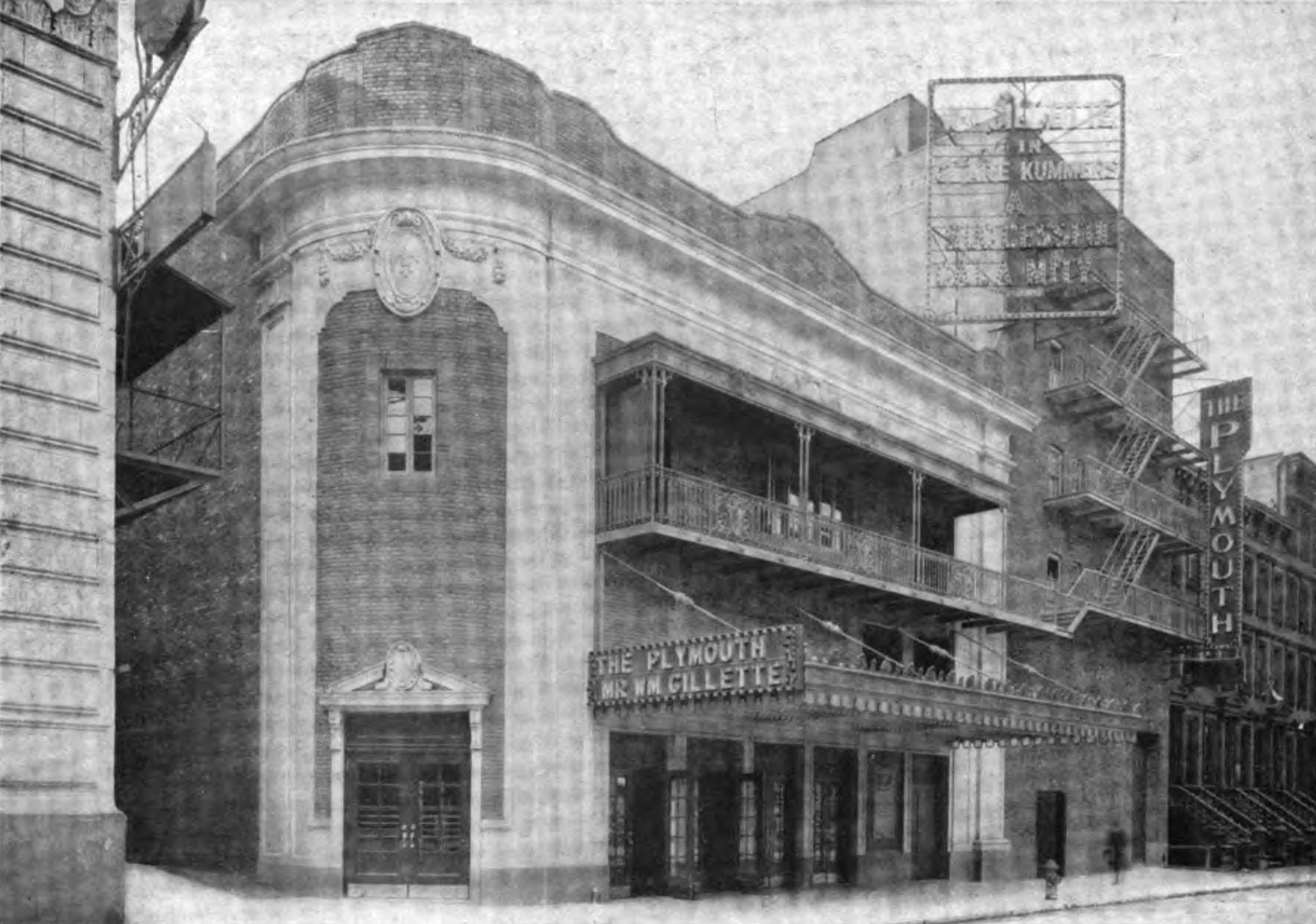
The facade as depicted in Architecture and Building (1918)

The Shubert brothers had constructed the Shubert and Booth theaters as a pair in 1913, having leased the site from the Astor family. Only the eastern half of the land was used for the Shubert/Booth project; following the success of the two theaters, the Shubert brothers decided to develop another pair of theaters to the west. Krapp filed plans for a new theater at 234 West 45th Street with the New York City Department of Buildings in December 1916. Theatrical producer Arthur Hopkins leased the theater on 45th Street from the Shuberts in July 1917. Hopkins, who already operated a smaller theater, had wanted to acquire another theater to increase his profits. Hopkins could name the theater as he wished, but the Shuberts' names had to appear on theatrical programs and on the theater itself. The theater was subsequently named the Plymouth. It was the fourth theater developed by the Shuberts in New York City during 1917, as well as the nineteenth such theater overall. With the Plymouth's completion, the surrounding block of 45th Street had four theaters.

The Plymouth opened on October 10, 1917, with the comedy A Successful Calamity, which had transferred from the Booth Theatre. The theater's first original production, Barbara, opened the next month and was unsuccessful. At the end of the year, Roland Young and Ernest Glendinning starred in The Gipsy Trail, which ran for 111 performances. This was followed in early 1918 by Alla Nazimova's presentation of Henrik Ibsen plays in repertory. Later the same year, Hopkins presented the Tolstoy drama Redemption with John Barrymore, and the Shakespeare tragedy Hamlet was revived with Walter Hampden. The Plymouth hosted another Hopkins production in 1919: Sem Benelli's drama The Jest, featuring John Barrymore and his brother Lionel, which ran for 179 performances.

John Barrymore appeared at the theater yet again in 1920, with the opening of Richard III. This was followed the same year by the comedy Little Old New York, a hit with just over 300 performances. The Plymouth hosted the Zoe Akins drama Daddy's Gone A-Hunting, featuring Marjorie Rambeau and Frank Conroy, in 1921. The next year, Hopkins presented Don Marquis's The Old Soak with Harry Beresford and Minnie Dupree. J. P. McEvoy's family comedy The Potters then opened at the end of 1923, running for 245 performances. Another hit was a play Hopkins directed, the wartime drama What Price Glory?, which opened in September 1924 and had 435 performances. Less successful was the Philip Barry drama In a Garden with Laurette Taylor and Louis Calhern, which opened the next year.

The Jest was revived in early 1926, but without the Barrymore brothers in the starring roles, it lasted for only 78 performances. Afterward, Winthrop Ames staged a revival of Gilbert and Sullivan operettas at the Plymouth Theatre. Both of Ames's shows were hits: Iolanthe opened in April 1926 and ran for 255 performances, while The Pirates of Penzance opened that December for a 128-performance run. In 1927, Hopkins renewed his lease on the theater for ten years, paying $60,000 a year and giving one-fourth of his profits to the Shuberts. The same year, Hopkins and George Manker Watters's play Burlesque opened with Hal Skelly and Barbara Stanwyck; it lasted for 372 performances. Hopkins also directed the next show, Sophie Treadwell's Machinal, which opened in 1928 and featured Zita Johann and Clark Gable. The same year, the theater hosted Philip Barry's play Holiday, featuring Hope Williams.

=== 1930s and 1940s ===
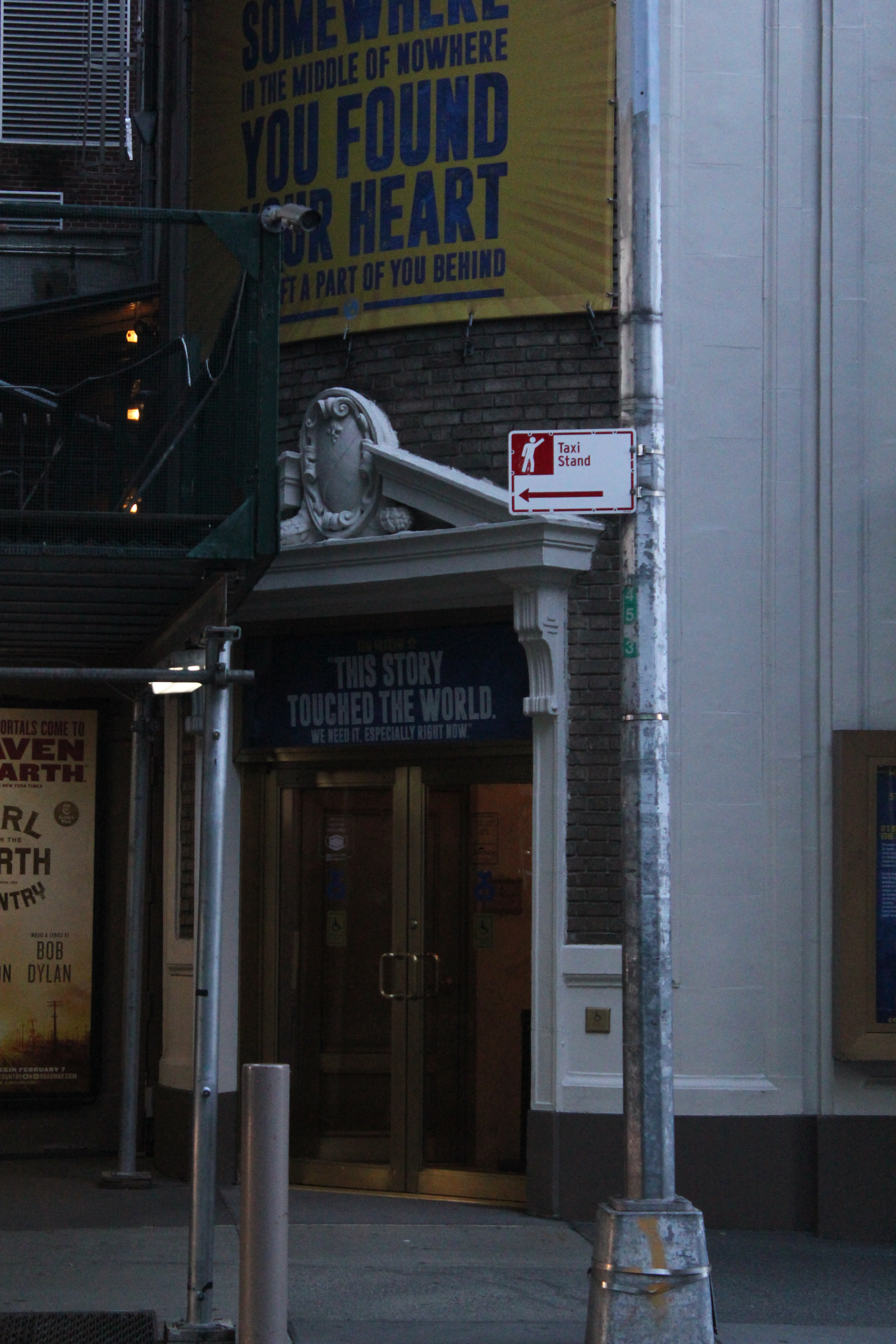
The doorway at the northeast corner of the theater

In 1930, the Plymouth Theatre hosted the Donald Ogden Stewart's play Rebound, in which Stewart co-starred with Hope Williams. Elmer Rice's play Counsellor at Law opened the next year with Paul Muni; after a hiatus in mid-1932, the production returned for the rest of that year. Clare Kummer's comedy Her Master's Voice then opened in 1933, featuring Laura Hope Crews and Roland Young. Meanwhile, the theater had gone into receivership in March 1933, though the receiver then deeded the theater to the Plymouth Theatre Corporation. During 1934, the Plymouth hosted Dark Victory with Tallulah Bankhead and Accent on Youth with Constance Cummings. The next year, the theater hosted Sidney Howard's adaptation of the Humphrey Cobb novel Paths of Glory. This was followed the same year by a theatrical version of Pride and Prejudice, which transferred from the Music Box for a six-month run at the Plymouth.

The theater hosted long-lasting productions in the late 1930s and was hosting shows continuously through the next decade. Among those was Robert E. Sherwood's version of Jacques Deval's Tovarich, featuring Marta Abba and John Halliday, which opened in October 1936 and ran until the next August. Rachel Crothers's play Susan and God then opened in October 1937, with Gertrude Lawrence, and lasted until the next June. Sherwood's Pulitzer Prize-winning play Abe Lincoln in Illinois opened in 1938 and starred Raymond Massey; it ran for one year. This was followed by Margin for Error in late 1939, which relocated to another theater the next year. In 1940, the theater hosted William Saroyan's comedy Love's Old Sweet Song, with Jessie Royce Landis and Walter Huston, but it closed after a month. The comedy Separate Rooms, with Alan Dinehart, Glenda Farrell, and Lyle Talbot, moved to the Plymouth the same year to complete its 612-performance Broadway run. The drama Guest in the House ran for 153 performances in the first half of 1942. It was followed that year by Thornton Wilder's The Skin of Our Teeth with Tallulah Bankhead, which ran for 355 performances.

In 1943, the Plymouth hosted the Dodie Smith play Lovers and Friends with Raymond Massey and Katharine Cornell, which ran for five months. This was followed by a transfer of the comedy Chicken Every Sunday from Henry Miller's Theatre in 1944. The next year, Spencer Tracy starred in The Rugged Path at the theater for 81 performances. In 1946, the theater hosted the musical Lute Song with Mary Martin, Yul Brynner, and Nancy Davis, as well as a revival of Noël Coward's Present Laughter featuring Clifton Webb. Bankhead reappeared at the theater in 1947 for an adaptation of the French play The Eagle Has Two Heads, which lasted for 29 performances. This was followed in 1948 by Joy to the World, featuring Alfred Drake and Marsha Hunt. The same year, Bankhead and Donald Cook appeared in another Coward play, Private Lives, which ran for 248 performances.

=== 1950s to 1970s ===
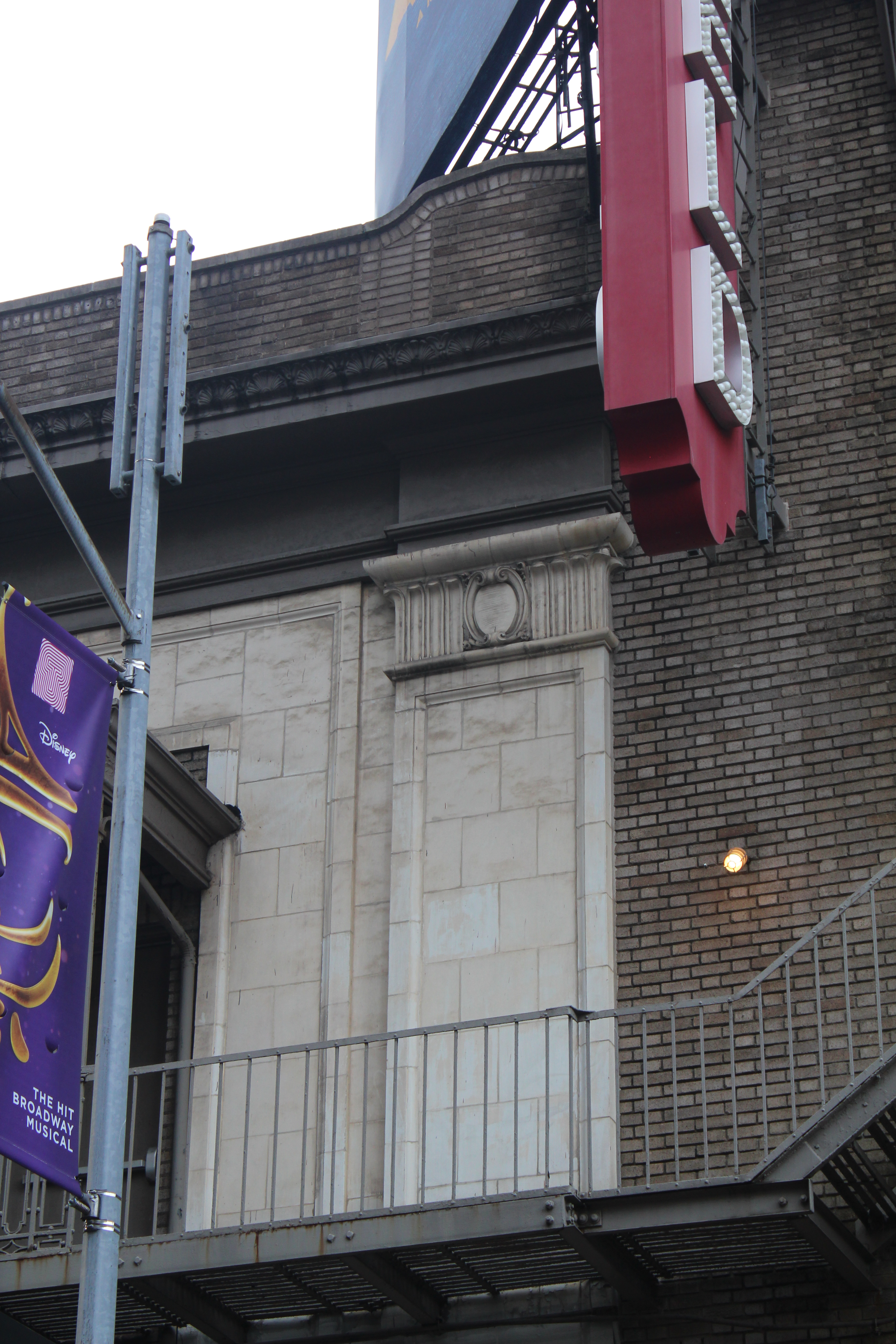
View of a pilaster near the top of the facade

Arthur Hopkins continued to operate the Plymouth Theatre until he died in 1950, after which the Shuberts took over. Samuel Taylor's play Happy Time, produced by Rodgers and Hammerstein, opened the same year with Claude Dauphin, Eva Gabor, and Kurt Kasznar; it lasted 614 performances. Subsequently, Don Juan In Hell opened at the Plymouth in April 1952, featuring Charles Boyer, Cedric Hardwicke, Charles Laughton, and Agnes Moorehead. Later that year, the Frederick Knott drama Dial "M" for Murder opened with Maurice Evans and Gusti Huber, staying for 552 performances. Next was Herman Wouk's play The Caine Mutiny Court-Martial, with Henry Fonda, John Hodiak, and Lloyd Nolan; it opened in 1954 and had 405 performances. The following year, the Plymouth hosted the revue 3 for Tonight with Gower and Marge Champion, Harry Belafonte, and Hiram Sherman, The comedy Janus also opened in 1955, with Margaret Sullavan and Claude Dauphin. The Plymouth hosted a revival of George Bernard Shaw's comedy The Apple Cart in 1956, with Evans and Signe Hasso.

In 1957, the theater staged Arnold Schulman's play A Hole in the Head, as well as Peter Ustinov's comedy Romanoff and Juliet. Afterward, the comedy The Marriage-Go-Round with Charles Boyer, Claudette Colbert, Julie Newmar, and Edmon Ryan opened at the theater in 1958; it ran for two years. The musical Irma La Douce opened at the Plymouth in 1960, featuring Elizabeth Seal and Keith Michell. The theater next hosted the Paddy Chayefsky play Gideon in 1961, with Fredric March, and Tchin-Tchin in 1962 with Anthony Quinn and Margaret Leighton. In 1963, the Plymouth was home to a short run of Lillian Hellman's play My Mother, My Father and Me, as well as a more successful adaptation of Arnold Wesker's West End play Chips with Everything. The play Dylan opened at the theater in 1964, with Alec Guinness and Kate Reid. It was followed that year by William Hanley's first Broadway play, Slow Dance on the Killing Ground.

The Neil Simon comedy The Odd Couple premiered at the Plymouth with Walter Matthau and Art Carney in 1965, staying for over a year before it transferred. Simon's next show at the theater, The Star-Spangled Girl with Richard Benjamin, Anthony Perkins, and Connie Stevens, opened at the end of 1966, running until August 1967. Edward Albee's play Everything in the Garden followed in 1967. Simon's next hit at the Plymouth was Plaza Suite, which opened in 1968 with Maureen Stapleton and George C. Scott; it had 1,097 performances over the next two years. Simon's drama The Gingerbread Lady premiered in late 1970, featuring Stapleton, and ran for 193 performances.

Even in the 1970s, the Plymouth continued to host successes. The Jean Kerr play Finishing Touches opened in February 1973, featuring Barbara Bel Geddes and James Woods, and ran for 164 performances over the next five months. Later that year, Peter Cook and Dudley Moore collaborated on the revue Good Evening. The theater then hosted Peter Shaffer's West End play Equus in 1974, which ran for the next two years before transferring. Another West End play came to the Plymouth in 1977, Simon Gray's Otherwise Engaged featuring Tom Courtenay; it ran for ten months. The Elizabeth Swados musical Runaways relocated from The Public Theater to the Plymouth in May 1978, with 274 performances on Broadway. Next, the Fats Waller revue Ain't Misbehavin' relocated from the Longacre to the Plymouth in 1979, staying for two years.

=== 1980s and 1990s ===
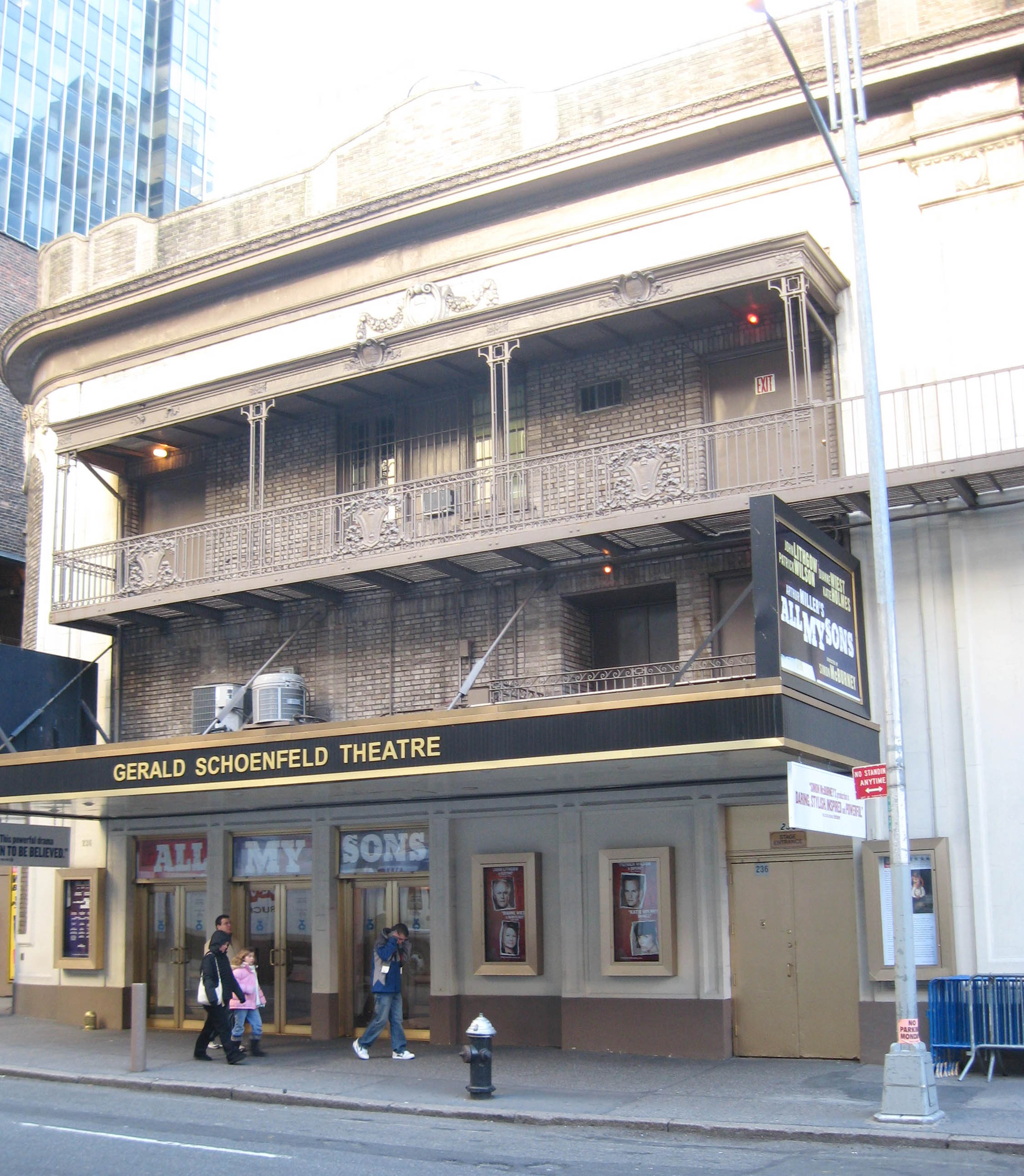
View of the auditorium facade, with fire escapes on it

In 1981, the Plymouth Theatre hosted the play Piaf with Jane Lapotaire, which ran for four months. Later that year, catwalks were installed within the theater to accommodate the Royal Shakespeare Company's production of The Life and Adventures of Nicholas Nickleby, which ran for three months. The play was unusual not only for its high ticket price of $100 but also for the eight-hour duration of each performance. The next year, the Circle in the Square Theatre presented Ugo Betti's The Queen and the Rebels with Colleen Dewhurst. The New York Shakespeare Festival presented David Hare's play Plenty in 1984, with Kate Nelligan and Edward Herrmann, followed the same year by a revival of the George S. Kaufman and Moss Hart play You Can't Take It With You. In 1984, the Plymouth hosted the play The Real Thing by Tom Stoppard, featuring Christine Baranski, Glenn Close, and Jeremy Irons; it ran for 566 performances over the next year and a half. Lily Tomlin appeared in a solo show the next year, The Search for Signs of Intelligent Life in the Universe.

The New York City Landmarks Preservation Commission (LPC) had started considering protecting the Plymouth as a landmark in 1982, with discussions continuing over the next several years. The LPC designated the Plymouth's facade and interior as landmarks on December 15, 1987. This was part of the LPC's wide-ranging effort in 1987 to grant landmark status to Broadway theaters. The New York City Board of Estimate ratified the designations in March 1988. The Shuberts, the Nederlanders, and Jujamcyn collectively sued the LPC in June 1988 to overturn the landmark designations of 22 theaters, including the Plymouth, on the merit that the designations severely limited the extent to which the theaters could be modified. The lawsuit was escalated to the New York Supreme Court and the Supreme Court of the United States, but these designations were ultimately upheld in 1992.

The Plymouth hosted the George Bernard Shaw play Pygmalion in 1987, with Amanda Plummer and Peter O'Toole. It was followed the same year by Lanford Wilson's play Burn This, featuring John Malkovich and Joan Allen, which ran for 437 performances over the next year. Next, Wendy Wasserstein's The Heidi Chronicles moved to the Plymouth from the off-Broadway Playwrights Horizons theater in March 1989, staying for a year and a half. The Plymouth hosted a short run of The Big Love with Tracey Ullman in 1991, followed the same year by the Brian Friel drama Dancing at Lughnasa, the latter of which had 421 performances. The flamenco dance special Gypsy Passion was hosted at the Plymouth in late 1992, following an engagement at Town Hall. The next year, the theater hosted The Song of Jacob Zulu and a short run of Wonderful Tennessee. The Stephen Sondheim musical Passion opened at the Plymouth in 1994, followed by Brian Friel's Translations in 1995 and the Lincoln Center Theater's revival of Edward Albee's A Delicate Balance in 1996. The theater's last show of the 20th century was the musical Jekyll & Hyde, which opened in April 1997 and ran for 1,543 performances through the beginning of 2001.

=== 2000s to present ===
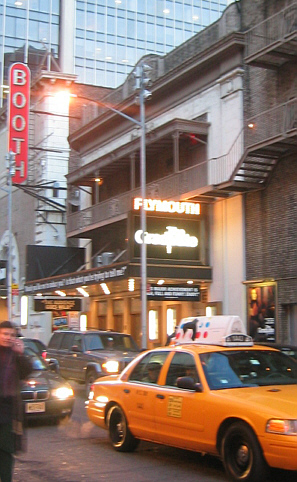
Plymouth Theatre, showing The Graduate, 2003

The Plymouth's first new production of the 2000s was a revival of the Betty Comden, Adolph Green, and Jule Styne musical Bells Are Ringing, which opened in April 2001 with Faith Prince; it ran for two months. This was followed the same year by Thou Shalt Not, which ran for three months. The play The Graduate, which opened in April 2002 and was based on the film of the same name, ran for nearly a year. Next to be staged was a revival of Eugene O'Neill's play Long Day's Journey into Night as well as the musical Taboo in 2003. As part of a settlement with the United States Department of Justice in 2003, the Shuberts agreed to improve disabled access at their 16 landmarked Broadway theaters, including the Plymouth. The Stephen Belber drama Match was shown at the Plymouth during early 2004.

In September 2004, the Shubert Organization's board of directors voted to rename the Plymouth for then-current president Gerald Schoenfeld, as well as the neighboring Royale for its longtime president Bernard B. Jacobs. The two theaters were officially renamed with a marquee replacement ceremony on May 9, 2005. While Schoenfeld appeared to be proud of the renaming, the renaming was controversial among producers and theatrical fans, despite the longstanding tradition of renaming Broadway houses after their producers. The musical Brooklyn, which had opened in October 2004 before the renaming was finalized, (Note: Brooklyn had opened after the renaming was announced but before it occurred.) had 284 performances. The first two shows at the renamed theater were not successful; Chita Rivera: The Dancer's Life opened in late 2005 and ran for two months, while The Caine Mutiny Court-Martial flopped after two weeks in May 2006. Conversely, the musical A Chorus Line opened in October 2006, running for almost two years. This was followed by All My Sons in 2008, as well as Impressionism and A Steady Rain in 2009.

In the early 2010s, the Schoenfeld hosted a mixture of musicals and plays, which generally ran only a few months. The short runs were required because of the shortage of available Broadway theaters. They included A Behanding in Spokane and A Life in the Theatre in 2010; The Motherfucker with the Hat and Bonnie & Clyde in 2011; The Best Man and Glengarry Glen Ross in 2012; and Orphans in 2013. Subsequently, the Schoenfeld was renovated in 2014. The Schoenfeld continued to host short runs of plays and musicals into the mid-2010s, with The Bridges of Madison County and It's Only a Play in 2014; The Audience and China Doll in 2015; and American Psycho in 2016. The play The Humans relocated from the Helen Hayes Theatre to the Schoenfeld in 2016, a relatively rare move that was required because the Hayes was being renovated. The Humans had to close at the beginning of 2017 to make way for the musical Come from Away, which opened in March 2017. Come From Away continued at the Schoenfeld for four years until the theater closed on March 12, 2020, due to the COVID-19 pandemic. The Schoenfeld reopened on September 21, 2021, with Come From Away, which closed in October 2022 as the theater's longest-running show. This was followed the same month by Take Me Out, which had transferred from the Hayes Theater. Life of Pi opened at the theater in March 2023, running for four months. This was followed in 2024 by the musical The Notebook, running for nine months. Afterward, the musical Buena Vista Social Club opened there in March 2025 and is scheduled to close in January 2027.

== Notable productions ==
Productions are listed by the year of their first performance.

=== Plymouth Theatre ===
Notable productions at the theater
Opening year	Name	Refs.
1917	A Successful Calamity	
1918	The Wild Duck	
1918	Hedda Gabler	
1918	A Doll's House	
1918	Redemption	
1918	Hamlet	
1918	Macbeth	
1919	As You Like It	
1920	Richard III	
1922	The Hairy Ape	
1922	The Old Soak	
1923	The Potters	
1924	What Price Glory?	
1926	The Jest	
1926	Iolanthe	
1926	The Pirates of Penzance	
1927	Burlesque	
1928	Machinal	
1928	Holiday	
1930	Rebound	
1931	Once in a Lifetime	
1931	Counsellor at Law	
1933	Her Master's Voice	
1934	Dark Victory	
1934	Accent on Youth	
1935	Pride and Prejudice	
1937	Susan and God	
1938	Shadow and Substance	
1938	Abe Lincoln in Illinois	
1939	Margin for Error	
1942	The Skin of Our Teeth	
1943	The Naked Genius	
1944	Chicken Every Sunday	
1945	Ten Little Indians	
1945	The Rugged Path	
1946	Lute Song	
1946	Hidden Horizon	
1946	Present Laughter	
1947	The Eagle Has Two Heads	
1947	Call Me Mister	
1948	Happy Birthday	
1948	Private Lives	
1949	Diamond Lil	
1950	The Happy Time	
1952	Women of Twilight	
1952	Don Juan In Hell	
1952	Three Wishes for Jamie	
1952	Dial M for Murder	
1954	The Caine Mutiny Court Martial	
1955	3 for Tonight	
1955	Tiger at the Gates	
1955	Janus	
1956	A Hatful of Rain	
1956	The Apple Cart	
1957	A Hole in the Head	
1957	Romanoff and Juliet	
1958	The Marriage-Go-Round	
1960	From A to Z	
1960	Irma la Douce	
1961	Gideon	
1962	Tchin-Tchin	
1963	The Beauty Part	
1963	Chips with Everything	
1964	Dylan	
1965	The Odd Couple	
1966	The Star-Spangled Girl	
1967	Everything in the Garden	
1968	Plaza Suite	
1970	The Gingerbread Lady	
1972	Twigs	
1974	Equus	
1976	Godspell	
1977	Otherwise Engaged	
1977	The Merchant	
1978	The Water Engine	
1978	Eliot Feld Ballet	
1978	Runaways	
1979	Ain't Misbehavin'	
1981	Piaf	
1981	The Life and Adventures of Nicholas Nickleby	
1983	Plenty	
1983	You Can't Take It With You	
1984	The Real Thing	
1985	The Search for Signs of Intelligent Life in the Universe	
1986	The House of Blue Leaves	
1987	Pygmalion	
1987	Burn This	
1989	The Heidi Chronicles	
1991	The Big Love	
1991	Dancing at Lughnasa	
1993	The Song of Jacob Zulu	
1994	Passion	
1995	Translations	
1995	Chronicle of a Death Foretold	
1996	A Delicate Balance	
1997	Jekyll & Hyde	
2001	Bells Are Ringing	
2001	Thou Shalt Not	
2002	The Graduate	
2003	Long Day's Journey into Night	
2003	Taboo	
2004	Match	
2004	Brooklyn the Musical	

=== Gerald Schoenfeld Theatre ===
Notable productions at the theater
Opening year	Name	Refs.
2005	Chita Rivera: The Dancer's Life	
2006	The Caine Mutiny Court-Martial	
2006	A Chorus Line	
2008	All My Sons	
2009	Impressionism	
2009	A Steady Rain	
2010	A Behanding in Spokane	
2010	A Life in the Theatre	
2011	The Motherfucker with the Hat	
2011	Bonnie & Clyde	
2012	The Best Man	
2012	Glengarry Glen Ross	
2013	Orphans	
2014	The Bridges of Madison County	
2014	It's Only a Play	
2015	The Audience	
2015	China Doll	
2016	American Psycho	
2016	The Humans	
2017	Come from Away	
2022	Take Me Out	
2023	Life of Pi	
2024	The Notebook	
2025	Buena Vista Social Club	

== Box-office records ==
The limited engagement drama A Steady Rain achieved the box office record for the Gerald Schoenfeld Theatre. The production grossed $1,292,210 over eight performances for the week ending December 6, 2009. This record was surpassed by the 2014 production It's Only a Play, which grossed $1,455,818 over eight performances for the week ending January 4, 2015. The current record for the Gerald Schoenfeld Theatre was set by the 2017 musical Come From Away. The production grossed $1,834,218 over nine performances for the week ending December 31, 2017.

== See also ==
- List of Broadway theaters
- List of New York City Designated Landmarks in Manhattan from 14th to 59th Streets
