= List of LGBTQ theatre companies =

This is a list of theatre companies specializing in LGBTQ theatre.

== Australia ==
- ActNow Theatre, theatre company based in Adelaide, South Australia

== Canada ==
- Buddies in Bad Times, Canadian theatre company based in Toronto, Ontario
- Frank Theatre Company, Canadian theater company, based in Vancouver, British Columbia

== United Kingdom ==
- Above the Stag Theatre, Off-West End theatre company in London
- Aputheatre, theatre company in Brighton, England
- Gay Sweatshop, Britain's first professional gay theatre company.
- Milk Presents, English LGBTQIA+ theatre company based in Derby

== United States ==
- Arts Project of Cherry Grove
- Celebration Theatre, theatre company in Los Angeles
- The Five Lesbian Brothers, American theater company based in New York City
- New Conservatory Theatre Center, Queer Theatre and Education Company in San Francisco, founded in 1981
- Pomo Afro Homos, African-American gay theater troupe founded in San Francisco
- Split Britches, American performance troupe based in New York City
- StageQ, theatre company based in Madison, Wisconsin.
- The Theater Offensive, Boston-based theatrical organization
- Theatre Rhinoceros, gay and lesbian theatre based in San Francisco
- Triangle Productions, theatre company based in Portland, Oregon
- Triangle Theater Company, defunct LGBT+ theatrical organization in Boston
