= LGBTQ theatre =

Theatre based on LGBTQ experience

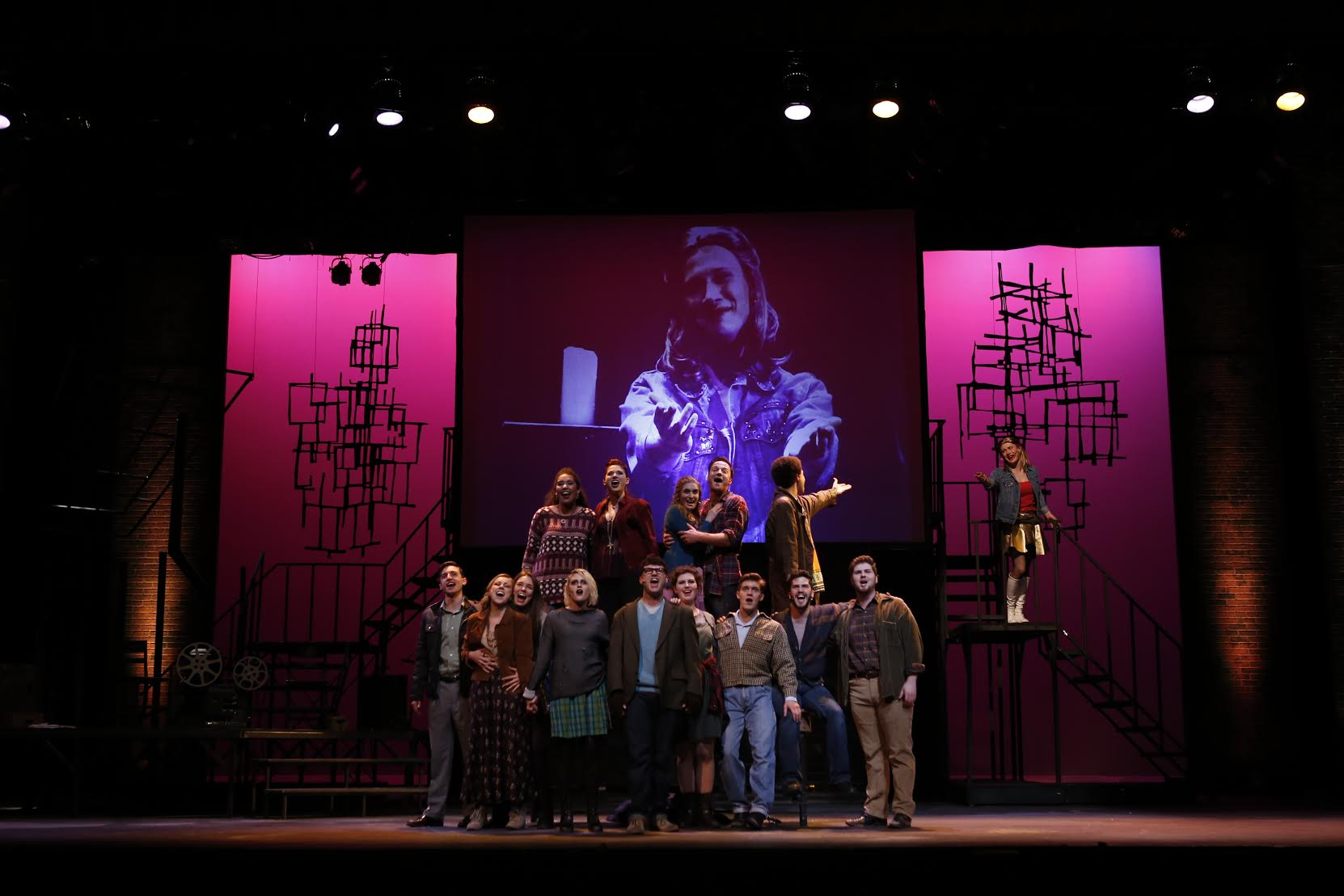
Performance of Rent, a 1996 musical with gay and bisexual characters

LGBTQ theatre (also known as gay, lesbian, or queer theatre) is based on the lives of LGBTQ people and their culture. Subsets of LGBTQ theatre may focus on the experiences of specific populations, such as gay men, lesbians, or trans people. Collectively, LGBTQ theatre forms a part of LGBTQ culture.

Famous examples of LGBTQ theatre include the musical Rent by Jonathan Larson and the play Bent by Martin Sherman.

== History of LGBTQ theatre ==
=== Ancient Greece ===
In Ancient Greece, homosexuality was considered normal and was promoted in some settings. In Thebes, it was actively practiced and legally "incentivized". The theater was considered a "tool to promote society's values", and homosexuality was showcased in these plays. In Aristophanes' play The Knights, the protagonist Agoracritus openly admits to having been a "passive" partner. In another one of Aristophanes' plays, Thesmophoriazusae, the character of Euripides directs what could be seen as homophobic comments to his colleague Agathon. Other characters in the play ridicule his behavior and point out their obsession with masculinity. As the play is a comedy, many have interpreted the character as humorous.

=== Pre-20th century ===
Due to both social and legal discrimination, LGBTQ themes were hidden from theatrical audiences in the centuries following the downfall of Ancient Greece and leading up to the 20th century. However, there are examples of LGBTQ playwrights before 1900, such as Oscar Wilde (1854–1900), who imbued their theatrical works with their personality while keeping their sexual orientation a secret. Throughout the 18th and 19th centuries, the idea of homosexuality was not only stigmatized, but also criminalized in many places around the world. In the UK before 1861, the punishment for the act of sodomy was execution. Additionally, there was a shift in the understanding of homosexuality in the 18th century where to "commit sodomy" became no longer simply an act but a larger stain on one's entire identity, making one a "sodomite". It would have been incredibly dangerous for playwrights, actors, producers, or anyone involved in a theatrical production to put on a play with homosexual characters during those years.

However, gender-bending has a long theatrical tradition. In the era of Shakespeare, men would play women's roles in theatre. Women were not allowed to be actors, so men would dress up like women to portray female characters in the plays. This continued until the 19th century, when the popularisation of opera allowed women to act on stage.

=== Mid-20th century ===
==== United States ====
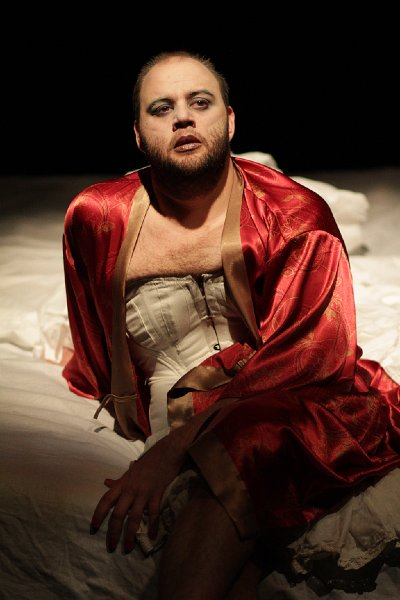
Michael-Alan Read as drag queen Leslie Bright in a 2014 production of The Madness of Lady Bright

In the United States, the New York City theatre scene was the center of LGBTQ theatre in the country during the mid-20th century. Caffe Cino was the birthplace of Off-Off Broadway, where The Madness of Lady Bright, the first admittedly LGBTQ play, was performed in 1964. It was the longest-running show at the Caffe Cino, being performed over 200 times to packed houses.

Four years later, the first LGBTQ play to be on Off-Broadway, was performed, The Boys in the Band. This play garnered serious attention, as it was performed at a legitimate playhouse. Although reactions were mixed, The Boys in the Band cemented a legacy for itself and is considered one of the classic LGBTQ plays.

By 1983, a mainstream LGBTQ musical on Broadway was performed. La Cage aux Folles was a musical based on the 1978 movie La Cage aux Folles. The story surrounds a middle-aged homosexual couple who learn how deep their love truly is after navigating obstacles. The play was groundbreaking because of the characterizations of its main characters, one being the owner of a Saint-Tropez drag club and the other its star performer. The play received high praise and won the Tony Award for Best Musical in 1984. It was performed 1,761 times and was revived in the fall of 2004.

=== Late 20th-21st century ===
==== United States ====
The mid-20th century saw the rise of LGBTQ plays and their popularization. Even with the stigma around the LGBTQ community, especially with the rise of the AIDS epidemic, LGBTQ pride and media were becoming mainstream. Plays, TV shows, and films about LGBT-identifying people were becoming common in mainstream media. Popular musicals began to pop up throughout the 1980s and 1990s, the most famous being Rent, which came out in the 1990s. The musical is set in the early 1990s, and it centers around a group of New Yorkers, as they struggle with their careers, love lives, and the AIDS epidemic. The play was seen as groundbreaking, was performed over 5,000 times, and ran for 12 years. The legacy that Rent produced allowed for a range of LGBTQ productions to be performed across the world. Subsequent notable American LGBTQ musicals include Fun Home, The Prom, and A Strange Loop.

=== Legacy ===
The history of LGBTQ theatre has inspired many plays and musicals over the years. As the genre grew, playwrights and screenwriters cited the "classics" as references for their projects. A prominent play that has been cited as "influential" was one of the first, The Boys in the Band, which became prominent throughout the U.S. when it came out for being the "most frank description of being gay", and instantly received both praise and criticism. The play, for many, was cited as their first time being exposed to homosexuality. In 2018, in an article in The New York Times, people submitted stories about how they heard about The Boys in the Band, and how it affected them. The play was revived for its fiftieth anniversary in 2018 with a cast including Matt Bomer, Jim Parsons, and Zachary Quinto. The play's producer Ryan Murphy stated, "The guys that who are the leads, are the first generation of gay actors who said, 'We're going to live authentic lives and hope and pray our careers remain on track' — and they have. I find that profound." The play was revived with two other gay "classics", Angels in America and Torch Song Trilogy.

== LGBTQ theatre around the world ==
=== Background ===
LGBTQ theatre has become much more popular in the last century, including in North America, Asia, and Europe. However, this has not been without resistance, due to homophobia and other discrimination against the LGBTQ community. The presence, scope, and reception of LGBTQ theatre often depends on a country's or region's legal and cultural tolerance of the LGBTQ community.

=== Africa ===
LGBTQ theatre has emerged in African countries such as Cape Verde, Ghana, South Africa, and Tunisia.

==== South Africa ====
South African contemporary theatre has included a number of pieces involving LGBTQ characters and themes since at least the 1990s. Early LGBTQ theatre in South Africa aimed both to represent and resonate with LGBTQ audiences, and to educate straight audience on LGBTQ topics.

Johannesburg's Market Theatre has put on a number of LGBTQ theatre works. In 2023, it hosted the premiere of Vogue Opera, an opera based on the life of South African LGBTQ rights activist Simon Nkoli.

==== Tunisia ====
In 2022, Tunisia's first LGBTQ play, Flagranti, was staged in Tunis by the group Mawjoudin. In addition to the oppression and violence faced by LGBTQ Tunisians, the work also addresses "police and judicial corruption, impunity and...brain drain". At the time of Flagranti's premiere, same-sex sexual relations remained illegal in the country.

=== Asia ===
LGBTQ theatre is generally less prominent in Asia than on other continents.

==== South Asia ====
The tradition of men playing women's roles has a "long history" in the theatrical traditions of South Asia, being mentioned both in Patanjali's Mahabhashya and in the Natya Shastra . In contemporary tradition, female impersonation is still practiced in the dance/theatre forms of Kathakali (Kerala) and Ramlila (Uttar Pradesh), among others, but has "vanished from the urban cultural zone".

==== Taiwan ====
Within Taiwan, cultural conservatism continues to impact the LGBTQ community. However, since the lifting of martial law in the country, queer theater has become more popular. One notable figure in Taiwanese LGBTQ theatre is Lai Sheng-Chuan, a playwright who has both popularized LGBTQ theatre and criticized the government.

The first known queer theatre company in Taiwan was Maoshi, which was established in 1988 by Tian ChiYuan, who later died from AIDS. Tian used theatre to fight both homophobia and stigma against AIDS during times of extreme conservatism. Some of Tian's most known plays are adaptations of Whitewater and Legend of the white Snake, which were both centered around homoerotic love, a topic unseen in public during the 1990s. After Tian's death, people have continued to create adaptations of Whitewater because of its symbolism of queer trauma.

==== Turkey ====
From the 2010s to the 2020s, trans women have become more prominent in Turkey's alternative theatre spheres, both as creators of works and as subjects of works. However, beyond the smaller productions helmed by trans women, which are "characterized by themes of hope and resistance", theatrical representations of trans women have largely been produced by cisgender actors and creators, with a focus on "trans women's suffering", "often [ending] with the main character's death".

=== Europe ===
Like the U.S., Europe generally has a more progressive view on LGBTQ theatre and has been accepting of the LGBTQ community. In Europe, LGBTQ-related theatre dates back to the 6th century BC in Ancient Greece, when men played women's parts because women were not yet allowed to play such roles.

==== Estonia ====
Following an end to theatre censorship following the Singing Revolution and the country's independence in 1991, Estonian theatre began to explore formerly taboo themes of gender and sexuality, and "[embraced] LGBTQ+ themes, characters, and aesthetics".

==== United Kingdom ====
Some Shakespeare plays have been identified as having LGBTQ themes, such as As You Like It and Twelfth Night, both of which have female characters who crossdress as men and enter into flirtatious interactions with women.

In the UK, restrictions on LGBTQ theatre existed into the 20th century. The Lord Chamberlain was empowered by the Licensing Act 1737 to act as a theatrical censor, a power which was held by the office until 1968. However, some of those restrictions would later be lifted, and in the 21st century many LGBTQ plays have been performed.

British theatre companies with a specific focus on LGBTQ works include Above the Stag Theatre, Aputheatre, Gay Sweatshop, and Milk Presents.

=== North America ===
==== Canada ====
In the Canadian province of Quebec, LGBTQ playwrights in the 1980s and 1990s saw success in marketing gay and lesbian-related theatre to mixed audiences of both LGBTQ and straight people.

Canadian theatre companies with a specific focus on LGBTQ works include Buddies in Bad Times, and the Frank Theatre Company.

==== United States ====
LGBTQ theatre has been relatively well known in the U.S. for the past few decades. It has been around for longer than that but suffered from controversy. Some American LGBTQ shows include Rent, an adaptation of La bohème, which follows a group of friends during the AIDS crisis; and The Prom by Chad Beguelin, which follows a teenage girl trying to bring her girlfriend to the prom in a conservative town in Indiana. LGBTQ-related plays and musicals are present on Broadway, and they are also put on across the country in smaller regional and community venues. The U.S. is also home to some theatre companies that primarily focus on LGBTQ-related works, including Celebration Theatre, The Five Lesbian Brothers, Pomo Afro Homos, Split Britches, StageQ, The Theater Offensive, Theatre Rhinoceros, Triangle Productions, and the Triangle Theater Company.

=== Oceania ===
==== Australia ====
By the mid-1990s, the "divisions between gay and mainstream theatre" were "increasingly blurred" in Australia; however, academics noted that LGBTQ representation in Australian plays and musicals was largely limited to gay men.

Australian theatre companies with a specific focus on LGBTQ works include ActNow Theatre.

== Backlash to LGBTQ theatre ==
=== Background ===
LGBTQ theater has faced backlash from audiences and critics for over a century. The backlash against LGBTQ theater ranges from physical to financial threats and is a barrier that LGBTQ theater faces due to the nature of its content. This backlash is often because of what LGBTQ theater is about—showing the lives and stories of LGBTQ folks living their lives, in musicals such as Rent and plays such as Angels in America.

=== Financial and cancellation threats ===
Some of the backlash against LGBTQ theater involves the withdrawal of financial support or the canceling of the show itself. Financial threats are the most common in the LGBTQ theater and threaten many stages where LGBTQ performances can be held.

==== United States ====
In December 1935, authorities in Boston declared that the play The Children's Hour did not meet the standards of the Watch and Ward Society, due to its "lesbian content", and that it could not be performed in the following month as scheduled. Producer Herman Shumlin filed a $250,000 suit for damages with support from the ACLU, but in February 1936 a Federal judge refused to prevent the city from interfering in the presentation of the play. In January 1936, a municipal censorship ordinance was used to decline granting a performance permit for The Children's Hour in Chicago.

In March 1970, when the play The Boys in the Band was staged in the Black Box Theater at the Atlanta Memorial Arts Center, the Fulton County Commission threatened to cut public funding due to its portrayal of gay life, labeling it "filthy content". Nevertheless, the play continued to be staged for two weeks and would be staged again at Buckhead Theatre in 1976.

The 1996 premiere of Angels in America in Charlotte, North Carolina was threatened with cancellation due to protests from locals. This made the show more successful because more people gathered to see what the fuss was all about, selling out the tickets.

In the 2020s, the cancellation of shows has occurred most often with school plays, as a school administration may cancel shows due to their content. For example, in January 2023, Florida's Duval County Public Schools administrators stopped production of the play Indecent, which detailed a love affair between two women, due to its "mature content". In February 2023, Indiana's Northwest Allen County Schools canceled a production of the play Marian after adults protested its depiction of a same-sex couple and a non-binary character.

==== Russia ====
In November 2022, performances of a children's play at a theatre in the southern Russian city of Novosibirsk were canceled just days after local culture ministry authorities stated that they would investigate whether or not the performance violated anti-LGBTQ legislation set in place in 2013. Although the Siberian Theater announced that the play was canceled due to technical difficulties, the show's cancellation came only days after many posts emerged on social media asking for an investigation into whether the show broke the Russian laws banning the "promotion of non-traditional sexual relations with minors". The show was canceled just 20 minutes before the start, and while authorities declined to say whether the cancellation was due to the announced investigation, many believe that the cancellation was due to the relationship of two characters in the show where they act out a scene from The Princess and The Ogre as two men.

==== Hungary ====
In June 2018, the Hungarian State Opera canceled over a dozen performances of the musical Billy Elliot after a newspaper columnist accused the production of being "gay propaganda". A June 1 column by Zsofia N. Horvath in the conservative newspaper Magyar Idők claimed that the musical exposed young audience members to "unrestrained gay propaganda", and went "against the objectives of the state...in a situation where the population is already aging and decreasing". This caused 15 of the show's performances to be canceled.

== Notable LGBTQ theatre practitioners ==
Below is a collection of multiple notable LGBTQ actors, directors, and playwrights. It lists people from as far back as 1854 to more recent examples.

- One of the first and most notable LGBTQ playwrights was Oscar Fingal O'Flahertie Wills Wilde, or Oscar Wilde. Born October 16, 1854, in Dublin, Ireland, he is known for works such as The Importance of Being Earnest. Due to his homosexuality at that time, he was arrested and sent to prison.
- Tennessee Williams (1911–1983) was an openly gay American playwright. He wrote plays such as The Glass Menagerie, A Streetcar Named Desire, and Cat on a Hot Tin Roof. Alongside plays, Williams also wrote short stories, poetry, and some memoirs. He was inducted into the American Theater Hall of Fame.
- Edward Franklin Albee III was born March 12, 1928, and wrote many plays throughout his life, including The Goat, or Who Is Sylvia?, Three Tall Women, and Who's Afraid of Virginia Woolf? He was openly gay and never hid his homosexuality.
- Tony Kushner (born July 16, 1956) is an openly gay American playwright. He is best known for his work on Angels in America, which won a Pulitzer Prize and a Tony Award, he also received the National Medal of Arts from Barack Obama in 2013.
- Mart Crowley (born August 21, 1935) is an American playwright best known for his work on the play Boys in the Band, which had gay themes. Other works include Remote Asylum and A Breeze from the Gulf.
- John Waters (born April 22, 1946) is an openly gay American actor, playwright, and filmmaker. He has appeared in films such as Seed of Chucky and Suburban Gothic, but also wrote and directed the film Hairspray, which was later turned into a Broadway musical.
- Harvey Fierstein (born June 6, 1954) is an openly gay American actor and playwright. He is mostly known for his work with productions such as Hairspray and films such as Independence Day. He also wrote the book for the musical La Cage aux Folles and has won four Tony Awards for Best Actor in a Play, Best Play, Best Book of a Musical, and Best Actor in a Musical.

== Selected theatrical works with LGBTQ characters or themes ==
=== Musicals ===
- Bare: A Pop Opera by Jon Hartmere and Damon Intrabartolo
- Bare: The Musical by Jon Hartmere, Damon Intrabartolo, and Lynne Shankel
- Cabaret by Fred Ebb, John Kander, and Joe Masteroff
- La Cage Aux Folles by Harvey Fierstein and Jerry Herman
- The Color Purple by Stephen Bray, Marsha Norman, Brenda Russell, and Allee Willis
- Falsettos by William Finn and James Lapine
- Fun Home by Lisa Kron and Jeanine Tesori
- Hedwig and the Angry Inch by John Cameron Mitchell and Stephen Trask
- Kinky Boots by Harvey Fierstein and Cyndi Lauper
- Kiss of the Spider Woman by Fred Ebb, John Kander, and Terrence McNally
- Rent by Jonathan Larson
- Spring Awakening by Steven Sater and Duncan Sheik
- A Strange Loop by Michael R. Jackson
- The View UpStairs by Max Vernon

=== Plays ===
- Angels in America by Tony Kushner
- Bent by Martin Sherman
- The Boys in the Band by Mart Crowley
- Cat on a Hot Tin Roof by Tennessee Williams
- Corpus Christi by Terrence McNally
- The Laramie Project by Moisés Kaufman and members of the Tectonic Theater Project
- M. Butterfly by David Henry Hwang
- The Normal Heart by Larry Kramer
- Stop Kiss by Diana Son
- Torch Song Trilogy by Harvey Fierstein
- The Prince by Abigail Thorn

== See also ==
- Dublin Gay Theatre Festival
- List of LGBTQ theatre companies
- LGBTQ history
- Drag show
- Ball culture
