= The New Friend =

The New Friend may refer to:

- "The New Friend" (Frasier), a television episode
- "The New Friend" (Seinfeld) or "The Boyfriend", a television episode
- New Friend, a 1927 Singaporean silent film
- "New Friend", a song by No Doubt from Everything in Time

== See also ==
- New Friends, a jazz album
