= Seán Cummings =

- Occupations: Actor; director; producer; playwright
- Notable credit(s): Bent, Poor Super Man, Broken, Crossing, Falling In Time

Seán Cummings is a British/Canadian film and television industry professional and retired playwright, actor, producer, and director from Vancouver, British Columbia, Canada. He is a first generation Canadian of Scottish, Irish, and English descent.

Cummings' first full-length play, "Chasing Home" was produced at the Vancouver Playhouse by the Frank Theatre Company and the Vancouver Playhouse Theatre Company in Vancouver, British Columbia, in 2012. His first published work appears as the preface to C.E. Gatchalian's "Crossing" and other Plays - Lethe Press (Feb. 6 2011).

He is a founder of Meta for Theatre Company and served as co-artistic director from 2004 to 2008, later serving as artistic director of Frank Theatre Company from 2008 to 2012.

As a director, Cummings is known as the director of the stage versions of Lambda Literary Award nominee C. E. Gatchalian's plays Crossing, Broken and Falling In Time.

As an actor, his roles have included Jason in Take Me Out and Bertram in All's Well That Ends Well In late 2007, he delivered a critically acclaimed performance in the Vancouver production of Bent, a play about homosexuals in Germany under the Nazis. In early 2008, he played David in a revival of Brad Fraser's Poor Super Man.
