= Cyfer =

Cyfer is a surname. Notable people with the surname include:

- LoUis CYfer, stage name as drag king of Lucy Jane Parkinson
- Adrian Cyfer, Polish speedway rider in 2015 Individual Speedway Junior World Championship and other competitions
