= New Friend =

1927 film

New Friend (新客)
- Directed by: Kwok Chiu-man (郭超文)
- Produced by: Low Pui-kim (劉貝錦)
- Starring: Cheng Chao-jen (鄭超人 (鄭連捷)); Luk Chao-yuk (陸肖予); Wee Mong-may (黃夢梅)
- Cinematography: Kwok Chiu-man (郭超文)
- Release date: 29 April 1927
- Running time: 99 minutes
- Countries: Singapore; United Kingdom
- Languages: silent film with Chinese and English subtitles

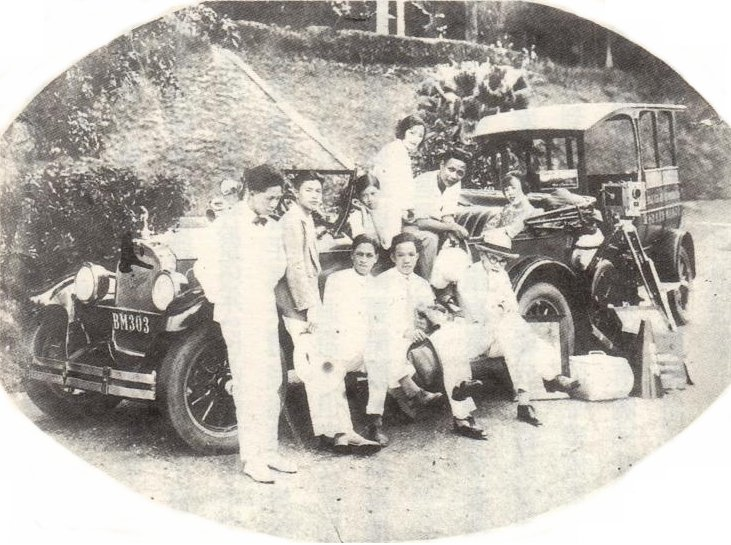
Still from the film.

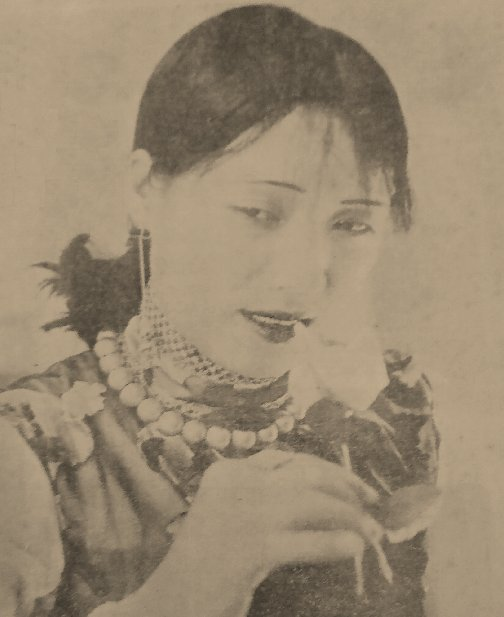
Singaporean actress Luk Chao-yuk (陸肖予), the heroine in the film.

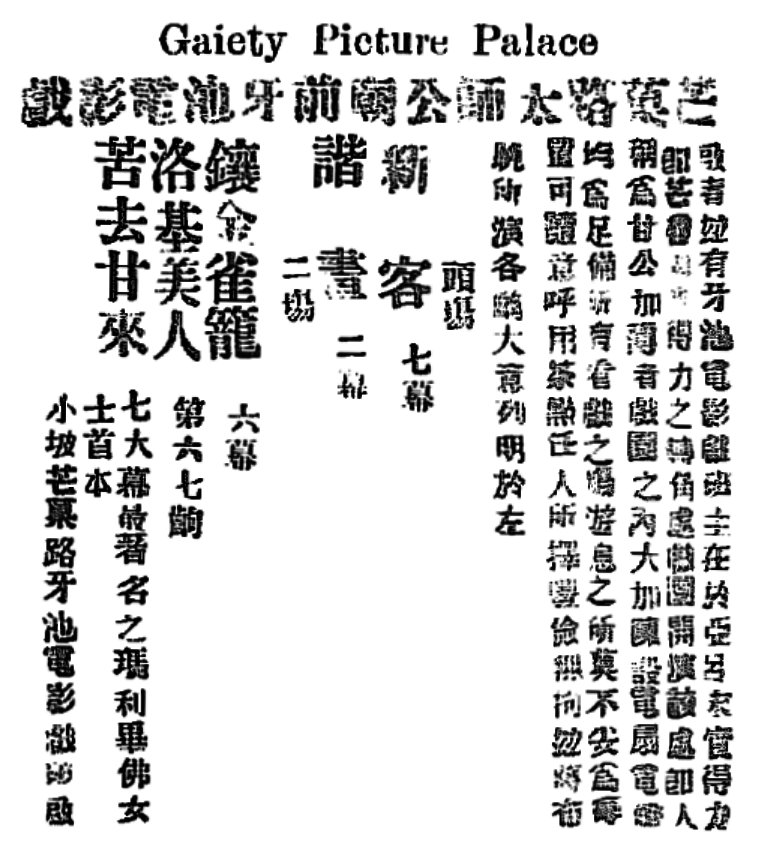
Advertisement for the film in the "Gaiety Picture Place" (牙池電影戲), a cinema that was located in front of a Chinese temple - "(太師公廟)", the junction between Albert Street (芒果律) and Bencoolen Street (小坡五馬路), Singapore.

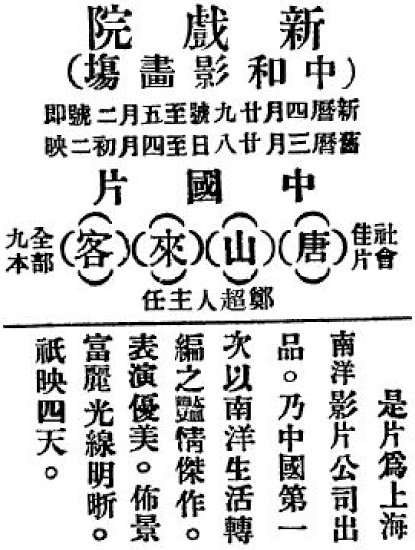
New Friend (新客)", also known as "(唐山來客)" in Chinese: advertisement for the film at "Chung Wo Cinema (中和影畫場)", a cinema that was located in Kau U Fong (九如坊), Central (中環), Hong Kong.

New Friend (Chinese: 新客; pinyin: Xin Ke; lit. 'The Immigrant') was the first Singaporean film shot entirely in Singapore and Malaya. It was produced by Nanyang Low Pui-kim's Self-made Motion Picture Company (南洋劉貝錦自製影片公司), in association with Low Pui-kim (劉貝錦, 1902 to 1959), who served as the producer and Kwok Chiu-man (郭超文), who was both the director and cinematographer. The film production company originally planned to produce its second film production, silent movie "(行不得也哥哥)", however, as the film production company was closed on 10 May 1927, this film is pending.

The silent film New Friend (新客) is a melodrama about a newly arrived Chinese immigrant to Singapore. It was first screened in Singapore at the Victoria Theatre (維多利亞戲院) on 4 March for a public test, entertained more than 500 guests, just showed 6 reels of film, two erotic dances (Chinese sword dance and Malay butterfly dancer) were also shown in the showed film. Its official premiere was at Marlborough Pub and Theatre (曼舞羅戲院) on Beach Road (小坡海墘十二間), and Gaiety Picture Place (牙池電影戲), the cinema was located in front of a Chinese temple - "(太師公廟)", the junction between Albert Street (芒果律) and Bencoolen Street (小坡五馬路), Singapore. After public showing in Singapore, it was reported that it used another Chinese film title as "(唐山來客)", released in the "Chung Wo Cinema (中和影畫場)" in Kau U Fong (九如坊), Hong Kong, from 29 April 1927, Friday to 2 May 1927, Monday, totally four days, so it is the first film production of Singapore, and the first export film production too.

== Synopsis ==
Sham Hwa-kueng (沈華強) is a poor orphan from the Republic of China who moves to Malaysia hoping for a better life. He stays at his rich uncle Tiew Tin-shek (張天錫)’s residence.

Tiew operated a rubber firm in Muar, Malaysia. His family is composed of his wife, Ngai (顏氏), eldest daughter Tiew Wai-ching (張慧貞) and a son Tan Ping-fan (陳炳勳).

Sham is appointed into the rubber firm as a trainee. Tiew 's children like to play tricks on Sham because he doesn't know Nanyang custom.

Meanwhile, the English clerk Kim Fook-sing (甘福勝), the antagonist, is making trouble. He wants to marry Tiew's daughter for Tiew's family wealth. However, she prefers Sham.

One day, Kim finds Wai-ching playing the piano in the sitting room, harmonizing with Sham's Chinese flute. Kim becomes angry because of this, and decides to play a trick on Sham, so he tries to force him to resign his post, and move to Singapore. Wai-ching realizes that Kim is a playboy and hooligan, so she goes to Singapore, and studies in a girls high school with her local friend Low Kit-yuk (劉潔玉). Low falls in love with Sham.

Kim successfully persuades Tiew to let him marry Wai-ching. She refuses her dad's decision, and escapes into the jungle, where Kim catches her with the help of his hooligan friend Chao Ping (趙丙). Sham enters the jungle to save her and fights a python and crocodile for her.

Eventually, Sham fought Kim and Chao and defeated them. In an attempt to escape but they end up driving off a cliff. Wai-ching marries Sham Hwa-kueng in the end.

=== Erotic dances in the film ===
The film contains two erotic dances:

- 17 years old Shanghai sexy actress Chen Meng-ju (陳夢如) wore ancient Chinese dress to perform Chinese sword dance. Taiwanese scholars believe that she is the principal actor Cheng Chao-jen (鄭超人)'s real wife, Chou Tsing Hwa (周清華);
- Singapore Cantonese actress Wee Mong-may (黃夢梅); she was dishevelled, and showed off her neck and arms, performed Malay style butterfly dance.

== Cast ==
- Cheng Chao-jen (鄭超人 (鄭連捷)) as a new immigrant Sham Hwa-kueng (沈華強) who is a poor orphan from Republic of China;
- Tan Chee-eng (陳子纓) as Tiew Tin-shek (張天錫), the owner of the "Sin Teik Seng (新德成) rubber firm" in Malaya, and the father of two children: unruly Tiew Wai-ching (張慧貞) and naughty son Tiew Sinh-min (張新民);
- Wo Ying (我影) as Er (余氏), she is Tiew Tin-shek (張天錫)’s wife, the parent of two children, unruly Tiew Wai-ching (張慧貞) and naughty Tiew Sinh-min (張新民);
- Luk Chao-yuk (陸肖予) as Tiew Wai-ching (張慧貞);
- child actor Tan Ping-fan (陳炳勳) as Tiew Sinh-min (張新民), a naughty prepubescent child;
- Wan Tuan-nam (雲端南) as Low Pak-tin (劉伯憩), the owner of "Chun Yuan (春源) rubber plantation" in Singapore;
- Wan Cheng (晚成) as Ngai (顏氏), Low Pak-tin (劉伯憩)’s wife, they have an only daughter Low Kit-yuk (劉潔玉);
- Wee Mong-may (黃夢梅) as Low Kit-yuk (劉潔玉), she is Low Pak-tin (劉伯憩)’s daughter, she performed a provocative Malay dance with disheveled hair and naked elbows;
- Tam Min-hing (譚民興) as native hooligan Kim Fook-sing (甘福勝), he is an English clerk of Tiew Tin-shek (張天錫)’s rubber firm;
- I Chih (一癡) as Chao (甘趙氏) as Kim Fook-sing (甘福勝)’s mother;
- Hong Siu-pak (康笑伯) as Hong Tsz-ming (康子明), he is the Chinese clerk of Tiew Tin-shek (張天錫)’s rubber firm;
- Hsiao Chien (笑倩) as prostitute Yuk-kuen (玉娟), an abandoned sexual partner of Kim Fook-sing (甘福勝);
- Fong Chee-tam (方之談) as Chao Ping (趙丙), a known hooligan who is also good friends with Kim Fook-sing (甘福勝);
- Tan Chong-eng (陳崇榮) as an old farmer Chew Ah (周勤);
- Chen Meng-ju (陳夢如) as a social butterfly Hua Ai-hung (華愛儂), she performed a swords dance with an ancient costume in the film;
- Chew Chee-peng (周志平) as guest A.
- Tiew Cheng-hwa (張清華) as guest B.
