= Marlborough Pub and Theatre =

Pub theatre in Brighton, England

Coordinates: 50°49′20″N 0°08′09″W

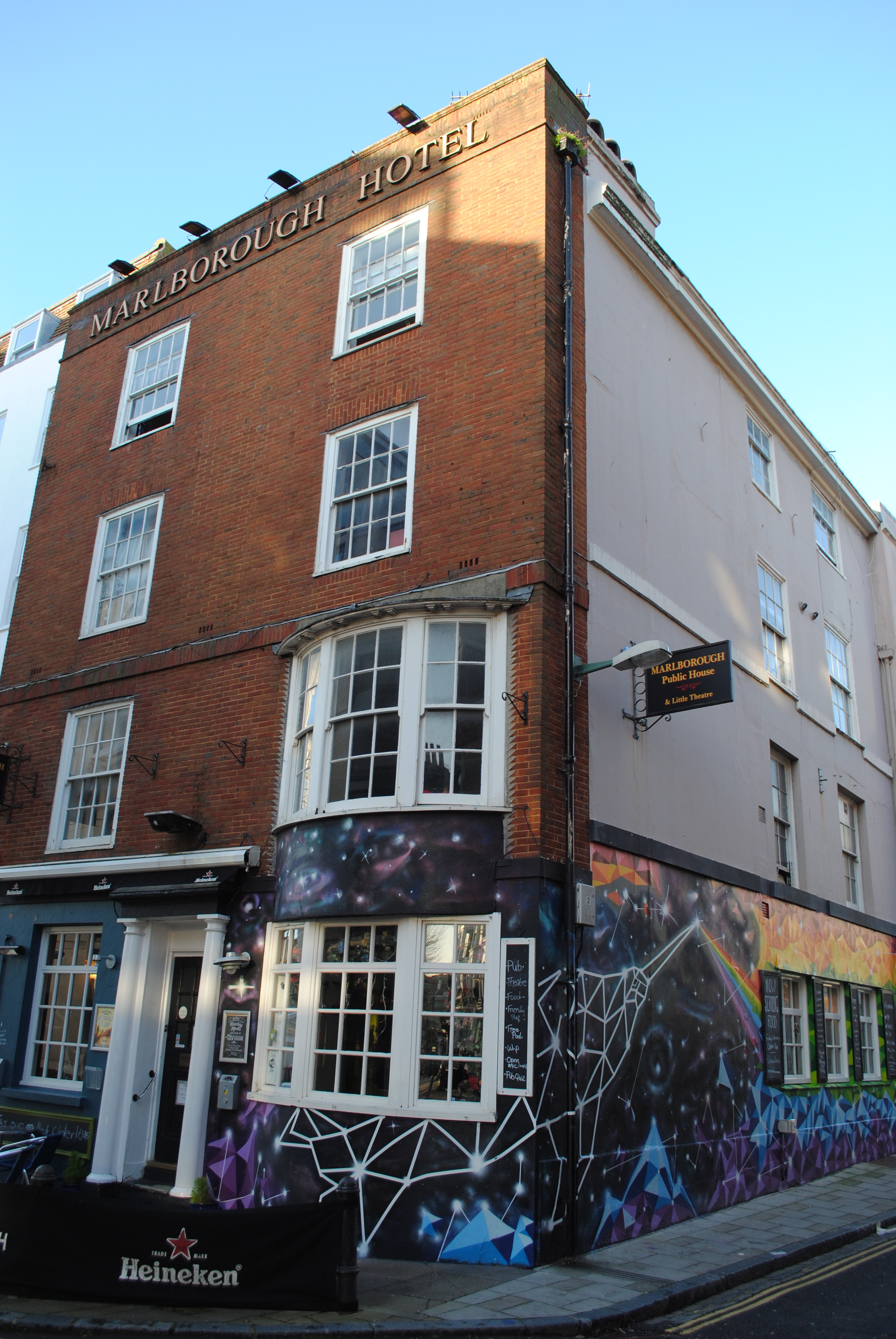
The Marlborough in January 2015

The Marlborough Pub and Theatre is a historic venue, situated at 4 Princes Street, Brighton. It has been associated, since the 1970s, with the LGBT community. The Marlborough's small theatre presents drama, cabaret and music throughout the year, including during the Brighton Fringe Festival, LGBT History Month and Brighton Pride Arts Festival. The pub reopened in 2021 as 'The Actors'.

== Early history ==
The Marlborough was built in 1787 as an inn called the Golden Cross. The cellar has a bricked-up passageway which, it is rumoured, provided a direct link between the inn and Royal Pavilion (left). According to Brighton lore, this was used by George, Prince of Wales to make discreet visits, either to a brothel or a theatre in the inn.

In the early 1820s, the inn was owned by James Ireland, a prosperous local woollen-draper and undertaker. Ireland also owned land on the Level where, on 1 May 1823, he opened his 'Royal Gardens' to the public. The pleasure gardens including a ladies' bowling-green, an aviary, an ornamental grotto, a maze, and a small lake. Despite numerous attractions and special events, Ireland's Gardens were not a financial success and he sold them in December 1826.

During James Ireland's tenure, the Brighton Royal Catch & Glee Club, a popular subscription music society, met at the Golden Cross every Tuesday evening.

Ireland was succeeded at the Golden Cross by Robert Ellis and then, in the 1840s, by the brothers James and William Creech. In 1849, James Creech got into financial difficulties and, after borrowing money against the contents of the pub, all the property's goods were seized and sold by the Sheriff of Sussex to pay Creech's creditors. Thanks to the subsequent debt collector's record, we have a detailed description of the inn's interior and furnishings in 1849. The 20-room inn offered drink, food, lodgings and recreations to gentlemen of comfortable means. On the top floor were four bedrooms, furnished with Japanned (black lacquered) and mahogany bedsteads, dressing tables, wash stands and chests of drawers; white dimity, leather-covered armchairs; and Kidderminster or Brussels carpets. On the second floor were three slightly bigger rooms, with four-poster beds. On the first floor were four comfortable sitting rooms, with open fires, velvet-covered oak chairs and mahogany tables. The third sitting room had a piano in a mahogany case. The first floor also had a ballroom (where the current theatre is). Its fittings included a mahogany board for the game of Racehorse Balls and 20 brown ware spittoons. The ground floor featured the bar, plus a parlour (with 20 iron spittoons) and a coffee room, with a writing desk. The bar featured an 18 x 3 ft counter and a spirit fountain with eight brass taps. The kitchen was well equipped, with numerous pans, fish steamers and a five-foot kitchen range.

With the selling off of the fixtures and fittings, the building's life as a fashionable inn came to an end. It was now a typical Victorian pub, renamed the Marlborough Tavern (later Hotel) around 1850. From the 1860s, the landlord was Thomas Packham. His son, also Thomas, succeeded him in 1885.

== Murder at the Marlborough ==
In 1900, the Marlborough was the setting for a murder case, when Lucy Packham, wife of the landlord, was found dead and badly battered at the foot of the stairs. Her husband Thomas was arrested and tried for murder. At the trial, a policeman, PC Puttick, testified that, while in the street outside the pub on the day of the killing, he had heard Packham say to his wife, 'You're a lazy woman. You ought to be killed. I will kill you'. Despite this evidence, the all-male jury found Packham guilty only of manslaughter, sentencing him to just four years in prison. In 1979, the crime was re-enacted in the pub with a comic play, Murder at the Marlborough, by John Montgomery, starring Binky Baker. During the play, the audience watched the murder in the bar, and the trial in the theatre upstairs. According to John Rackham, the first performance was disrupted by a woman customer, who was unaware that a play was in progress:

On seeing the 'victim' crash to the floor after being 'hit' by a bottle, she burst into hysterical screams. Hardly had she been pacified with a hissed revelation of the truth when a new customer arrived at the pub. Surprised to see such a crush of people in the bar, he failed to notice the 'victim' still laid out on the floor, and promptly tumbled over her, to appreciative applause from those watching!

'One Day in a Summer in a Garden', another play starring Binky Baker (left), at the Marlborough Theatre in May 1983

== Ghost stories ==
Over the years, bar staff at the Marlborough have described poltergeist-like activities in the pub, which they blame on Lucy Packham's ghost. Eddie Scannell, landlord in the 1970s, recalled, 'It was around 1976 and soon after evening closing time. the bar staff had gone home and I'd locked all the doors and cleared up the bar. Suddenly the temperature dropped and there was a cold draught. The next moment I felt something invisible brush past me. I was shocked enough to leave the rest of the bar work until the following morning!'. In 2000, manager Sue Kerslake described witnessing lights going on and off, the switching off the gas on beer taps and the shattering of a row of bottles, swept off a shelf behind the bar. The pub was a major location on Brighton ghost walks.

== Sussex Gay Liberation Front ==
The pub's links with Brighton's LGBT community date from the 1970s. Sussex GLF (Gay Liberation Front), formed in February 1971 by Sussex University students, started to have regular meetings on Tuesdays at the Marlborough from early 1974, and discos were held fortnightly on Fridays. They held other events too, including a 1974 screening of a BBC documentary about gay Christians, The Lord is my Shepherd and He Knows I'm Gay. After Sussex GLF, came Brighton CHE (Campaign for Homosexual Equality) which took the Tuesday meeting slot from 1976 until 1981. In the 1970s, the pub was also being used for regular events for the local branch of the right wing National Front.

== The Marlborough Theatre ==
The pub theatre, with a capacity of 50–60, dates from a refurbishment in the 1970s, with the building of a stage with a proscenium arch. There was a second refurbishment in 1988, with the addition of thick velvet curtains. On 4 March 1988, the venue re-opened as the New Marlborough Theatre.

=== Siren Theatre Company ===
In 1979, Jude Winter, Tasha Fairbanks, Jane Boston and Deb Trethewy — previously members of Brighton-based bands The Devil's Dykes and The Bright Girls — formed the radical lesbian feminist theatre collective, Siren. Siren's shows included Curfew, Mama's Gone a-Hunting, From The Divine…, Now Wash Your Hands, Pulp and Hotel Destiny. The company made their debut at the Marlborough and toured extensively until disbanding in 1989. They also released two albums, Siren Plays and In Queer Street. Siren reformed in 2014, announcing plans to perform again at the Marlborough.

The content of Siren's work relates very explicitly to the position of women in our society: how women occupy different social positions according to our class, disabilities, race, creed and sexuality, and how struggles can be waged from these various points against the institutions of oppression. Having said this, we utterly refuse to be hived into the ghettoized category of 'women's theatre'....The questions we raise and the concepts we challenge have universal impact.

=== John Roman Baker and Aids Positive Underground ===
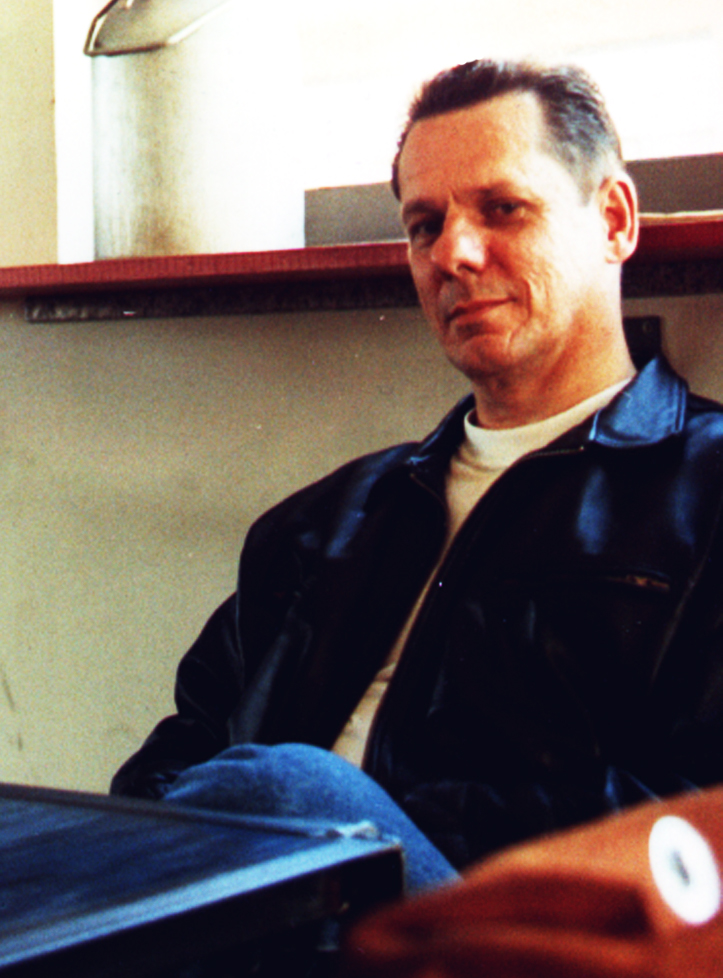
John Roman Baker

Another company linked with the Marlborough was Aids Positive Underground Theatre (later known as Aputheatre) which performed the In-yer-face theatre plays of John Roman Baker. The subject of these works was the impact of HIV and AIDS on gay men at the height of the crisis. The company's first play, Crying Celibate Tears, was such a success with critics and public in the 1989 Brighton Fringe Festival that they were selected to be part of the main Brighton Festival in 1990 with two shows, The Ice Pick and Stretching Frontiers. The first, which premiered at the Marlborough in May 1990, was described in the festival brochure as 'the second of a trilogy in which the profoundest commitment of men to each other is essential to their survival. Michael is HIV positive. Peter chooses not to know. Note: This production contains scenes which may offend.''. Despite causing controversy, the play still won the festival's 'Best Theatre' award. Stretching Frontiers was an 'entertainment devised around travel and risk by John Roman Baker, with music by Michael Finnissy', also staged at the Marlborough.

The Crying Celibate Tears trilogy was completed in 1991 with Freedom to Party, staged yet again at the Marlborough as part of the main Brighton Festival. This final play is set in an imagined future after a cure has wiped HIV from gay collective memory. 'The freedom to party, and to forget, has returned. But what of the survivors and the rejected?'

=== Best LGBT Bar None Award ===
From 1997, the Marlborough, now a lesbian pub, was run by Sue Kerslake and Bernadette Moss. Kath Lawson was manager in October 2006, when the Marlborough won the 'Best Bar None' award for best LGBT Venue, sponsored by Pink News and 3Sixty magazine. Lesbian and gay venues that entered were assessed on a variety of aspects of the business, including public safety, the prevention of crime and disorder and protecting children from harm.

From 2003 to 2005, the theatre was run separately from the pub, by Ros Barber and Paul Stones, who programmed a wide variety of theatre and comedy. It was then managed by Nicola Haydn and Eden Rivers (Otherplace Productions), who moved on, in 2009, to programme theatre in other Brighton venues.

=== The Maydays ===
In 2004, the improvised comedy troupe, The Maydays, made its debut at the Marlborough. Rebecca McMillan of the Maydays later recalled the show for Sussex Life magazine:

We did our very first performance here at the Marlborough in 2004. It went brilliantly. I'll never forget the feeling of getting my first laugh – I got bitten by the bug. Performing at the Marlborough always feels like coming home, it's got such a cosiness, intimacy and friendliness...It has a real old world charm – the plush curtains, the raised stage – things that so many small venues don't have.

=== Marlborough Productions ===
From 2008, the theatre was run by Marlborough Productions, a not-for-profit community interest company led by David Sheppeard, Tarik Elmoutawakil and Abby Butcher. In 2009, they also took over the management of the pub.

Between 2008 and 2020, Marlborough Productions supported hundreds of LGBTQ+ artists, including Sh!t Theatre, Travis Alabanza, Emma Frankland, Lucy McCormick, Harry Clayton-Wright, Lucy Hutson and Rachael Young. International and established artists who appeared at the theatre included Justin Vivian Bond, Big Freedia, Mykki Blanco, Bette Bourne, David Hoyle, Le Gateau Chocolat, Scottee, KUCHENGA, Lorraine Bowen, Ridiculusmus, Liz Aggiss and Kate Bornstein.

In 2010, Bella Todd, writing in The Guardian, welcomed the theatre's new direction: 'A great opening programme of new performance art and theatre includes the debut of The Marlborough Madams, a new lesbian company formed in the guise and spirit – and under the wing – of the famous Drill Hall Darlings. It also sees increasing activity from Neil Bartlett in his home city. His gender-bending Brighton festival cabaret The Girl I Left Behind Me is preceded by his appearance at Pink fringe alongside Bette Bourne. It's all taking place at the Marlborough theatre, a volunteer-run venue above a well-established lesbian pub, one of the early meeting places of the modern gay rights movement in Sussex.'

In 2016, the pub hosted the first ever Museum of Transology, showcasing artefacts collected by E-J Scott, 'as a form of curatorial direct action designed to halt the erasure of transcestry.' The expanded collection was later exhibited in Brighton Museum, whose website declared, 'This bold, brave and profound collection of artefacts and photographic portraiture began with donations from Brighton's vibrant trans community. It is now the largest collection representing trans people in the UK – if not the world.'

In 2018, the company launched a crowdfunding campaign to raise £10,000 to replace 'decrepit equipment including a broken air conditioning system, vintage sound and lighting and “viciously uncomfortable” seats.' The campaign raised £11,208 from 323 supporters in 56 days.

In July 2020, Marlborough Productions announced that they had ceased management of the pub and theatre, but would continue to present performances, parties and community gatherings at other spaces across Brighton and Hove.

== The Actors ==
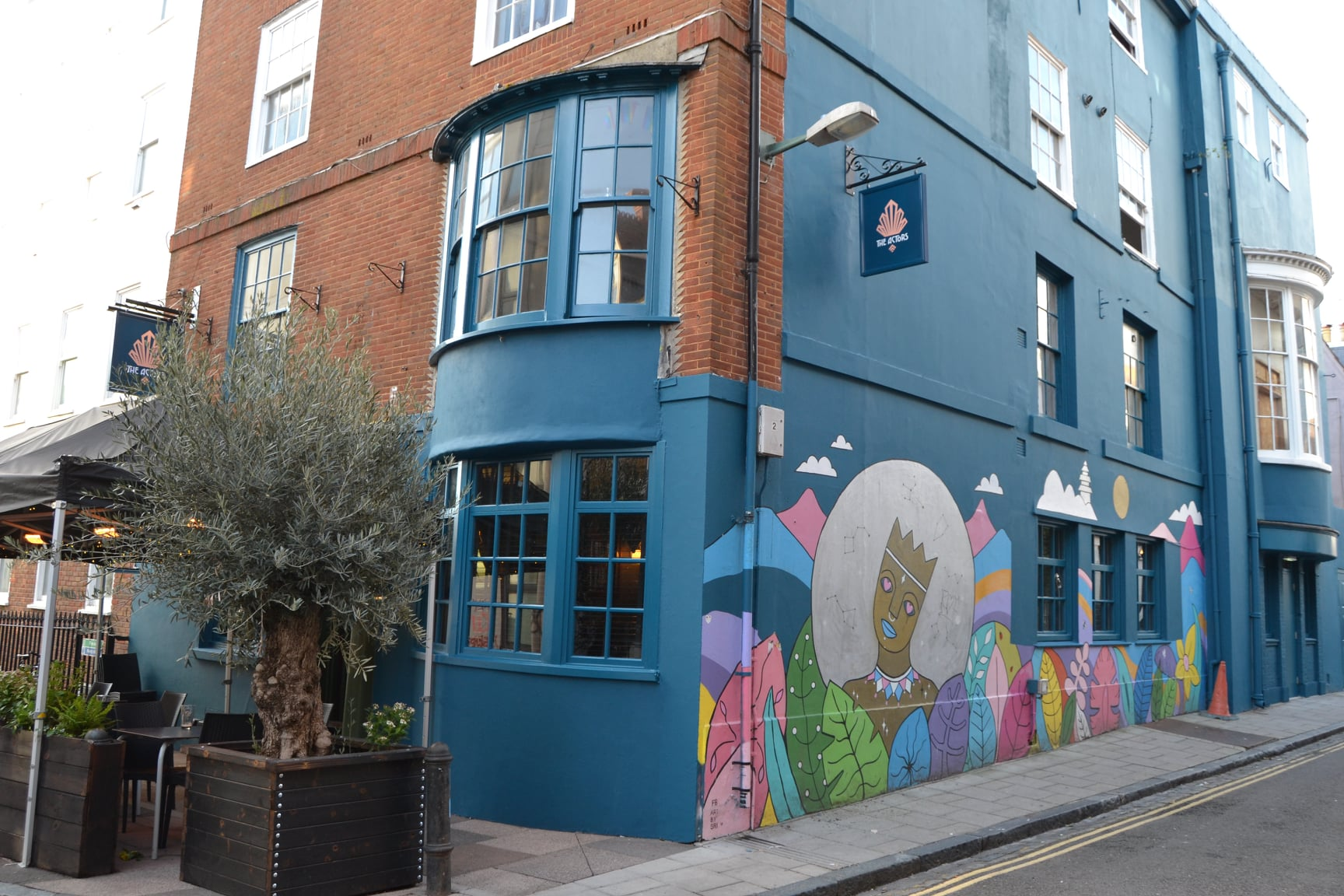
Exterior of 'The Actors' following refurbishment and renaming, October 2021

Following a period of closure throughout the COVID-19 pandemic; the pub was refurbished, renamed 'The Actors', and reopened in October 2021 by Brighton's Laine PubCo. The theatre space reopened in mid-2022.

In November 2026 the pub's management announced via Instagram that they would be closing in January 2027, as Laine PubCo had decided not to renew the lease on the building.
