= Shannon Jackson =

American professor and author

Shannon Jackson is the Cyrus and Michelle Hadidi Professor of Rhetoric and of Theater, Dance and Performance Studies at the University of California, Berkeley, Department Chair of History of Art, and former Associate Vice Chancellor of the Arts and Design. She also serves as Program Director of the Kramlich Collection and Kramlich Art Foundation.

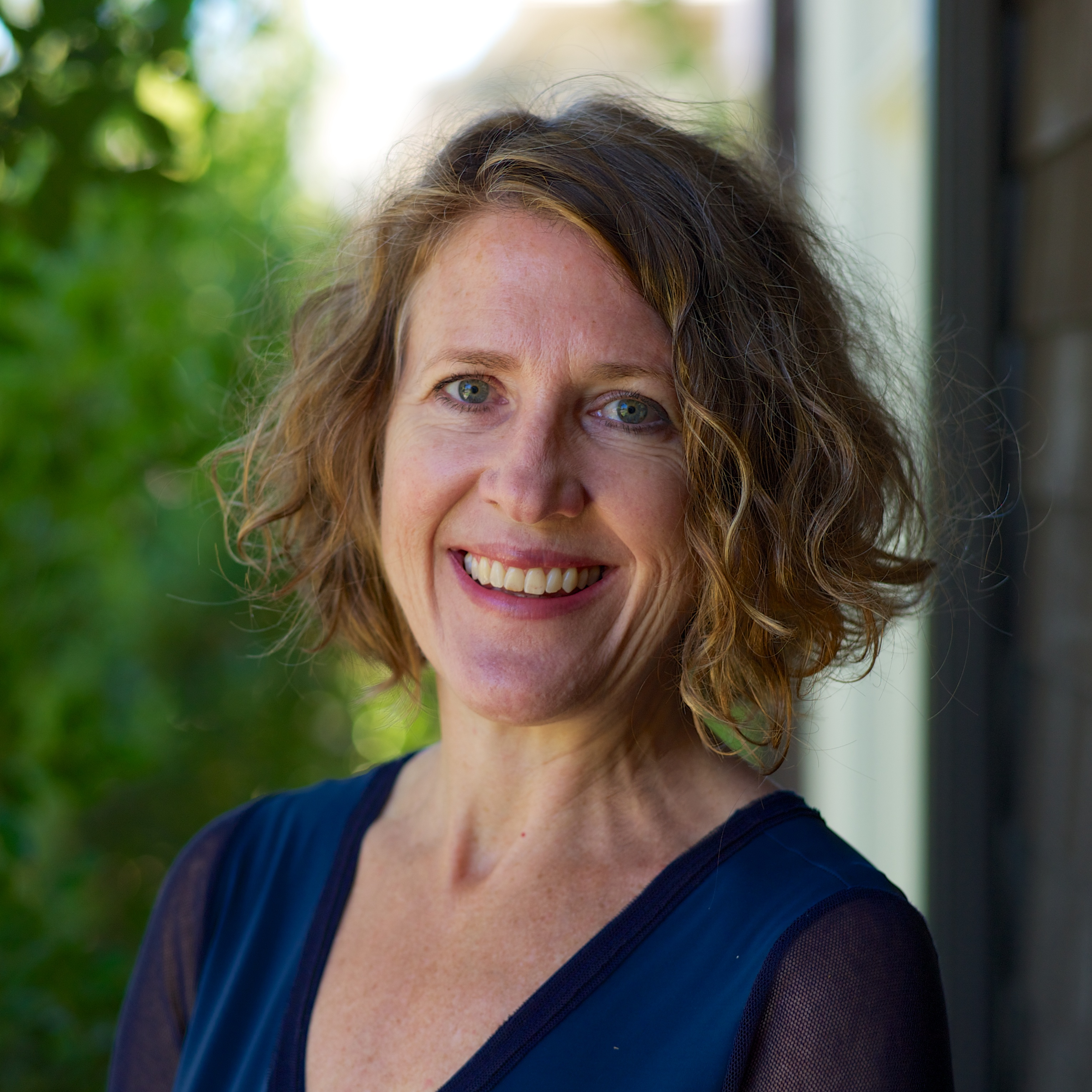

== Career ==
Her main academic areas of interest are performance studies, 20th century art, critical theory, questions of artistic labor, interdisciplinary collaboration, history and theory of theater and performance art. Her most recent books are Back Stages: Essays on Art, Performance and Public Life as well as The Human Condition: Media Art from the Kramlich Collection. Her publications include Lines of Activity: Performance, Historiography, Hull-House Domesticity, published by Michigan University Press in 2001, Professing Performance: Theatre in the Academy from Philology to Performativity, published by Cambridge University Press in 2004, Social Works: Performing Art, Supporting Publics, published by Routledge in 2011. With Marianne Weems she co-authored The Builders Association: Media and Performance in Contemporary Theater, published by MIT Press in 2015. Jackson has guest-edited an issue of the journal Art Practical, "Valuing Labor in the Arts," as well as an issue of Representations, "Time Zones: Durational Art and Its Contexts" with Julia Bryan-Wilson.

In 2014 Jackson was awarded a Guggenheim Fellowship. She was the recipient of the University of California, Berkeley Distinguished Service Award, Division of Arts and Humanities in 2011. Her other awards include the Lilla A. Heston Award for Outstanding Scholarship in Interpretation and Performance Studies in 2005, the ATHE Outstanding Book Award, and an Honorable Mention for the 2002 John Hope Franklin Prize of the American Studies Association.

Jackson is a trustee and advisor of several organizations, including Oakland Museum of California, BAMPFA, the Headlands Center for the Arts, as well as a former Cultural Commissioner for the City of Berkeley.

== Early life ==
Shannon Jackson is the adopted daughter of Robert Jackson and Jacqueline Oliveri Jackson, alumni of the University of California, Berkeley who raised her in California, Minnesota, and Illinois. The Oliveri and Jackson families were early investors in California real estate, and Robert Jackson was a managing executive for Coldwell Banker. Shannon Jackson earned a bachelor's degree from Stanford University and a doctorate from Northwestern University. Jackson was married to Michael Korcuska (1990 to 2020) and has two grown children. She was an assistant professor at Harvard University from 1995 to 1998, before moving the University of California, Berkeley.
