= Milk Presents (theatre company) =

English LGBTQIA+ theatre company

Milk Presents is an LGBTQIA+ theatre company based in Derby, United Kingdom.

== Company ==
The theatre company is an associate company of Derby Theatre and the Bush Theatre. In addition to producing theatrical works, the company also creates films, audio-plays, and photography, and organizes community residencies, workshops, club nights, symposiums, book groups, etc. Milk Presents tours its productions both nationally and globally.

== History ==
Milk Presents was founded in 2010 by Leo Skilbeck, Ruby Glaskin, and Adam Robertson after they graduated from the Royal Central School of Speech and Drama.

== Productions ==
The company's very first theatre show was 454 Grams in 2010, a postdramatic retelling of Shakespeare’s play The Merchant of Venice. Next, the company became an associate company of The Point in Eastleigh in 2011 and produced its first full-length shows: Bluebeard: A Fairytale for Adults and A Real Man’s Guide To Sainthood. Bluebeard: A Fairytale for Adults was based on Charles Perrault’s French folktale Bluebeard. A Real Man’s Guide To Sainthood was powered by bikes and used projectors, and was a retelling of the story of Saint George.

It then produced Milk Presents: Self Service (2013 - 2014), which explored the meaning of "queer" with original music, animations, and comedy. The company then became an associate company of Derby Theatre in 2015. At Derby Theatre, the company produced JOAN and BULLISH. JOAN portrayed the story of Joan of Arc and was performed by LJ Parkinson. It was directed and written by Lucy J. Skilbeck. BULLISH was a retelling of the Minotaur myth. It was launched at the Camden People’s Theatre, who commissioned the production alongside the Jerwood Charitable Foundation. Formerly named BODIY, BULLISH was the Camden People's Theatre's first Home Run commission after an extensive period of selection process.

Milk Presents then became an associate company of the Bush Theatre (2016-17). Around the same time in April 2017, the company was commissioned to host a "Bromance Cabaret" at the Wellcome Collection as part of their "Macho?" late-night event.

In August 2021, Milk Presents and Derby Theatre premiered co-production Marty and the Party, a show for young audiences.

In December 2021, in partnership with Derby Theatre, the company launched a new audio cabaret, The Pervert’s Podcast. This audio cabaret is presented by Milk Presents and co-produced by She Wants A Dog, a production company formed by a partnership between arts producers Pippa Frith and Kate Chapman that was focused on commissioning artists and producing creative work for podcasts.

In 2023, Milk Presents co-produced Modest with theatre company Middle Child.

== Awards ==
The theatre company's production JOAN won the Scotsman Fringe First Award, The Stage Award, and Spirit of the Fringe Award at the 2016 Edinburgh Festival Fringe. The production received the 2018 Offie.

== Summer Summit ==
Milk Presents also organizes Summer Summit, a paid weekend-long retreat for early-career LGBTQIA+ artists.
