= Marianne Weems =

New York artistic director

- Born: Washington state
- Occupations: Artistic director of The Builders Association; Professor at UC Santa Cruz

Marianne Weems is the artistic director of the New York-based Obie Award-winning performance and media company, The Builders Association, founded in 1994. She is a director of theater and opera and a professor at UC Santa Cruz.

== Early life and early career ==
Weems was born in Washington state and grew up in Seattle. She attended Reed College before graduating from Barnard College. In 1986–87 she attended Whitney Museum of American Art's Independent Study Program where she founded the performance and study group The V-Girls along with Martha Baer, Erin Cramer, Jessica Chalmers and Andrea Fraser. From 1988 to 1993 she was dramaturg and assistant director with The Wooster Group and during that time also worked with Susan Sontag, Ron Vawter, Richard Foreman and many others. From 1986 to 1989 she was program director for the independent arts foundation Art Matters, where she remains a member of the Board.

== Career ==
In 1994 Weems founded the performance and media ensemble The Builders Association with Dan Dobson, David Pence, John Cleater, Jennifer Tipton, and Jeff Webster; Moe Angelos and James Gibbs joined the company in 1998 and 1999 respectively. The Builders Association's first production was an adaptation of Ibsen's The Master Builder, set in a full-scale three story house constructed inside a New York City warehouse. Since then company has been recognized internationally as a leader in theatrical innovation for their interdisciplinary stage performances and use of digital technology. Collaborating with architects, sound, and video artists, software designers, and performers, Weems and The Builders Association combine video, text, sound, and architecture to explore the interface between media and live performance in a culture that is, as Weems puts it, "irrevocably mediatised." The company's last four productions have received their New York premieres at the Brooklyn Academy of Music; their work has been presented at New York Theatre Workshop, the Lincoln Center Festival, the Public Theater, the Singapore Arts Festival, London's Barbican Centre, Romaeuropa Festival, the Festival Iberoamericano de Teatro de Bogota, the Wexner Center, the Walker Center for the Arts, and the Melbourne International Arts Festival—the company has toured to over 80 international venues.

Weems has been an adjunct, lecturer, and visiting artist at Princeton University’s Lewis Center for the Arts, Columbia University, New York University, UC Berkeley, Ohio State University in Columbus, the University of Illinois, Urbana-Champaign, and many other institutions. From 2008 to 2014 she was the head of graduate directing at Carnegie Mellon University’s School of Drama and is now professor in the Theater Arts program at UC Santa Cruz. She is the co-author of Art Matters: How The Culture Wars Changed America (NYU Press, 2001) and recently co-wrote a book with Professor Shannon Jackson The Builders Association: Performance and Media in Contemporary Theater,(MIT Press 2015.)

== Personal life ==
She divides her time between San Francisco, CA and New York City with her daughter Sunita.

== Productions with the Builders Association ==
- Master Builder (1994)
- The White Album (1995)
- Imperial Motel (Faust) (1996)
- Jump-Cut (Faust) (1997–98)
- Jet Lag (1998–2001)
- Xtravaganza (2000–02)
- Alladeen (2002–05)
- Avanti (2003–05)
- Supervision (2005–06)
- Invisible Cities (2005–07)
- Continuous City (2007–10)
- Jet Lag 2010 (2010)
- House/Divided (2012)
- Sontag:Reborn (2013)
- Émilie (2014)
- ‘’Elements of Oz" (2016)
- ‘’Strange Window: Turn of the Screw" (2018)
