= Moe Angelos =

American playwright, and performer

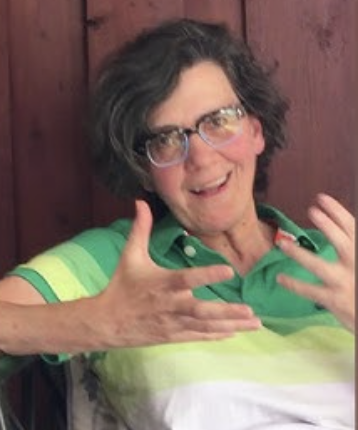
Angelos in 2020

Maureen "Moe" Angelos is an American theater artist, playwright, and performer known for her work in theater and her contributions to collaborative performance art. She is a member of the Obie Award-winning theatre company The Builders Association and a co-founder of the Obie Award-winning company, The Five Lesbian Brothers.

== Early career and WOW Café Theater ==
Angelos began her theater career in the early 1980s, joining the WOW Café Theatre in 1981. WOW Café is a feminist theater collective in New York City known for fostering avant-garde and experimental performances. Angelos continues to be an active member of the WOW community.

== The Five Lesbian Brothers ==
In 1988, Angelos co-founded The Five Lesbian Brothers, the Obie Award winning theater company that created works exploring feminist and queer themes. The group has written and performed six plays, including The Secretaries, Oedipus at Palm Springs, and Brave Smiles... Another Lesbian Tragedy, two of which were staged at the New York Theatre Workshop. Their innovative approach to storytelling earned them an Obie Award for their significant contributions to theater. The Brothers members include Babs Davy, Dominique Dibbell, Peg Healey, and Lisa Kron. In 1997 their book, The Five Lesbian Brothers' Guide to Life: A Collection of Helpful Hints and Fabricated Facts for Today's Gay Girl, was published by Simon & Schuster.

== The Builders Association ==
Angelos has been a core member of The Builders Association, a New York City-based theater company, since 2000. Known for integrating media and technology into live performance, Angelos has contributed as both a writer and performer to many of the Builders' critically acclaimed productions, including Sontag: Reborn for which she wrote and performed "a spellbinding X-ray of a writer’s psyche," a theatrical adaptation of Susan Sontag's early journals to trace Sontag's private life from the age of 14 to her emergence as an author and activist. Elements of Oz is a mash-up of performance, tech, and pop culture that moves through the landscapes of Oz from the surreal novel, to dark conspiracy theories, to the making of the iconic film, in which she plays the equally iconic Glinda. Angelos' work with The Builders Association company has toured in the US and abroad .

== Ongoing career ==
Angelos has worked with Toronto-based FADO Performance Art Centre, creating Book Club performances in 2019, blending literature and live art. In 2019 she presented "This Used to Be Gay!: The Moe Angelos East Village Walking Tour" at Queer|Art that offers live memoir of the "gay-borhood's" many changes over the years.

Collaborating with Canadian visual artist Hazel Meyer, Angelos performed in projects such as Weeping Concrete (2022) and The Marble in the Basement. In a collaboration with Rachel Hauck, she co-created "Guzzle 'n' Puzzle" at the 2023 Rhubarb Festival at Buddies in Bad Times Theatre, an interactive lounge inviting audiences into an experience with multi-disciplinary artist Melissa Levin's infamous puzzle collection.

In film, Angelos stars in Landfill (2024) portraying Alice, an elder butch dyke navigating terminal illness and legacy. Written and directed by Jess Lee, Landfill is based on Anna Leventhal's short story, "Sweet Affliction".
