= Museum of Transology =

Collection of transgender artefacts

Coordinates: 51°31′7.28″N 0°4′45.54″W

The logo for the collection, in the shape of the brown swing tags used in its exhibitions.

The Museum of Transology (MoT) is a collection of objects and community archive representing the lives of transgender, non-binary and intersex people, curated by its founder E-J Scott. It is one of the first known collections of transgender artifacts, and as of 2019, it was the world's largest collection of material culture relating to transgender lives. It has appeared in exhibitions and holdings at the London College of Fashion, Brighton Museum & Art Gallery, the Bishopsgate Institute, the Whitechapel Gallery, and the Barbican Centre.

== Collection ==
The collection includes multiple pieces of usually mundane clothing, including t-shirts with activist slogans, a large number of protest placards from pride parades, correspondence with various institutions, popular publications, cosmetics, a large amount of pharmaceutical packaging (particularly for hormone replacement therapy), hospital robes, binders and packets of binding tape, homemade and mass-produced prosthetics, various video material, and preserved human flesh. Individual items include a letter from Queen Elizabeth II in acknowledgement of a successful legal gender change, a pair of children's ballet shoes, a My Little Pony toy, a pair of swimming goggles, and a breakup letter. Brown paper swing tags are attached to most objects in the collection with a handwritten description of the object and its meaning by its donor.

== History ==
The Museum began as series of grassroots community workshops in the Marlborough Pub and Theatre in Brighton in 2014, headed by E-J Scott. Following his own gender-affirming surgery, Scott had collected many of the objects that he had used in his hospital room, including his hospital gown, a morphine syringe, medicine cups, a balloon given to him by a friend that read "It's a Boy!," and his own breast tissue, preserved in formaldehyde. In 2014, he made use of these objects to ask others from the transgender community to contribute their own objects to the collection.

In January 2017, Ligaya Salazar commissioned from Scott an exhibit at the Fashion Space Gallery at the London College of Fashion, which he named the Museum of Transology. As well as the objects in the collection, the exhibition featured films about gender identity. By June of the same year, the collection contained around 120 objects from over 100 people. It moved to Brighton Museum & Art Gallery in 2018. By 2019, this had risen to over 250 objects from 120 transgender, non-binary, and intersex people. The collection moved to the Bishopsgate Institute (BI) in November 2019 as an archival holding. In 2020, the holding consisted of 213 files, 280 artefacts, and 155 paper tags. By 2022, the project had collected over 500 objects, including protest signs from a June 2020 Black Trans Lives Matter rally in London. Part of the collection was included in the exhibition We Get To Choose Our Families at Whitechapel Gallery, as well as in a 40th anniversary Out and About! exhibition in 2023 by the BI at the Barbican Centre.

In January 2023, the project was awarded funding by the Art Fund to establish the Trans Pride UK Collective, a national project connecting museums and archives across the UK. Also in January, it collected signs used in a protest against the use of Section 35 of the Scotland Act 1998 to block the Gender Recognition Reform Bill. The same year, the University of Leicester's Research Centre for Museums and Galleries (RCMG) published a transgender inclusion guidance document for museums and galleries the same year, featuring work from the Museum of Transology.

In April 2024, the Wellcome Collection hosted a Cult of Beauty exhibition involving some material from the Museum of Transology. The same month, the Museum of Transology organised a "National Day of Trans Collecting" in anticipation of its 10-year anniversary exhibition expected in 2025, with 15 "drop-off points" across the country for objects to be donated. This exhibition, Transcestry: 10 Years of the Museum of Transology, took place at Central Saint Martins' Lethaby Gallery from 11 March to 11 May 2025, and consisted of over 1,000 objects.

== Philosophy ==
The mission of the MoT has been described as "inherently radical". Scott has expressed that the collection is part of an effort to increase visibility of transgender people and gender diversity within museums and archives, and has said that "awareness is increasing in society about gender diversity... and yet the museums in the UK aren't collecting trans artefacts proactively." He places particular emphasis upon an effort to "de-spectacularize" transgender issues by focusing on everyday life and objects. He has also noted the intention to create a space for "trans people to talk for themselves, about themselves".

The collection resists the usual classification of objects in museums, including parameters such as object type, quality, and place and time of origin. It actively promotes the protests that it collects objects from, and organises workshops concerning conduct in these protests. It engages in community archiving, with volunteers meeting each month to archive and process new material donated to the collection. The organisation also makes use of social media, particularly Instagram, to engage with the LGBT community, and has been recognised for its engagement with radical trust.

== Reception ==
The exhibitions gained approval from academics. Jules Morgan, writing in The Lancet, observed that "the exhibition is intimate, informative, and bold—cultural in a sense, but without much overt political commentary." Cicely Proctor noted in Fashion Theory that "the success of collections such as the Museum of Transology prove the power of including [transgender] biographies in museum contexts, helping to validate and write in stories that have previously been excluded." Elke Krasny and Lara Perry in Museum International wrote that "in some parts of the exhibition, gender is presented in the register of the individual body and its discomforts and pleasures, while other dimensions of the exhibition invite us to reflect on the social, cultural, and commercial elements of those individual experiences," and that the exhibition "undoes the authority of the museum to inscribe knowledge of gender." Tijen Tunali in Afterimage described that the exhibition "offered universal themes of hope, despair, ambition, confidence, and desire," and that the photographs and notes which accompany the items could trigger "empathetic responses in the viewer through familiarity while complicating the viewers’ ability to be able to dismiss these trans objects as that of the Other."

Alex Esculapio of The Fashion Studies Journal stated in 2017 that the Museum "succeeds in presenting trans experiences as an undeniable facet of human experience." Alex Goldsmith at Evening Standard said that the collection of Black Trans Lives Matter protest signs at the 2023 Out and About! exhibition was "quite simply beautiful."
