= C. Richard Kramlich =

American venture capitalist (1935–2025)

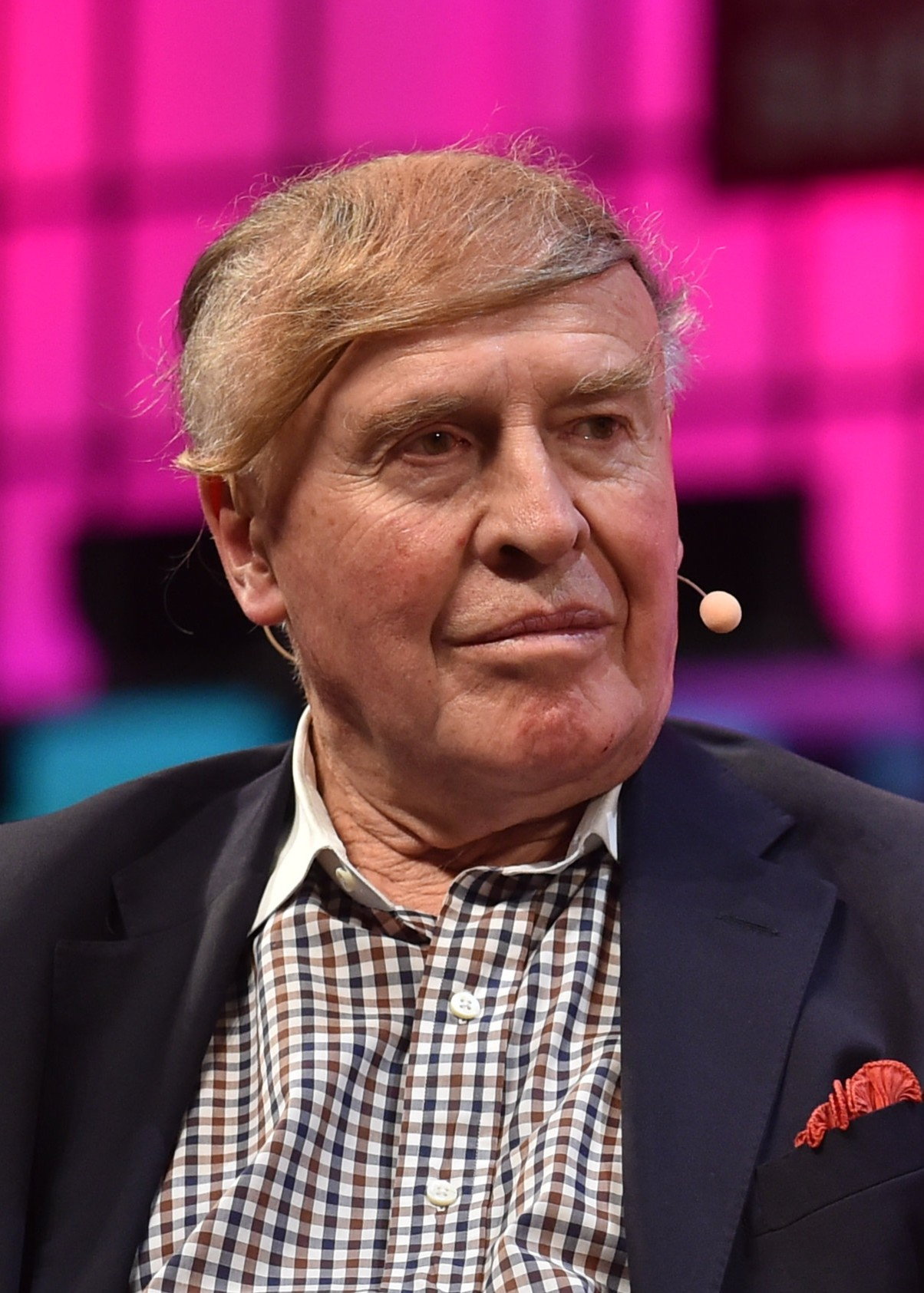
- Kramlich in 2017
- Born: Charles Richard Kramlich; April 27, 1935; Green Bay, Wisconsin, Wisconsin, U.S.
- Died: February 1, 2025 (aged 89); San Francisco, California, U.S.
- Other name: Dick Kramlich
- Occupation: Venture capitalist
- Known for: New Enterprise Associates
- Parent(s): Irving Kramlich, Dorothy Kramlich

C. Richard Kramlich (April 27, 1935 – February 1, 2025), born Charles Richard Kramlich, also known as Dick Kramlich, was an American venture capitalist.

His father was Irving Kramlich, a grocer who went on to open 25 food stores; the chain was purchased in 1955 by Kroger. His mother Dorothy (Earl) Kramlich was an aeronautical engineer.

Kramlich co-founded the venture capitalist firm New Enterprise Associates in 1977. He was one of the earliest investors in Apple Computer. His other investments included Silicon Graphics, Ascend Communications, and Juniper Networks.

Kramlich and his wife Pamela were among the first private collectors of new media such as video art and projected image installations, starting in the late 1980s. Kramlich died on February 1, 2025, at the age of 89 at his home in San Francisco. He graduated from Northwestern University (BA) and Harvard Business School (MBA).

== Legacy ==
The Kramliches founded the New Art Trust, in 1997; the consortium includes the Museum of Modern Art, New York, the San Francisco Museum of Modern Art, Tate, London, and the Bay Area Video Coalition. They donated twenty-one video and new-media works to the NAT collection in 2007. The Kramlich Collection has grown to 200+ works of film, video, slide, and installation, and "250 significant works of photography, sculpture, painting, and drawing by more than 230 artists from around the world". As of 2026 Shannon Jackson is Program Director of the Kramlich Collection and Kramlich Art Foundation.
