= Alan Wakeman (author) =

British author

- Born: 19 June 1936; Ramsgate, Kent, England
- Died: 8 August 2015 (aged 79); Soho, London, England
- Website: https://www.findagrave.com/memorial/302320757/alan-wakeman

Alan Wakeman (19 June 1936 – 8 August 2015) was a British author, playwright, vegan and gay rights activist.

== Biography ==
He was born in London and grew up in Coulsdon, Surrey. He attended Purley Grammar School and later did National Service in Singapore and Sri Lanka (then Ceylon). He worked as an architect before spending three years in France, after which he returned to Britain to work as a teacher of English as a foreign languages. Between 1967 and c. 1973 wrote an English language course called English Fast, which sold steadily for several decades. From the 1970s onward, he became a staunch member of the Gay Liberation Front. He wrote the first GLF song, A Gay Song (which was played at his funeral service) and was a founding member of the theatre troupe Gay Sweatshop in 1974. For nearly fifty years, he lived in Soho, London and became a dedicated campaigner against development of historical sites.

Wakeman was diagnosed with type 1 diabetes in 1970. He became a vegan in the 1970s and stated that "despite my early concerns for animal welfare - my original reasons for changing to my present vegan whole-food diet, were concerned more with health than ethics". He co-authored an early vegan cookbook with Gordon Baskerville in 1986.

== Doctor Who ==
In 1963, Wakeman was commissioned to write a serial for the first season of Doctor Who, which was then still in development. He produced a four-part story called The Living World, but David Whitaker eventually wrote to Wakeman's agent to say they were abandoning the script, as it would be impossible with contemporary production equipment, and that "one might say that the whole script was on too high a literary level for the sort of adventure serial we must have". Wakeman was paid a half fee of £75 for the work he had done. When the series was revived in 2005, Wakeman offered the unmade story to the series a second time, though it was not produced on this occasion either. Numerous elements of The Living World were used in the 2009 Easter Special episode Planet of the Dead though Wakeman never claimed plagiarism against credited writers Gareth Roberts or Russell T Davies. The script was eventually published in the magazine Nothing at the End of the Lane in 2012.

== Death ==
Wakeman died in August 2015, aged 79 after suffering for many years from diabetes. His funeral was held at St Anne's Church, Soho. He died soon after the publication of his autobiography Fragments of Joy and Sorrow.

Wakeman has no known direct living relatives. Close friends scattered his ashes on Farthing Downs near Coulsdon under a tree as per his wishes (approximate what3words location ///spring.book.senior)

== Partial bibliography ==
Title	Date	Genre	Publisher	ISBN	Notes
Londoners' London	1969	Photography	Rapp & Whiting	9780853911005	co-written with Michel Arnaud
Tim, Willie and the Wurgles	1976	Children's fiction	Abelard	0200722956	Illustrated by Chris Turnbull
Hamun and Giben	1978	Flash fiction	Gemini	095140931X	Also illustrator
The Vegan Cookbook	1986	Recipe book	Faber & Faber	9780571178049	co-written with Gordon Baskerville
Beloved Friend	1989	Poetry	Gemini	9780951409305	
Unzipped	2007	Poetry	Gemini	9780951409329	
Fragments of Joy & Sorrow	2015	Memoir	Gemini	9780951409336	
