= The V Girls =

The V-Girls was a feminist performance art group that was active from 1986 to 1996. Their works were later exhibited mostly in the United States but also in Germany, Sweden, and a few other countries. The V-Girls have performed one solo exhibition as well as six group exhibitions where their works mimic and critique academic egotism and critical theory, with emphasis on feminist viewpoints. They addressed the conflict between theory and practice, accessibility in feminist production, and topics like feminist generations.

== Background ==
Composed of Martha Baer, Jessica Chalmers, Erin Cramer, Marianne Weems and Andrea Fraser, the group was initially formed as a study group in order to meet-up and read feminist psychoanalytic theory, but soon morphed into discussions of their own art and scholarship.

The V-Girls were influenced by feminist inquiry in relation to institutions, such as universities. Feminist discussions regarding power relations, the status of women, and canon development lead to the need for ways of challenging normalized phallocentric ideas.

== Performance style ==
The V-Girls did not perform as a traditional theater group. Instead, they dissected and discussed various feminist works and topics. These presentations were scripted during private meetings prior to the performance. The five women would arrange themselves at a long table at the front of the room in order to form a discussion panel. This allowed them to be designated as presenters, symbolizing that all five women held equal influence at the long table, but were still part of the whole group. Four of them would be dressed in suits with thickly framed glasses, symbols of traditional power and intellect. The fifth would act as the discussion's mediator and would usually be dressed more casually, indicating a symbolic separation of social status. The panel would provide a comedic critique of various professional discourses within the spaces in which they originated, such as conferences, universities, art galleries and museums.

The V-Girls utilized humor and phrasing during their performances to present their points in a shocking, apparent way. The women would adapt various roles to build on these topics as seen in Manet's Olympia where Erin Cramer presents a sexist joke from the role of a power-hungry egotistical individual to expose how feminists are attacked for not brushing off sexism. They crafted their humor in a manner that simultaneously made them the subject and “the butt of the joke”, forcing the audience to reflect further on the meaning while also investigating their own roles. The V-Girls also occasionally included props and choreographed gestures into their presentations to further drive their points. By using these performance techniques, they made their critical discussions more diverse and less one-sided.

== Feminist topics ==
The V-Girls performances were satirical analyses of various works that drew from a wide range of subject matter. They primarily focused on issues like the role of women in various environments, hidden power structures in education, and the unequal distribution of education. Through the use of humor, the V-Girls highlight hardships faced by women who are given a disadvantage in male-led societies. The V-Girls challenged the foundation of these power structures instead of directly demanding equal power.

== Key works ==
The V-Girls first performance was titled Sex and Your Holiday Season and was performed in 1987 at Four Walls gallery in New Jersey.

Academic in the Alps: In Search of the Swiss Miss(s) took place in 1988 at the University of Massachusetts. This performance spoke about Johanna Spyri's children's book Heidi and topics regarding women in academia.

The V-Girls/MATRIX 123 exhibition took place in 1989 at Berkeley Art Museum and Pacific Film Archive BAM/PFA.

The Question of Manet's Olympia: Posed and Skirted was first performed in 1989. Later performed 14 more times at various art and academic institutions like the Collage Art Association in San Francisco (1989) and the Institute of Contemporary Art in London (1990). This exhibition discussed art history and theory.

Daughters of the ReVolution was first performed in 1993 which covered generational differences within second and third-wave feminism.

To expose, to show, to demonstrate, to inform, to offer was performed in Vienna in 2015 at Museum Moderner Kunst Stiftung Ludwig (MUMOK).

The Looking Sideways at Minibar exhibition occurred in 2016 in Stockholm.
