= The Secretaries =

1994 Off-Broadway play by The Five Lesbian Brothers

- Written by: The Five Lesbian Brothers
- Characters: Dawn Midnight; Ashley Elizabeth Fratangelo; Patty Johnson; Susan Curtis; Peaches Martin; Buzz Benikee; Hank and Sandy; Mr. Ron Kembunkscher

Premiere
- Date: September 20, 1994
- Place: New York Theatre Workshop
- Official website

The Secretaries is a play written and performed by the performing troupe The Five Lesbian Brothers. It opened on September 20, 1994 at the New York Theatre Workshop.

== Characters ==
Dawn Midnight: "Office Lesbian".

While Dawn is billed as the "Office Lesbian", she is in reality just the only fully out lesbian. Over the course of the play, most of the female characters prove interested in or at least willing to participate in sexual activities with other women.

Ashley Elizabeth Fratangelo: "Susan's Sycophant, Bulimic".

Longstanding Secretary of the month.

Patty Johnson: "The New girl".

New secretary to be inducted into the cult.

Susan Curtis: "Office manager/ Cult Leader".

Peaches Martin: "Sweet, clueless, slow-moving target".

Secretary.

Buzz Benikee: "sensitive lumberjack".

Also Patty's male love interest.

Hank and Sandy: "Sexually harassing lumberjacks (slow)".

Mr. Ron Kembunkscher: "the boss".

Owner of Cooney Lumber Mill in Big Bone, Oregon.

== Plot summary ==
This satirical play opens with a rhyming prolog recited in unison by Dawn, Ashley, Peaches, and Patty. They explain that they are part of a cult that, once a month, gathers to murder one of the lumberjacks employed by the logging mill they work for, and blame it on a logging accident.

Scene one starts on the day Patty is promoted from being a receptionist to a secretary and starts on her path to join the cult, referred to in more public circles as the Big Bone Women's Association. Patty quickly learns that the office hierarchy circles around whoever currently holds the award of secretary of the month, an award that it seems is best won by being sexually pliable towards Susan, the office manager, and by maintaining an unrealistically thin figure.

As Patty works her way into the tightly knit clique of secretaries, she is introduced to some of the strange rituals and rules practiced by their cult. At the first meeting she attends, she is puzzled as to why Susan collects the women's used tampons, and why she is required to sign a pledge of celibacy to join.

Despite signing the pledge, Patty quickly finds herself in a sexual relationship with Buzz, one of the company lumberjacks, and shortly after, she also hooks up with Dawn, the "Office Lesbian". Despite Patty's pleading, neither secret remain so for long; soon the entire office knows.

As the end of the month approaches, Patty becomes stressed as she watches Susan and the rest of the secretaries become more and more manic. Susan starts drinking and driving, Peaches begins to binge eat, Dawn becomes more sexually aggressive, and Ashley becomes violently jealous over the fact that Patty wins secretary of the month.

On the last night of the month, Susan gathers the secretaries in the woods to kill a lumberjack, in this case, Buzz, and to steal his jacket for Patty, the newest member of the cult, to wear. While Patty resists at first, she quickly breaks down and admits that she wants to join in with the plan. After the women take turns chain sawing Buzz to death, the play ends with another short and chilling rhyme: "Patty's got her jacket now. She fits in with the rest. She cut her boyfriend into bits, and so she passed the test. Save? No. We’re way beyond saving. We’re at the end. We should provide a moral for this story, but this is not a moral tale or complex allegory. No, we prefer you think of this as purely cautionary. Remember, sitting next to you could be a secretary!".

== Reception ==
The Secretaries was widely reviewed upon opening as more comical than it was meaningful. James Hannaham of The Village Voice wrote, "The Secretaries [is] funnier than it is plot-driven and potentially taxing at an hour and a half". Ben Brantley of The New York Times described The Secretaries as a "sometimes very funny, exercise in subverting American images of womanhood" that "plays on anxious male fantasies of what women do when they’re alone together; straight women's fantasies of lesbians (they're predatory)". Reviewers also agreed that the show was too long for a plot that is forecast from the opening scene: "What [Director Kate Stafford] doesn’t do is edit…the last half hour of the play drags, in part because the climax has been foretold but mostly because of repetition". While the show was not without its critiques, most reviewers also noted that the show had an enthusiastic audience: "Judging from the exultantly knowing audience reactions the night I saw the play, this cult of man-sawing office girls seems destined to find a cult of its own".
