= Liu Beijin =

Liu Beijin (Chinese: 刘贝锦; 23 April 1902 – 1959), also known as Low Pui-Kim, Low Poey Kim and Liu Peh Jing, was a prominent rubber plantation owner in Malaya. In the 1920s, he produced New Friend, which is considered to be the first Singaporean feature film, and founded the first film production company in Singapore and Malaya. He was among the Nanyang Overseas Chinese mechanics serving in Burma against the Japanese in the Second Sino-Japanese War. Following the end of World War II, he was stranded in China due to the Chinese Civil War. He was detained first by the Kuomintang and then by the Chinese Communist Party, who both accused him of being an operative of the other. He died while in prison.

== Early life and education ==
According to Liu's Record of Returning Home, he was born in Singapore on 23 April 1902 and moved to Muar, Malaysia with his family four months later. However, his son later claimed that he was born in Muar. Liu was the second son of Liu Zhuhou, a wealthy rubber plantation owner who came to Malaya from the town of Huyang in Yongchun County. A student of the Muar Chinese School, now the Chung Hwa High School, Liu was well-read and well-educated. He was said to have had a "good command" of the English, Chinese, Malay, French, Thai and Burmese languages. In his youth, he befriended the prince of the Johor sultanate. When he was six, his father took him to China, where he remained until he was 16.

== Career ==
Liu returned to Muar and took over ownership of his father's business following the latter's death. He also established his own rubber plantation company. From December 1925 to February 1926, he travelled to Shanghai. While there, he took the opportunity to observe the film industry in Shanghai. He met Guo Chaowen, a cinematographer working in the industry. Upon returning to Singapore, Liu wrote a travelogue documenting his trip. The book was over 300 pages long and included observations on various aspects of Chinese culture and society in addition to the Shanghai film industry. Liu also owned a cinema in Malaya.

In 1934, Liu was invited to visit China, then under Kuomintang rule. After consulting the prince of the Johor sultanate, he organised a tour of Shanghai lasting more than ten days in which he was accompanied by over 20 Chinese high school students from Malaya. He founded the SJK (C) Yu Jern school in Bukit Pasir and the Yanta School in the Yongchun County of the Fujian province. He also donated to several schools and Shanghai. Liu's father was a cousin of the father of prominent Singaporean artist Liu Kang. According to Liu Kang, Liu Beijin had an affinity for luxury cars and would often compete with the Sultan's son in purchasing the latest luxury cars.

=== Film ===
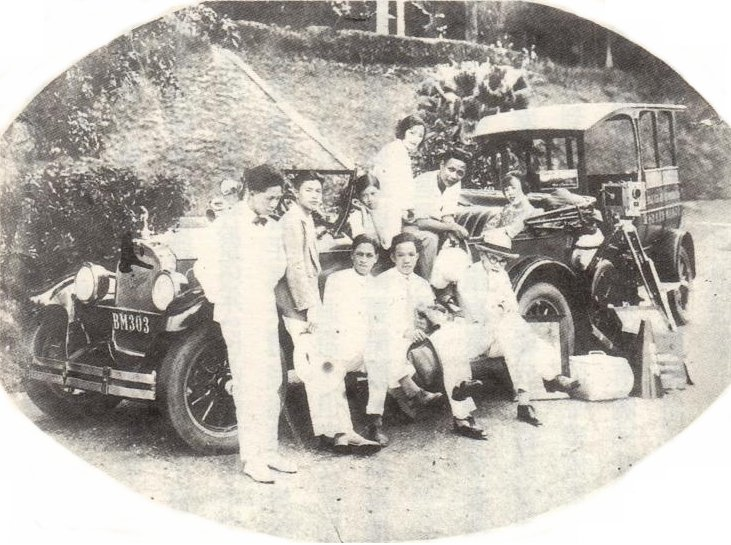
Still from New Friend

Inspired by what he saw of the film industry in Shanghai, he established the Anglo-Chinese Film Company, with which he distributed Shanghai-made films. He then founded the Nanyang Liu Beijin Independent Film Production Company, also known as the Nanyang Low Poey Kim Motion Picture Co., the first film production company in Singapore and Malaya. It was also among the first in Southeast Asia. A shophouse at 12 Pekin Street housed the company's offices while Liu rented out a bungalow at 58 Meyer Road, which served as a film studio. It also housed a staff dormitory, a film processing room and changing rooms for actors. Liu wished to "showcase life as it was in Singapore and Malaya to the Chinese in China", viewing film as a medium by which he could "instill knowledge among the masses, improve the well being of society [and] promote the prestige of the nation and propagation of culture."

Liu invited Guo to come to Singapore to aid him in film production. The company received two scripts, one from Zhang Rentian and another from Chen Xuepu. The latter's script was chosen, with Chen set to be the director and Guo the cinematographer. However, due to disputes between Guo and Chen, the latter left, leaving the former as the film's director and producer, while Liu contributed to the script, naming the heroine Wai-ching after his youngest daughter. The heroine is also provided with a tour of the Johor Royal Palace, reflecting Liu's own experiences as a friend of the royal family. Filming of New Friend lasted from September 1926 to early 1927, with the entire film being shot in Malaya. The film premiered on 4 March 1927 without the last three reels of the nine-reel film and was later screened elsewhere in Malaya. It has since been considered the first Singaporean-produced film. However, it was reportedly not a success. Liu had initially planned to produce a second feature, titled A Difficult Time. However, this never materialised as he shut down the Nanyang Liu Beijin Independent Film Production Company for "personal reasons" in May 1927. He unsuccessfully attempted to revive the business in 1929.

However, Hee Wai-Siam notes that the film's Peranakan characters are portrayed with negative characteristics, arguing that this demonstrates that Liu identified more with Chinese than Peranakan culture. He writes that Liu's "voluntary abandonment of his powerful Peranakan identity and willingness to let the Peranakan Hui receive a Chinese language education represents the historical trend of the re-Sinification of the Peranakan at the beginning of the 20th century", as well as his "pity and support for the relatively weak and marginalised xinke community." Hee further argues that this was the reason why Liu, seeking to "improve the ‘un-Chinese’ customs and culture of the Peranakan", had chosen to side with Guo instead of Chen, as Chen's original script had initially focused more on showcasing local Peranakan culture. He concludes that Liu's views represented the "embodiment of the cultural production of a Chinese historical identity among pre–Cold War S.E. Asian Chinese people."

== Wars and incarceration ==
Following the outbreak of the Second Sino-Japanese War in 1937, which caused the rubber trade to decline, a dispute between Liu and his brothers led to him leaving the family business. He was among the 3,000 Nanyang Overseas mechanics recruited by Tan Kah Kee, then-chairman of the Singapore Overseas Chinese Relief Fund Committee, who were dispatched to various locations along the Burma Road. He left Singapore to take up his post on 27 March 1939. In addition to this, Liu also contributed funds to the war effort. He was appointed the leader of the volunteers' third group. As leader, he led 594 men to the road, where they were to support Kuomintang forces against the Japanese. He was also appointed the leader of the pioneer battalion, transporting military materials. His son later claimed that Liu was praised by both Tan and Chiang Kai-shek for his work.

At the start of the Chinese Civil War, which began immediately after the Second Sino-Japanese War, Liu was in Yunnan, China. However, as a result of the war, Liu did not receive approval to return to Malaya, leaving him stranded in China, where he refused to participate in the ongoing conflict. He became a critic of the Kuomintang after what he saw of them in the Second Sino-Japanese War and was detained by them soon after in a prison in Kunming on suspicion of being a member of the Chinese Communist Party, during which he was subject to torture. When the People's Liberation Army took over Yunnan, Liu was released from prison in a "very ill" state. In 1956, he made several appeals to return to Southeast Asia. However, this made the Chinese Communist Party suspect him of being a member of the Kuomintang, resulting in him again being detained, this time at the Chongqing Songshan prison farm. He "lost his freedom of speech and was subjected to forced labour on a daily basis." He remained there until his death in 1959. Liu was buried in the Chongqing Geleshan Martyr Cemetery.

In May 1989, the Sichuan Provincial People's Government officially recognised the contributions of the Nanyang Overseas mechanics, including Liu, to the war effort. On his son's appeal, the Chongqing Municipal Public Security Bureau acknowledged both Liu's contributions to the war effort and that he was "undeserving" of incarceration in 1991. He was posthumously awarded a medal from Taiwanese president Ma Ying-jeou in 2015.
