= New Enterprise Associates =

American venture capital firm

- Type: Private
- Industry: Venture capital
- Founded: 1977; 49 years ago
- Founders: Dick Kramlich; Chuck Newhall; Frank Bonsal
- Key people: Scott Sandell Exec. chairman; Tony Florence, Co-CEO; Mohamad Makhzoumi, Co-CEO
- AUM: $25 billion (2023)
- Website: www.nea.com

New Enterprise Associates (NEA) is an American venture capital firm investing across growth stages, with a focus on technology and healthcare companies. With over $25 billion in committed capital, NEA is one of the world's largest venture capital firms.

== History ==
NEA was founded in 1977 by C. Richard (Dick) Kramlich, Charles (Chuck) Newhall III, and Frank Bonsal, Jr. Kramlich had worked with noted venture capitalist Arthur Rock beginning in 1969 and Frank Bosnal had been an investment banker at Alex. Brown & Sons where he focused on initial public offerings (IPOs) for startup companies. Chuck Newhall had previously managed an investment fund for T. Rowe Price in the 1970s. The firm was founded with offices on both the East Coast and the West Coast. Among the firm's first investments was 3Com, which NEA backed along with Mayfield Fund and Jack Melchor in 1981.

The first NEA investment fund had only $16 million of capital. The firm's second fund raised $45 million and the third fund collected $125 million of commitments from investors in 1984. The firm continued to grow steadily throughout the 1980s and early 1990s raising $900 million from 1987 through 1996 across NEA's next four funds. Beginning with NEA-8 in 1998, the firm greatly increased the size of its investment funds. NEA's tenth fund had $2.3 billion of investor commitments in 2000. After raising a more modest $1.1 billion in 2004 for the firm's eleventh fund, NEA raised $2.3 billion and $2.5 billion for its next two funds, respectively.

In 2010, NEA launched its thirteenth investment fund with $2.5 billion of investor capital, the largest since the 2008 financial crisis. In 2012, NEA closed its fourteenth investment fund with $2.6 billion of investor capital.

In April 2015, NEA closed its fifteenth investment fund with $3.1 billion in investor capital - the largest venture capital fund ever raised. In June 2017, NEA closed its sixteenth investment fund with $3.3 billion in investor capital - again the largest venture capital fund ever raised.

Co-founder Chuck Newhall's 2022 book, Dare Disturb The Universe: A Memoir of Venture Capital, was chosen as a Smithsonian Scholars pick of the year.

In 2025, some of NEA's investments included Acadia Pharmaceuticals, Adaptimmune, Alimera Sciences, Amicus Therapeutics, Clovis Oncology, Databricks, Prosensa, and Tesaro.

== Operations ==
The firm is headquartered in Menlo Park, California, with offices in Timonium, London and New York City, and affiliates in Mumbai, Bangalore, Beijing, and Shanghai.

Since its founding, NEA has invested in nearly 1,000 companies, largely in technology and healthcare industries, realizing over 650 liquidity events (with over 250 portfolio company IPOs and over 300 portfolio company acquisitions). In 2012, its over $14 billion VC capital was invested in nearly 50 biopharma companies, through 14 funds.

In 2018, former CEO of General Electric, Jeff Immelt, joined the firm as a venture partner.

== See also ==
- Flagship Pioneering, life sciences venture capital firm
