= Frank Theatre Company =

Canadian theatre company

Frank Theatre Company, formerly known as Screaming Weenie, is a professional theatre company in Vancouver, British Columbia, Canada committed to the production, promotion and development of queer and sex positive arts and artists. The company defines 'queer' as individuals and groups outside of sexual and gender norms. Frank Theatre Company is a non-profit society and a federally registered charity.

== Early years ==
Incorporated in 2003 with co-founder and original artistic director Ilena Lee Cramer at the helm, the company established itself by staging new plays and creative collaborations at Vancouver night clubs. While Screaming Weenie was a self-described 'queer company', a descriptive quote from Cramer from the on-line magazine Word Play in 2004 reads, "The Weenies do theatre for a wide audience - I'm interested in reaching those who are disenfranchised by art".

Original creations by Screaming Weenie in this period included The Bacchae - an electronic opera, The Sound of Disco and The Wizard of Glam. The company also produced the plays Belly by Dawn Wendy McLeod, Clue in the Fast Lane by Ann Marie MacDonald and Beverley Cooper, The Well of Horniness by Holly Hughes and Lounge by Tanya Marquardt.

== Second stage ==
Seán Cummings was hired as the company's artistic director in 2008. Cummings had previously worked with other theatre companies in Vancouver on seminal queer-themed works as Martin Sherman's Bent, Brad Fraser's Poor Super Man and Richard Greenberg's Take Me Out. Under Cummings' leadership, the company produced the highly acclaimed world premiere of C. E. Gatchalian's Falling In Time, which was nominated for the 2013 Lambda Literary Award. Cummings left the company in 2012, and was succeeded by Gatchalian. In 2016 Gatchalian, as Artistic Producer of the company, co-founded and co-produced Q2Q: A Symposium of Queer Theatre & Performance in Canada, one of the first ever national conferences focused on queer theatre and performance in Canada, in partnership with Simon Fraser University.

In late 2017, Gatchalian left the company, and was succeeded by current Artistic Director Fay Nass.
