= John Roman Baker =

British writer

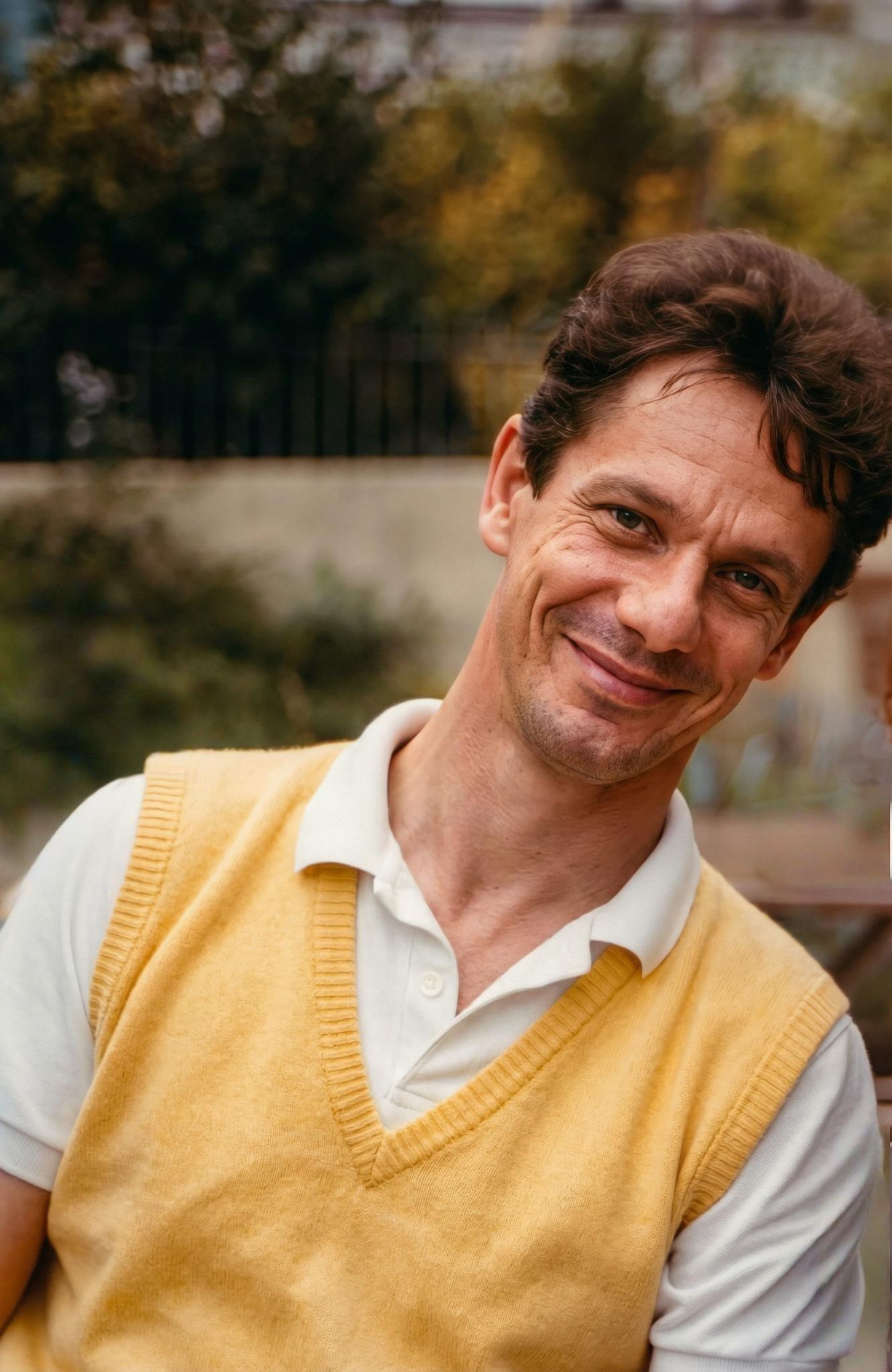
- Baker in 1988
- Born: September 2, 1944 (age 82); England
- Occupations: Writer; Theatre Director

John Roman Baker (born September 2, 1944) is a British writer and theatre director.

== Theatre ==
In 1975, his first play Limitations launched the first season of the Gay Sweatshop Theatre company. In 1989, his play Crying Celibate Tears was presented at the Sussex Aids Centre) within the context of the Brighton Festival. A 'festival within a festival', staged at the Sussex Aids Centre, also included work by Philip Core, Peter Burton and Neil Bartlett. Crying Celibate Tears received critical acclaim from the Brighton press, The Guardian and Plays and Players and was the launching pad for Aids Positive Underground Theatre, the company founded by Baker as a positive cultural response.

In June 1992, Michael Arditti, wrote in Plays International that: "...in England too the theatrical response [to AIDS] has been maturing ... and has come of age with John Roman Baker's "Crying Celibate Tears Trilogy" ... The keynotes of Mr Baker's writing are already in evidence; a barbed wit, an utter lack of sentimentality and a refusal to shy away from unpalatable truths ... the one horror which is happily absent being political correctness. ... In short, this is the real world: a humorous, harrowing, heartening world, and one which remains engrossing for the entire six hours of its length. ... Seen as a whole, the Trilogy is an overwhelming experience."

At the 1993 Edinburgh Fringe, Aaron Hicklin wrote for The Independent: "Aids Positive Underground are no sissies. "Easy" is uncomfortable viewing, often disturbing, and ugly to watch, considerably more than a safe-sex message. It is about love and dignity, loss and anger."

Performed plays include:

- Limitations, 1975
- Crying Celibate Tears, 1989
- The Ice Pick, 1990
- Freedom to Party, 1991
- The Crying Celibate Tears Trilogy, 1992
- Easy, 1993
- In One Take, 1994
- The Last Century of Desire, 1995
- QueerBashed, 1995
- Russian Roulette; 1998
- The Pornographic Wall; 1998
- Heroes, 1999
- The Prostitution Plays, 2000
- The Club Beautiful, 2001
- Sexually Speaking 1+1, 2001
- The War Fuck, 2002
- East Side Skin, 2003
- Things Happen, 2004
- Romophobia, 2005
- Prisoners of Sex, 2006
- Touched, 2008

Adapted work by other writers:

- Close to the Knives (David Wojnarowicz), 1993

Unperformed plays include:

- Gala, 1990
- Ibsen’s Ghosts, 2004
- After a War, 2016
- Remainers, Apologies Not Included, 2019

His work has been produced in many countries. From 1990–1996 the Brighton and Edinburgh Festivals often saw the first performances of his new plays. In 1990, his play The Ice Pick won the "Zap" Award for best theatre at the Brighton Festival jointly with the Satirikon theatre of Moscow. The controversy and opposition towards his work and that of Aids Positive Underground Theatre, garnered support and friendship from other artists, notably Howard Barker, Lindsay Kemp and Derek Jarman. He was the first dramatist to adapt the work of American artist David Wojnarowicz for the stage. Close to the Knives was performed at the 1993 Brighton Festival with the role of David Wojnarowicz played by actor Simon Merrells. In 1994 the success in Edinburgh of In One Take led to performances at Teatri di Vita, Bologna, Italy. Since then, his work has continued to be popular in Italy and has been seen in Florence, Modena, Forlí, L'Aquila, Reggio Emilia, Rome and Milan. His most popular work The Ice Pick has been staged on multiple occasions in the UK and Italy as well as in the US at the Celebration Theatre, Los Angeles in 1993.

He moved to Amsterdam, the Netherlands in 1997, where he continued the work of Aputheatre until 2008. During this period the focus of his work was mainly focused on the personal and social effects of pan-European migration following the collapse of communism.

In 1999 he updated and reworked The Ice Pick for 2 characters under the title Heroes. Heroes was toured by Aputheatre around the Netherlands before being performed in Warsaw as part of the 1st Polish Gay Pride festival. The Prostitution Plays was premiered for Warsaw Gay Pride in 2000 and in 2001 his play Sexually Speaking 1+1 was presented in Kyiv, Ukraine.

Following its Amsterdam premiere, his play Prisoners of Sex was translated into Italian by Antonio Serrano as Prigionieri del Sesso and has been performed in Milan and Rome.

== Critical reception and scholarship ==
Baker's AIDS-related plays are discussed at length in Dirk Visser's doctoral thesis Plague Reenacted: Memorializing the AIDS Crisis in British and North-American Drama (Radboud University Nijmegen, 2025).

Visser argues that academic attention to AIDS theatre has concentrated on Larry Kramer's The Normal Heart and Tony Kushner's Angels in America, and sets these against lesser-known plays preserved in archives or manuscript. He describes Baker as the most prolific AIDS playwright among the authors he studies, having written more than twenty AIDS-related plays with Aids Positive Underground Theatre, and also as one of the least known.

Visser compares Freedom to Party (1991), set after a cure for AIDS has been found, with Angels in America as plays that imagine how the epidemic will be remembered, arguing that Baker's play anticipates that stigma would outlast the disease. He discusses Prisoners of Sex (2006) in a chapter on theatrical responses to barebacking, reading its one-act plays as exploring different aspects of barebacking and bug-chasing.

Baker's later plays The Prostitution Plays (2000) and Prisoners of Sex (2006) are also included in Davide Passa's corpus-linguistic study of 21st-century British gay drama, (Un)Veiling Sexual Identities: Plays, Characters and Language in 21st Century British Drama (2024), which examines their non-British settings, portrayal of closeted characters, and use of sexual vocabulary and innuendo.

== Fiction and poetry ==
Published works include:

- Cast Down, Outposts Publications, London, 1968
- Gethsemane, Outposts Publications, London, 1969
- The Dark Antagonist, Unicorn Bookshop, Brighton, 1973. An unusual, mystical novel of a sexually repressed young man who encounters angelic forces.
- Poèmes à Tristan, G. Oberlé, Paris, 1974.
- No Fixed Ground, Wilkinson House, London, 2011. Part of The Drift of Time literary series. A vivid, hallucinatory novel that explores a young man's experience of friendship, sex and obsession amid the sexual liberation of mid-1970s England.
- The Sea and the City, Wilkinson House, London, 2012. Rich in symbolic imagery THE SEA AND THE CITY follows a young man's quest for salvation in a parallel reality.
- The Paris Syndrome, Wilkinson House, London, 2012. Part of The Drift of Time literary series. A dark exploration of illicit desire, madness and paternal responsibility.
- The Vicious Age, Wilkinson House, London, 2014. Part of The Drift of Time literary series. Set in Amsterdam, The Vicious Age explores the painful realities of life in a city that has become more materialistic and vicious in its constant need to renew itself.
- Brighton Darkness, Wilkinson House, London, 2015. Brighton Darkness is a collection of 17 stories that mostly relate to the city of Brighton & Hove. The stories span the decades from the 1950s to the present day and explore the many contradictions and quirks that define the city's unique character. Gay life in the city runs as a theme through many of the stories, while the author's experiences of other cities, Amsterdam, Paris and New York add a global context to the book. Another recurrent theme is that of return.
- Nick & Greg, Wilkinson House, London, 2016. Part One of the Nick & Greg Books, introducing the characters Nick and Greg: two gay teens growing up in 1950s Brighton.
- Time of Obsessions, Wilkinson House, London, 2017. Part Two of the Nick & Greg Books focuses on Greg's life after he leaves home and attempts to find his place first in Brighton and then in London. Set in the early sixties and featuring the iconic Chelsea lesbian and gay clubs Le Gigolo and Gateways Club.
- Nick's House, Wilkinson House, London, 2018. Part Three of the Nick & Greg Books. Nick and Greg, reunited in Brighton in the late 1960s defy convention and live by their own subversive sexual rules.
- Greg in Paris, Wilkinson House, London, 2019. Part Four of the Nick & Greg Books. Paris 1969. Greg and Bart go to Paris in search of Karel, and Greg is led into unexplored physical, emotional and philosophical territory.
- Le Far West, Wilkinson House, London, 2019. A fictional study of one man's experiences in a Paris gay porn cinema in 1988.
- 2020, Wilkinson House, London, 2020. Part of The Drift of Time literary series. Alex and Paul meet at the beginning of a crisis that will engulf the world, and they choose to defy the darkness ahead.
- Love & Cowardice, Wilkinson House, London, 2021. Part Five of the Nick & Greg Books. Brighton 1973. Nick meets Nathan, a young supporter of the Gay Liberation Front. There is news from Bart, Karel & Greg and an encounter with Bill Butler at Brighton's Unicorn Bookshop.
- Nick's Fugue, Wilkinson House, London, 2023. Part Six of the Nick & Greg Books. It's the early 1980s, and the gay community itself is facing a brutal challenge. Nick leaves his home and finds himself in a destructive relationship that is both sexually and emotionally abusive, but when he is given the chance to help another person, he finds a new sense of purpose in life.
- Greg at the Station, Wilkinson House, London, 2024. Part Seven of the Nick & Greg Books. Paris 2019. An incident at the Gare du Nord sends Greg on a rollercoaster journey through dreams and memory. As he navigates the streets and Metro stations he must relive and decipher past events and relationships to make sense of his complex present reality.
- Men in their Passions, Wilkinson House, London, August 2025. Part of The Drift of Time literary series. A spare and elegiac novel that traces the emotional aftermath of desire through a series of male relationships—each brief, each flawed, each formative.
- Disarranged, Wilkinson House, London, January 2026. A trio of absurdist‑realist texts: the violent madness of Carved, the darkly spiralling murder narrative of Disarranged, and the inevitable Dot, where a man, confronted by the machinery of the so‑called law, disappears into a final dot of insanity. Part of The Drift of Time series.
- Karel & Joe, Wilkinson House, London, October 2026 (forthcoming). Part Eight of the Nick & Greg Books.

== Personal life ==
John Roman Baker spent his formative years in London. At the age of 20 he moved to Paris, where for several years he worked at the British Institute. His poetry was encouraged by the then director of the Institute, Francis Scarfe. Later, in 1974 a volume of his poetry Poèmes à Tristan was published in French by Gérard Oberlé, translated by Françoise du Chaxel, and with an introduction by Jeanne Fayard. He has always considered himself foremost a poet, and a vein of poetry continues in his plays and novels.

In 1970 he moved from Paris back to England. His poetic novel The Dark Antagonist was published by the Unicorn Bookshop, Brighton in 1973. In response, the French writer Julien Green wrote "John Roman Baker … a very talented writer, author of a remarkable and moving book: The Dark Antagonist, which I have just read with admiration. I don’t believe I have read anything like it."

John Roman Baker was active in the Gay Liberation Front in Brighton and participated in the organization's pioneering "Gay Day" in 1972 and first Gay Pride March in 1973.

Unwelcome notoriety was achieved when in 1976 he appeared with Tony Whitehead (later to become the first chairperson of the Terence Higgins Trust) in a Southern Television program about Gay Rights. They were pictured together kissing as one of them met the other off a train at Brighton station. As a result of this, Whitehead was immediately fired by his employer British Home Stores. A national outcry galvanised the gay rights movement, led by CHE (The Campaign for Homosexual Equality) and GLF (Gay Liberation Front).

In 1997 he left England for Amsterdam, where he was given the freedom to create and direct new work at the theatre in the former COC Amsterdam building on Rozenstraat until its closure in 2007.

In 2014 he returned to England and created a series of modern historical gay fiction, The Nick & Greg Books. The books chart the lives of two gay teenagers, Nick and Greg, who meet as teens in Brighton in the late 1950s. The books chart their lives and relationships in Brighton, London and Paris from the 1950s into the 21st Century. The books chronicle not only the massive social changes that occur, but also key literary and cultural influences.

In August 2018 and November 2019 he attended the Salon du Livre Gay (Gay Book Fair) in Paris to present The Nick & Greg Books and launch the fourth book in the series Greg in Paris as well as the limited edition hardcover Le Far West.

In June 2020 a novel entitled 2020 was published. The book, written immediately before the Covid-19 lockdowns began in France and the United Kingdom, presents two characters, Alex and Paul, seeking to defy the coming crisis.
