= Above the Stag Theatre =

Theatre in London, England

Above The Stag Theatre
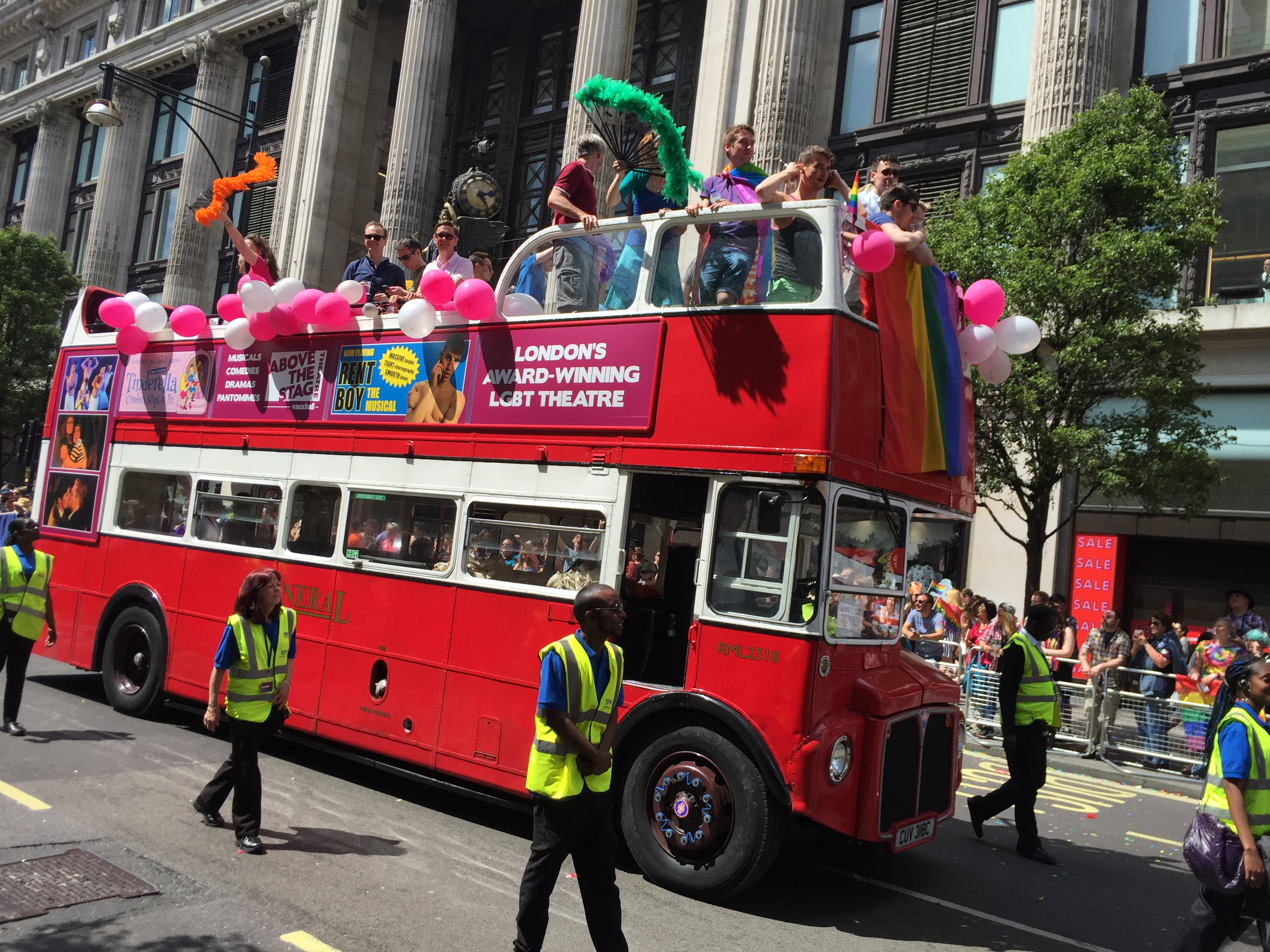
- Above The Stag at London Pride 2015
- Interactive map of Above The Stag Theatre
- Address: 72 Albert Embankment
- Location: London, SE1; United Kingdom
- Coordinates: 51°28′58.5″N 0°7′31.6″W
- Type: Theatre
- Event: LGBT
- Public transit: Vauxhall

Website
- abovethestag.org.uk

Above The Stag Theatre was an Off-West End theatre in London with a focus on producing LGBT-themed theatre. It was the only producing venue in the UK presenting a year-round programme of LGBT-interest theatre.

== History ==
Above The Stag Theatre was founded in 2008 by Peter Bull. From late 2008 to early 2012 its home was above The Stag, a gay pub in London's Victoria district, which has since been demolished. Following an 18-month search for a new home, the company moved to a renovated railway arch in Vauxhall, where it showed over 30 productions. The space comprised a 100-seat main house, a 70-seat cabaret lounge and a bar. In June 2018, after a major fundraising campaign, Above The Stag Theatre moved to a new premises on the Albert Embankment. On 7 August 2022, the theatre announced that it had ceased trading and permanently closed its Vauxhall venue.

Since the closure of its dedicated theatre space, the Above The Stag production company has continued to present LGBT-themed shows at other London venues.

== See also ==
- LGBT culture in London
