= LJ Parkinson =

British actor

Lucy Jane Parkinson or LJ Parkinson is a British actor and drag king better known by the stage name LoUis CYfer.

== Education ==
Parkinson studied performing arts at Rotherham College of Arts and Technology in South Yorkshire and contemporary theatre and performance at Manchester Metropolitan University before gaining an MA in contemporary performance making at Brunel University London.

== Career ==
Parkinson played the central character Joan of Arc and all the other, male, characters in Joan, written and directed by Leo Skillbeck for the Milk Presents company. Performances included Camden People's Theatre in 2015, the Edinburgh Fringe Festival in 2016 (winning a Scotsman Fringe First award and The Stage award) and 2017, the Oval House Theatre, Brixton, in 2017 and Spazju Kreattiv in Malta in 2018.

In 2017 they were one of the cast of four in Milk Presents' production Bullish, a retelling of the myth of the minotaur, at Camden People's Theatre.

In Summer 2018 they played D'Artagnan in The Dukes' promenade production of The Three Musketeers, adapted by Hattie Naylor from Alexandre Dumas' novel, in Williamson Park, Lancaster. In this version D'Artagnan was a young woman aspiring to become a musketeer.

In 2019 Parkinson toured the UK as the lead role of Fiona/Adrian in the Olivier winning production of Rotterdam. The play follows a couple Alice and Fiona at the point in their relationship when Fiona reveals he has always identified as a male and now wants to start living as a man called Adrian.

Parkinson has since played a sellout run as Mrs Bedlam and Squire Wouldbe with The Young Vic Theatre as part of the Young Vic Unpacked season in She Ventures and He Wins.
