= Triangle Theater Company =

Defunct LGBT+ theatrical organization in Boston

The Triangle Theater Company was founded in 1980 by David M. Hough in Boston, Massachusetts. Triangle Theater was created to establish a place for theater by and about gays and lesbians. The company was a member of the Gay Theatre Alliance, created in 1978 to help develop and promote gay and lesbian theater across the country.

== History ==
In 1980, David M. Hough was a college graduate, unsuccessfully searching for theaters producing performances that reflected his life and sexual orientation. In an effort to change this, he placed an ad in a newspaper describing his project and found a half-dozen people who wanted to start a gay theater. The result was the Triangle Theater Company. Hough decided to name the company after the symbol used to designate homosexual men in Nazi concentration camps, mainly because the pink triangle was not publicly recognized as a gay symbol. When created, the Triangle Theater was and remained for several years the only gay-identified theater in Boston.

== Development ==
Although its first year was rather slow (only four people auditioned for a six-person show), within a few years, the Triangle Theater became a success with 200 actors regularly turning up for auditions. In 1987, when the Triangle Theater seemed to have found a permanent home in a union-owned South End building, Hough stepped down from the artistic director post, considering it was the right time to leave. The company continued to develop by promoting minorities' works and producing plays written by men and women from all origins and walks of life.

== Closing ==
After a disagreement with the building's owner, the Hotel Restaurant Institutional Employees and Bartenders Union (Local 26), the company lost its theater where most of its productions had been staged. The company rented space at the Institute of Contemporary Art for its March and June 1996 productions, but found itself unable to locate a new theater to stage their productions in the long-term. As a result, the Triangle Theater closed in 1996. Former Triangle members quickly joined and formed another theater company by the name of Open City.

== Production history ==
- 1980 Season "3 in a Single Key," a performance of three one–act plays
- 1980–1981 Season "Cross Your Heart and Hope to Lie," "Find Your Way Home," and "Happy Endings"
- 1981–1982 Season "Nice Habits" and "Niagara Falls"
- 1982–1983 Season "Boy Meets Boy" and "A Night Out with the Boys"
- 1983–1984 Season "Smaller Heartaches" and "A Piece of Cake"
- 1984–1985 Season "Franny, the Queen of Provincetown" and Cheryl Hoenenmeyer in Concert
- 1985–1986 Season "Bloolips: Living Leg–Ends" and "After Eleven"
- 1986–1987 Season "The Flames," "The Boys in the Band," and "As Is"
- 1987–1988 Season "The Normal Heart," "The Children's Hour," and "Torch Song Trilogy"
- 1988–1989 Season "The Mystery of Irma Vep," "Last Summer at Bluefish Cove," "The Buddy System," and "Breaking the Code"
- 1989–1990 Season "My Blue Heaven," "Vieux Carre," "The Gospel According to Omaha," and "Design for Living"
- 1990–1991 Season "Boy Meets Boy," "Backward, Turn Backward," "Beyond Therapy," and "Bent"
- 1991–1992 Season "The Shadow Box," "Base Camp," "Another Country," and "Movie Queens"
- 1992–1993 Season "Eye of the Gull," "Adam and the Experts," "Blood Relations," and "Camille"
- 1993–1994 Season "Green Fingers," "Gertrude Stein and a Companion," "Supporting Roles," and "Marvelous Party"
- 1994–1995 Season "The Lisbon Traviata," "The Well of Horniness," "Straight and Narrow," "Hannah Free," and "Ten Percent Revue"
- 1995–1996 Season "Cinderella: The Real, True Story," "Seating and Other Arrangements," and "Falsettos"
- ca. 1996 "Out!!!"

== Artistic directors ==
- 1980-1987 : David M. Hough
- 1987-1993 : Steve O'Donnell
- 1993-1994: Kate Caffrey
- 1994-1996: Steve O'Donnell

== Other Gay Theatre Alliance members ==
- TOSOS -The Other Side of Silence- (New York City), the first professional theatre company to deal openly and honestly with the gay experience
- The Glines (New York City)
- Meridian Gay Theater (New York City)
- Stonewall Theater (New York City)
- Diversity (Houston)
- Lionheart Gay Theater Company (Chicago)
- Diversionary Theatre/Productions (San Diego)
- Alice B. Theater (Seattle)
