= Camden People's Theatre =

Theatre in Camden, London, England

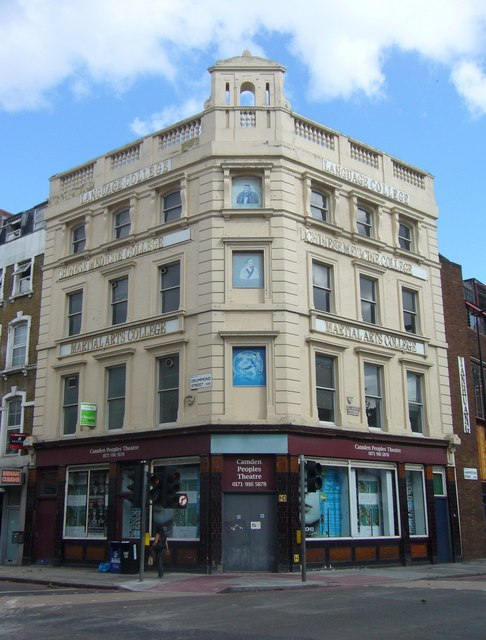
- Interactive map of Camden People's Theatre
- Address: 58-60 Hampstead Rd; London
- Location: Camden; London, NW1; United Kingdom
- Coordinates: 51°31′35″N 0°08′18″W
- Capacity: 63

Construction
- Opened: 1994; 31 years ago

Website
- cptheatre.co.uk

Camden People's Theatre is in the London Borough of Camden. It presents established and emerging artists.

== History ==
The theatre was founded by former members of Unity Theatre, after its closure in 1994.

In 2001 the venue was nominated for a Peter Brook Empty Space Award.

The theatre became a National Portfolio Organisation in 2014.

Their 2015 new Associate Artist scheme launched with Barrel Organ, Sh!t Theatre and Jamal Harewood.

In 2020 when the theatre was closed due to the COVID-19 pandemic, the building underwent redevelopment, funded by Arts Council England.

From 2001 to 2004, the theatre's artistic director was playwright Chris Goode. In 2021, Goode died by suicide shortly after being arrested for possession of indecent images of children.
