= Aputheatre =

Theatre company in Brighton, England

Aputheatre ("APU" or "APUT") is a theatre company in Brighton, England that began as the Aids Positive Underground Theatre Company. Founded in 1989 at the Sussex Aids Centre in Brighton, England, the objective was to provide a cultural response to HIV and Aids. The company quickly established a reputation for hard-hitting drama very much in the In-yer-face theatre style and a good example of queer theatre. From 1994 onwards, Aputheatre produced work that moved away from being exclusively about HIV-AIDS. Though HIV remained a key subtext in many works, other themes like prostitution, pornography, sexual politics became more important.

The company’s first production, Crying Celibate Tears by John Roman Baker, was performed as part of the Brighton Festival Fringe. It was an instant hit with public and critics alike and the company was invited to perform the following year as part of the main Brighton Festival programme at the Marlborough Theatre. This time the play was The Ice Pick and the company won the Festival Award for Best Theatre. The Los Angeles Times called the play "vivid and compelling".

The following year, in 1991, several sponsors withdrew funds from the Brighton Festival in protest at the company's inclusion, causing embarrassment within the festival administration and much public outcry. Political controversy often accompanied the company's performances. Politicians in Edinburgh and Forlì, Italy tried to gain votes by calling for theatres' funding to be withdrawn. Printers also refused to print festival brochures. Even within the company's home base, the Sussex Aids Centre, there was fierce opposition from some to the company's work which was considered too strong, too gay and which never followed a politically correct line. Such controversy and opposition also garnered support for the theatre company, notably from Lindsay Kemp and Derek Jarman.

Aputheatre became Brighton and Edinburgh Festival regulars. Between 1989 and 1997 their work was in many cities in the UK and internationally in Italy and the United States.

In 1998 Aputheatre's two founders, John Roman Baker and Rod Evan moved to Amsterdam, where a creative relationship was established with COC Nederland, a Dutch organization for LGBT men and women. The company initially developed four strong plays which explored the sub-culture of prostitution among young East European men living in Amsterdam. The Prostitution Plays' together with a later production Romophobia have charted the evolution and demise of male street prostitution in Amsterdam that has occurred at the beginning of the 21st Century.

With its establishment on the continent in the Netherlands, the company was able to take its work to other European countries, with tours in Italy, Poland and Ukraine.

In 2003, the controversial East Side Skin was performed in Amsterdam and Eindhoven. The play explored the attraction of the far right within gay subculture and was inspired in part by the assassination of Dutch populist politician Pim Fortuyn in 2002. A DVD of that production was released early in 2004.

In 2005, the play Romophobia explored the lives of two Romanians living illegally in Amsterdam, against a backdrop of sexual uncertainty and police harassment. The play highlighted the policy of police to raid gay bars on Amsterdam's Paardenstrat and then arrest, incarcerate and deport young men, with no legal representation. During the run of the play, perhaps as a result of publicity generated around the issue, the police raids stopped.

In 2006 with the production Prisoners of Sex author John Roman Baker and Aputheatre returned to their original theme of HIV-AIDS to explores the complexity and compulsions of unprotected sex among men.

The company's final production 'TOUCHED' premiered in Het Plein Theater, Amsterdam in December 2008. It was written and directed by John Roman Baker and performed by Luis Carrión and Richard Morris.

== Productions ==
- Crying Celibate Tears, 1989 (UK)
- The Ice Pick, 1990 (UK)
- Stretching Frontiers, 1990 (UK)
- LUST, 1990 (UK)
- You'll Never Walk Alone, 1990 (UK)
- Freedom to Party, 1991 (UK)
- Reflections of an Unsung Hero, 1991 (UK)
- The Crying Celibate Tears Trilogy, 1992 (UK)
- Easy, 1993 (UK)
- Close to the Knives, 1993 (UK)
- COCK!, 1993 (UK)
- In One Take, 1994 (UK, Italy)
- The Last Century of Desire, 1995 (UK, Italy)
- QueerBashed, 1995 (UK)
- Unmentionable, 1995 (UK)
- The Ice Pick, 1996 (UK, Italy)
- Russian Roulette; 1998 (Netherlands, Italy)
- The Pornographic Wall; 1998 (Netherlands)
- Heroes, 1999 (Netherlands, Poland)
- The Prostitution Plays, 2000 (Poland, Netherlands)
- Some Russians in Amsterdam, 2000 (Netherlands)
- The Club Beautiful, 2001 (Netherlands)
- Sexually Speaking 1+1, 2001 (Netherlands, Ukraine)
- The War Fuck, 2002 (Netherlands)
- East Side Skin, 2003 (Netherlands)
- Things Happen, 2004 (Netherlands)
- Romophobia, 2005 (Netherlands)
- Prisoners of Sex, 2006 (Netherlands)
- Touched, 2008 (Netherlands)
