= Gay Sweatshop =

British professional gay theatre company

Gay Sweatshop Theatre Company
- Company type: Independent Theatre Company
- Founded: 1975
- Founder: Drew Griffiths, Alan Pope, Roger Baker, Alan Wakeman (author), Laurence Collinson, John Roman Baker, E. D. Berman, Gerald Chapman, Philip Osment, Suresa Galbraith and Norman Coates
- Defunct: 1997

The Gay Sweatshop, founded in 1975, was Britain's first professional gay theatre company. In their original manifesto, the stated purpose was "To counteract the prevailing perception in mainstream theatre of what homosexuals are like, therefore providing a more realistic image for the public and to increase the general awareness of the oppression of sexuality, both gay and straight, the impact it has on people’s lives and the society that reinforces it."

In 1989 the company's appearance at the publicly-funded Project Arts Centre in Dublin sparked a public spat between senator and gay rights campaigner, David Norris and Lord Mayor of Dublin, Ben Briscoe after the latter objected to the event and publicly voiced his dislike of homosexuals. The company had previously performed in Dublin several times from 1976 including at Trinity College Dublin in 1978 in a production of the play As Time Goes By written by Noel Greig and Drew Griffiths.
