= C. E. Gatchalian =

Canadian author (born 1974)

- Born: June 5, 1974 (age 52); Vancouver, British Columbia, Canada
- Occupation: Author
- Writing career
- Period: 1990s–present
- Notable works: Motifs & Repetitions, Falling in Time, Double Melancholy
- Notable awards: 2013 Dayne Ogilvie Prize

C.E. "Chris" Gatchalian (born June 5, 1974) is a Canadian author who writes in multiple genres. Born in Vancouver, British Columbia, to Filipino parents, he holds an MFA in Creative Writing and Theatre from the University of British Columbia. His play Motifs & Repetitions aired on Bravo! (Canada) in 1997 and on the Knowledge in 1998. His other produced plays include Claire, Crossing, Broken, and People Like Vince, a play for young audiences about mental health. His latest play, Falling in Time, had its world premiere in Vancouver in November 2011 and was published by Scirocco Drama in 2012. In 2013, he won the Dayne Ogilvie Prize, a prize presented by the Writers' Trust of Canada to an openly LGBT writer. In 2019, his memoir Double Melancholy: Art, Beauty, and the Making of a Brown Queer Man was published by Arsenal Pulp Press.

== Personal life ==
He is openly gay, and is a three-time finalist for the Lambda Literary Award, including in 2013 for Falling in Time.

== Plays ==
- Motifs & Repetitions (1995)
- Claire (1999)
- Crossing (2004)
- Star (2005)
- Hands (2005)
- Broken (2006)
- People Like Vince (2011)
- Falling in Time (2012)

== Non-fiction ==
- Double Melancholy: Art, Beauty, and the Making of a Brown Queer Man (2019)

== Poetry ==
- tor/sion (2005)
