= Pomo Afro Homos =

African-American gay theater troupe

Pomo Afro Homos (1990–1995), short for postmodern African American homosexuals, was an African-American gay theater troupe founded in San Francisco by choreographer-dancer Djola Bernard Branner, actor Brian Freeman, and singer, dancer, and actor Eric Gupton. Later, Marvin K. White joined the group. They presented the black gay male experience. Their pieces include Fierce Love: Stories From Black Gay Life and Dark Fruit. They got their start through exposure via National Performance Network festivals.

== Behind the scenes ==
The original concept of the group was to show the issues affecting each black gay person, from family issues and AIDS to acceptance within the community and racism. These issues were controversial during this era because in the 1990s, famous athlete Magic Johnson had admitted to acquiring HIV from having multiple sex partners. David Roman had referenced these issues including the play Six Degrees of Separation, comparing them to one another because of their influence on the same subjects. Roman complemented the Pomo's on their bravery to show these subjects instead of backing down from the rejection they received in certain places.

The Pomo's shows started with a low budget, so they had few props, and the focus was on the actors. Many of the skits were based on Freeman's, Gupton's, and Branner's experience with their homosexuality and the society around them. The skits were portrayed by parodying, over acting, and truly speaking out about the problems they were faced with. In an article by Stephen Holden critiquing the Pomo's show, Dark Fruit (one of the Pomo's later pieces), is more comedic than Fierce Love. Holden praises Freeman for his acting and being able to expose himself on stage. He critiques Branner for his lack of charisma, but still complements him for being soft and moving.

== Fame and controversy ==
The group performed at Lincoln Center and elsewhere nationally.

The Village Voice reviewed their show, which reached an audience that followed their success.

In 1991, the National Black Theatre Festival (North Carolina) banned the group.

In 1993, Out North, a theater company in Anchorage, Alaska, invited them to perform in Anchorage. Out North attempted to purchase advertising from the city bus company for Fierce Love. The bus company, backed by then-mayor Tom Fink, rejected the ads. Later, the mayor attempted to cancel Out North's municipal funding. The city council overrode the Mayor's veto.

Brown University offers a course titled Black Lavender: A Study of Black Gay and Lesbian Plays, and Dramatic Constructions in the American Theatre which studies the works of Pomo Afro Homos among others.

== Legacy ==
The Pomo Afro Homos were received with open arms in many places (although not all), showing other generations what could become of their own problems when expressed and portrayed. They left room for others to contribute with ideas and start their own production. The show is still being performed today as Fierce Love (Remix) and continues to expose the issues of today and contrast with the concerns of the original production.
