= StageQ =

Theatre company based in Madison, Wisconsin

StageQ Logo

StageQ (sometimes erroneously written Stage Q) is a theatre company based in Madison, Wisconsin. It is a community theatre troupe, and its casts with few exceptions are all-volunteer. Since its inception in 2001 StageQ has been particularly dedicated to the performance of gay-themed plays and works by gay and lesbian playwrights (the Q suggesting the word "queer").

It was one of many organizations within the city of Madison selected in 2004 for criticism by the city's Catholic Bishop, Robert C. Morlino, as existing below a religious "moral minimum" within a city that has "virtually no public morality."

In 2006 StageQ was the recipient of an Annual Achievement Award given by OutReach, Madison's lesbian, gay, bisexual and transgender community center.

In 2012 the Isthmus selected StageQ's theater production "Queer Shorts on Stage Q"(sic) as its favorite theater production of the year.
