= The Five Lesbian Brothers =

American theater company

- Formation: 1989
- Type: Theatre group
- Location: New York City, New York
- Website: www.lisakron.org/Lisa-Kron-FiveLesbianBrothers.html

The Five Lesbian Brothers is an American theater company that focuses on plays and literature on lesbian and feminist topics. Their work has been produced and performed in several cities in the United States, and they have been recognized with several industry awards. Reviewers have described their performance style as being "loosely structured" and "outrageous", more focused on the expression of ideas and themes than on theatrical conventions of the time and genre. Their works are created collaboratively by the troupe, made up of Moe Angelos, Babs Davy, Dominique Dibbell, Peg Healey and Lisa Kron.

== History ==
The Five Lesbian Brothers started in the 1980s, first performing as satirists at the WOW Cafe in East Village, Manhattan and then producing the play Voyage to Lesbos there. Their next works were Brave Smiles, a satire about lesbian stereotypes, and The Secretaries, a play about caricatures of lesbians and feminists, both produced at the New York Theatre Workshop (NYTW). The Secretaries was reviewed in The New York Times and earned the Brothers increased recognition and a successful production run. Their next production, Brides of the Moon, was a bigger and more expensive production that featured a more elaborate set and costumes than previous productions. It performed poorly and was not well-received, however, and soon after The Five Lesbian Brothers stopped performing.

The Five Lesbian Brothers returned to performing in 2005 with Oedipus at Palm Springs, produced also by NYTW. Whereas earlier plays had been produced for a more specialized audience at the WOW Cafe interested in feminist and lesbian topics, the production of Oedipus at Palm Springs was noted for its success with the more mainstream audience of "conventional white, middle-class New Yorkers" at the NYTW. The individual members of the Brothers have gone on to successful solo careers, but they have not collaborated as a company since 2005.

== Produced works ==
=== Plays ===
- Brave Smiles: --another lesbian tragedy. In The Five Lesbian Brothers: Four Plays. New York; [Great Britain] : Theatre Communications Group, 2000. (Also New York : Samuel French, 2010.)
- Brides of the Moon. In The Five Lesbian Brothers: Four Plays. New York; [Great Britain] : Theatre Communications Group, 2000.
- Oedipus at Palm Springs. New York : Samuel French, 2010.
- The Secretaries. In The Five Lesbian Brothers: Four Plays. New York; [Great Britain] : Theatre Communications Group, 2000. (Also New York : Samuel French, 2010.)
- Voyage to Lesbos. In The Five Lesbian Brothers: Four Plays. New York; [Great Britain] : Theatre Communications Group, 2000.

=== Books ===
- The Five Lesbian Brothers’ Guide to Life: A Collection of Helpful Hints and Fabricated Facts for Today’s Gay Girl. New York : Simon & Schuster, 1997.
