= Triangle Productions =

Theatre producer in Portland, Oregon

Triangle Productions, stylised as triangle productions!, is a professional non-profit theatre in Portland, Oregon, United States. Founded by Donald Horn in 1989, Triangle is considered to be one of the longest-operating LGBTQ-identified theaters in the United States. Triangle Productions is located in The Sanctuary at Sandy Plaza in northeast Portland.

Triangle is managed by an eight-member board of directors and artistic director Horn. The company is a member of the Dramatists Guild of America.

Triangle was awarded the 2021 Oregon Heritage Excellence Award for The Darcelle Project.

== Notable productions ==
Make Me Gorgeous! is a one-man show adapted from the biography of Kenneth Marlowe. Triangle produced it in 2022, with its original title, Mr. Madam.

- The show was retitled Make Me Gorgeous! for the off-Broadway show in 2023. Make Me Gorgeous! ran at Playhouse 46 at St. Luke's, 308 West 46th Street, New York City, from November 10 through December 31, 2023 starring Wade McCollum. Make Me Gorgeous! was extended through January, starring McCollum; it was extended a second time, through March 24, 2024, starring Darius Rose.
- Make Me Gorgeous was nominated for three awards: the Lucille Lortel Award for Outstanding Solo Show; the Drama Desk for Best Solo Performance; and the Off-Broadway Theater Alliance for Best Solo Performance, which Wade McCollum won.

Tonya and Nancy: The Rock Opera. This musical is about Olympic ice skaters Tonya Harding and Nancy Kerrigan. The national premier was produced by Triangle, in Portland, in 2008. Tonya Harding attended on opening night in Portland. The play was written by Horn.

The Darcelle Project was a tribute to Walter W. Cole, an entrepreneur/drag performer whose stage name was Darcelle XV. Darcelle was noted in the 2016 Guinness Book of World Records as the Oldest Working Drag Queen. Cole was eulogized in The New York Times and on NPR when he died March 23, 2023, at 92. Components of The Darcelle Project include:

- Darcelle: That's No Lady (2019, 2025), a musical play about Cole. The play covers Cole's journey from a closeted married man with children to becoming a drag queen in the 1960s.
- "Many Shades of Being Darcelle: 52 Years of Fashion, 1967–2019". The Oregon Historical Society opened an exhibit featuring a selection of Darcelle's costumes on September 3, 2019.
- Walter Cole's 1896 Queen Anne-style home and his entertainment venue, the Darcelle XV Showplace, were listed in the National Register of Historic Places in 2020.

Dishin' with Divine (1995, 2025). Divine (Harris Glenn Milstead) was a character actor, singer and drag queen who worked with filmmaker John Waters. Triangle produced the play Dishin' With Divine in 1995. In 2025, Triangle produced readings of Dishin' with Divine In Manhattan, Palm Springs, and Los Angeles.
