= Obie Award for Distinguished Performance by an Actress =

Off-Broadway award in New York City

Obie Award for Best Actress
- Awarded for: Best Performance by an Actress in an Off-Broadway or Off-Off Broadway production
- Location: United States New York City
- Presented by: The Village Voice
- Website: http://www.obieawards.com/

The Obie Award for Distinguished Performance by an Actress is an annual award presented jointly by The Village Voice and the American Theatre Wing in recognition of achievements in Off-Broadway and Off-Off-Broadway theatre productions in New York City. The awards were established in 1956 by The Village Voice.

The award has no nominees and there is no set number of winners per year. Each performance listed by year below was given an award and they are listed in no particular order. The award can be for a lead or supporting performance and in a play or musical, and can recognize an actress for collective performances in more than one production during the same season. On occasion, the Obie Awards committee will give an actress an award "for sustained excellence of performance", recognizing their ongoing contributions.

In 2014, Sydney Lucas became the youngest winner in Obie history, at age 10. In 2025, the American Theatre Wing transferred internal funds to the support of 2025's Obie award winners, with grants totaling US$250,000.

== 1950s ==
Year	Winners	Play / Musical	Character
1956	Peggy McCay	Uncle Vanya	Sofia
1956	Shirlee Emmons	The Mother of Us All	Susan B. Anthony
1956	Nancy Wickwire	The Cherry Orchard	Varya
1956	Julie Bovasso	The Maids	Claire
1956	Frances Sternhagen	The Admirable Bashville	Lydia Carew
1957	Betty Miller	Exiles	Beatrice
1957	Marguerite Lenert	The House of Breath	Granny Ganchion
1957	Colleen Dewhurst	The Taming of the Shrew & The Eagle Has Two Heads & Camille	Kate / The Queen / Marguerite Gautier
1957	Jutta Wolf	Exiles	Bertha
1958	Grania O'Malley	Guests of the Nation	Kate O'Connell
1958	Nydia Westman	Endgame	Nell
1958	Anne Meacham	Garden District	Catharine Holly
1958	Tammy Grimes	Clerambard	The Flounder
1959	Nancy Wickwire	A Clearing in the Woods	Virginia
1959	Kathleen Maguire	The Time of the Cuckoo	Leona Samish
1959	Anne Fielding	Ivanov	Sasha
1959	Rosina Fernhoff	Fashion & The Geranium Hat	Gertrude / Anne-Betty

== 1960s ==
Year	Winners	Play / Musical	Character
1960	Eileen Brennan	Little Mary Sunshine	Mary Potts
1960	Patricia Falkenhain	Peer Gynt & Henry IV, Part 1	The Greenclad Woman / Doll Tearsheet
1960	Elisa Loti	Come Share My House	–
1960	Nancy Marchand	The Balcony	Irma
1961	Joan Hackett	Call Me By My Rightful Name	Chris
1961	Gerry Jedd	She Stoops to Conquer	Kate Hardcastle
1961	Surya Kamari	The King of the Dark Chamber	Queen Sudarshana
1961	Anne Meacham	Hedda Gabler	Hedda Gabler
1962	Ruth White	Happy Days	Winnie
1962	Sudie Bond	Theatre of the Absurd	Nell
1962	Barbara Harris	Oh Dad, Poor Dad, Mamma's Hung You	Rosalie
1962	Rosemary Harris	The Tavern & The School for Scandal & The Seagull	Virginia / Lady Teazle / Nina
1962	Vinnette Carroll	Moon on a Rainbow Shawl	Sophia
1963	Olympia Dukakis	A Man's a Man	Leocadia Begbick
1963	Madeleine Sherwood	Hey You, Light Man!	Lula Roca
1963	Jacqueline Brookes	Six Characters in Search of an Author	The Step/Daughter
1963	Anne Jackson	The Typists & The Tiger	Sylvia Payton / Gloria Fiske
1963	Colleen Dewhurst	Desire Under the Elms	Abbie Putnam
1964	Gloria Foster	In White America	Claudette Nevins
1964	Marian Seldes	The Ginger Man	Miss Frost
1964	Lee Grant	The Maids	Solange
1964	Joyce Ebert	The Trojan Women	Andromache
1964	Estelle Parsons	Next Time I'll Sing to You & In the Summer House	Lizzie / Gertrude Eastman Cuevas
1964	Diana Sands	The Living Premise in Living Color	Various Characters
1965	Sada Thompson	Tartuffe	Dorine
1965	Rosemary Harris	Judith & Man and Superman & War and Peace	Judith / Violet Robinson / Natasha Rostova
1965	Margaret DePriest	The Place for Chance	Various Characters
1965	Frances Sternhagen	The Room & A Slight Ache	Rose / Flora
1966	Clarice Blackburn	The Exhaustion of Our Son's Love	Sara Calendar
1966	Florence Tarlow	Red Cross & Istanbul & A Beautiful Day	The Maid / – / Various Characters
1966	Jane White	Coriolanus & Love's Labour's Lost	Volumnia / Princess of France
1966	Mari-Claire Charba	Birdbath	Velma Sparrow
1966	Sharon Gans	Soon Jack November	–
1966	Gloria Foster	Medea	Medea
1967	Bette Henritze	Measure for Measure & The Long Christmas Dinner & Queens of France & The Displaced Person & The Rimers of Eldritch & All's Well That Ends Well	Mariana / Ermengarde / Mademoiselle Pointevin / Mrs. Shortley / Mary Windrod / Mariana
1968	Peggy Pope	Muzeeka	Evelyn Landis
1968	Mari Gorman	The Memorandum & Walking to Waldheim	Maria / Zelda Sher
1968	Billie Dixon	The Beard	Harlow
1969	Arlene Rothlein	The Poor Little Match Girl	Girl
1969	Julie Bovasso	Gloria and Esperanza	Gloria B. Gilbert
1969	Judith Malina	Antigone	Antigone

== 1970s ==
‡ – indicates the performance was also nominated for a Tony Award (any of Actress in a Play or Musical, Featured Actress in a Play or Musical) after transferring to Broadway

Year	Winners	Play / Musical	Character
1970	Rue McClanahan	Who's Happy Now?	Faye Precious
1970	Sada Thompson	The Effect of Gamma Rays	Beatrice Hunsdorfer
1970	Roberta Maxwell	A Whistle In the Dark	Betty Carney
1970	Pamela Payton-Wright	The Effect of Gamma Rays	Matilda "Tillie" Hunsdorfer
1970	Fredricka Weber	The Last Sweet Days of Isaac	Ingrid / Alice
1971	Ruby Dee	Boesman and Lena	Lena
1971	Margaret Braidwood	Saved	Mary
1971	Joan MacIntosh	Commune	Big Time Clementine
1971	Susan Batson	AC/DC	Sadie
1972	‡ Elizabeth Wilson	Sticks and Bones	Harriet
1972	Jeanne Hepple	The Reliquary of Mr. and Mrs. Potterfield	Chloe Potterfield
1972	Marilyn Chris	Kaddish	Naomi Livergant Ginsberg
1972	Kathleen Widdoes	The Beggar's Opera	Polly Peachum
1972	Salome Bey	Love Me, Love My Children	Various Characters
1972	Marilyn Sokol	The Beggar's Opera	Lucy Lockit
1973	Alice Playten	National Lampoon Lemmings	Various Characters
1973	Jessica Tandy	Not I	The Mouth
1973	Mari Gorman	The Hot l Baltimore	Jackie
1973	Lola Pashalinski	Corn	Lola-Lola
1973	‡ Roxie Roker	The River Niger	Mattie Williams
1974	Barbara Barrie	The Killdeer	Sparky
1974	Loretta Greene	The Sirens	Pepper
1974	Barbara Montgomery	My Sister, My Sister	Mama
1974	Elizabeth Sturges	When You Comin' Back, Red Ryder?	Angel
1974	Conchata Ferrell	The Sea Horse	Gertrude Blum
1974	Zypora Spaisman	Stempenyu	–
1975	Cara Duff-MacCormick	Craig's Wife	Harriet Craig
1975	‡ Tovah Feldshuh	Yentl	Yentl
1975	Priscilla Smith	Fragments of a Greek Trilogy	Medea / Electra / Andromache
1975	Tanya Berezin	The Mound Builders	D. K. Eriksen
1976	Crystal Field	Day Old Bread	–
1976	Kate Manheim	Rhoda in Potatoland	Rhoda
1976	Pamela Payton-Wright	Jesse and the Bandit Queen	Belle Starr
1976	June Gable	The Comedy of Errors	Adriana
1976	Priscilla Smith	The Good Woman of Szechwan	Shen Te
1976	Joyce Aaron	Academics	–
1976	‡ Priscilla Lopez	A Chorus Line	Diana Morales
1977	Marian Seldes	Isadora Duncan Sleeps with the Russian Navy	Isadora Duncan
1977	Jo Henderson	Ladyhouse Blues	Liz
1977	Lucinda Childs	Einstein on the Beach	Various Characters
1977	Anne De Salvo	Gemini	Lucille Grande
1977	Roberta Maxwell	Ashes	Anne
1977	Lola Pashalinski	Der Ring Gott Farblonjet	Brunnhilda
1977	Margaret Wright	A Manoir	A Woman in White
1978	Swoosie Kurtz	Uncommon Women and Others	Rita Altabel
1978	Kaiulani Lee	Safe House	–
1978	Alma Cuervo	Uncommon Women and Others	Holly Kaplan
1978	‡ Nell Carter	Ain't Misbehavin	Nell
1979	Mary Alice	Julius Caesar & Nongogo	Portia / Queeny
1979	Elizabeth Wilson	Taken in Marriage	Aunt Helen
1979	‡ Constance Cummings	Wings	Emily Stilson

== 1980s ==
‡ – indicates the performance was also nominated for a Tony Award (any of Actress in a Play or Musical, Featured Actress in a Play or Musical) after transferring to Broadway

Year	Winners	Play / Musical	Character
1980	Lindsay Crouse	Reunion & Dark Pony & The Sanctity of Marriage	Carol Mindler / Daughter / Wife
1980	Hattie Winston	Mother Courage and Her Children & The Michigan	Yvette Pottier / –
1980	Elizabeth Franz	Sister Mary Ignatius Explains & The Actor's Nightmare	Sister Mary Ignatius / Sarah Siddons
1980	Dianne Wiest	The Art of Dining	Elizabeth Barrow Colt
1980	Madeleine le Roux	la Justice	–
1981	Meryl Streep	Alice in Concert	Alice
1981	Michele Shay	Meetings	Jean
1981	‡ Mary Beth Hurt	Crimes of the Heart	Meg MaGrath
1981	Mary McDonnell	Still Life	Cheryl
1982	Carole Shelley	Twelve Dreams	Dorothy Trowbridge
1982	Irene Worth	The Chalk Garden	Miss Madrigal
1982	Christine Estabrook	Pastorale	Rachel
1982	E. Katherine Kerr	Cloud Nine	Ellen / Mrs. Saunders
1983	Glenn Close	The Singular Life of Albert Nobbs	Albert Nobbs
1983	Christine Baranski	A Midsummer Night's Dream	Helena
1983	Ruth Maleczech	Hajj	The Woman
1984	Kathy Baker	Fool for Love	May
1984	Ruth Maleczech	Through the Leaves	Annette
1984	Pamela Reed	for sustained excellence of performance	
1984	Sheila Dabney	Sarita	Sarita
1984	Dianne Wiest	Serenading Louie & Other Places	Gabby / Deborah
1985	Laurie Metcalf	Balm in Gilead	Darlene
1985	Frances Foster	for sustained excellence of performance	
1985	Meredith Monk	for sustained excellence of performance	
1986	Norma Aleandro	About Love and Other Stories About Love	Various Characters
1986	Jill Eikenberry	Lemon Sky & Life Under Water	Ronnie / Jinkx
1986	Elizabeth Wilson	Anteroom	Fay Leland
1986	Kathryn Pogson	Aunt Dan and Lemon	Lemon
1986	Helen Stenborg	Talley & Son	Netta Talley
1986	Elisabeth Welch	Time to Start Living	Various Characters
1986	‡ Swoosie Kurtz	The House of Blue Leaves	Bananas Shaughnessy
1987	Robin Bartlett	The Early Girl	Jean
1987	Dana Ivey	Driving Miss Daisy	Daisy Werthan
1987	Laura Hicks	On the Verge	Alexandra Cafuffle
1987	Gcina Mhlope	Born in the RSA	Sindiswa
1987	Clarice Taylor	Moms	Moms Mabley
1988	Kathy Bates	Frankie and Johnny	Frankie
1988	Yvonne Bryceland	The Road to Mecca	Miss Helen
1988	Tina Shepard	The Three Lives of Lucie Cabrol	Lucie Cabrol
1988	Gordana Rashovich	A Shayna Maidel	Lusia Weiss Pechenik
1988	Lauren Tom	American Notes	Pauline
1988	Peggy Shaw	Dress Suits to Hire	Deeluxe
1988	Amy Irving	The Road to Mecca	Elsa Barlow
1989	Kathy Najimy	The Kathy and Mo Show: Parallel Lives	Various Characters
1989	Irene Worth	for sustained excellence of performance	
1989	Nancy Marchand	The Cocktail Hour	Ann
1989	Gloria Foster	The Forbidden City	Molly Hoffenburg
1989	Mo Gaffney	The Kathy and Mo Show: Parallel Lives	Various Characters

== 1990s ==
‡ – indicates the performance was also nominated for a Tony Award (any of Actress in a Play or Musical, Featured Actress in a Play or Musical) after transferring to Broadway

Year	Winners	Play / Musical	Character
1990	Lillias White	Romance in Hard Times	Hennie
1990	Mary Shultz	for sustained excellence of performance	
1990	Isabell Monk	Lear	Gloucester
1990	Jean Stapleton	The Birthday Party & Mountain Language	Meg Bowles / Elderly Woman
1990	Ruth Maleczech	Lear	Lear
1990	Danitra Vance	Spunk	Various Characters
1990	Pamala Tyson	Imperceptible Mutabilities in the Third Kingdom	Veronica / Us-seer / Aretha / Mrs. Smith
1990	Karen Evans-Kandel	Lear	Edna
1990	Marcia Jean Kurtz	The Loman Family Picnic & When She Danced	Doris Loman / Miss Belzer
1990	Elżbieta Czyżewska	Crowbar	–
1991	Kathleen Widdoes	Tower of Evil	Margaret of Burgundy
1991	Joan Copeland	The American Plan	Eva Adler
1991	Jan Leslie Harding	Sincerity Forever	Furball #2
1991	Anne Pitoniak	Pygmalion	Mrs. Higgins
1991	Jodie Markell	Machinal	The Young Woman
1991	‡ Stockard Channing	Six Degrees of Separation	Ouisa Kittredge
1991	Angela Goethals	The Good Times are Killing Me	Edna Arkins
1991	Eileen Atkins	A Room of One's Own	Virginia Woolf
1992	Lynne Thigpen	Boesman and Lena	Lena
1992	Cherry Jones	The Baltimore Waltz	Anna
1992	S. Epatha Merkerson	I'm Not Stupid	Mother
1992	Deborah Hedwall	Sight Unseen	Patricia
1992	Laura Esterman	Marvin's Room	Bessie
1992	Ofelia Gonzales	for sustained excellence of performance	
1992	Randy Danson	for sustained excellence of performance	
1992	Anna Deavere Smith	Fires in the Mirror	Various Characters
1993	‡ Jane Alexander	The Sisters Rosensweig	Sara Goode
1993	Míriam Colón	for sustained excellence of performance	
1993	Frances Conroy	The Last Yankee	Patricia Hamilton
1993	Hallie Foote	Nightingale & Spring Dance	Annie Gayle Long
1993	Ellen Parker	for sustained excellence of performance	
1993	Linda Stephens	Wings	Emily Stilson
1994	Myra Carter	Three Tall Women	A
1994	Judith Ivey	The Moonshot Tape	Diane
1994	Holly Hughes	for sustained excellence of performance	
1994	Alice Playten	First Lady Suite	Mamie Eisenhower / Lady Bird Johnson
1994	Carolee Carmello	Hello Again	The Young Wife
1994	‡ Anna Deavere Smith	Twilight: Los Angeles, 1992	Various Characters
1994	Gail Grate	The America Play	Lucy
1994	Claudia Shear	Blown Sideways Through Life	Various Characters
1995	Mary Beth Peil	The Naked Truth & A Cheever Evening & Missing Persons	Nan Bemiss / Various Characters / Addie Pencke
1995	Linda Lavin	Hotline & Central Park West	Dorothy / Carol
1995	Kristine Nielsen	Dog Opera	Madeline Newell
1995	Eileen Atkins	Vita and Virginia	Virginia Woolf
1995	Barbara Eda-Young	Slavs!	Mrs. Domik / First Babushka
1995	Felicity Huffman	The Cryptogram	Donny
1995	Joanna Adler	The Boys in the Basement	–
1995	Camryn Manheim	Missing Persons	Gemma Calabrese
1995	Vanessa Redgrave	Vita and Virginia	Vita Sackville-West
1996	Mary Louise Wilson	Full Gallop	Diana Vreeland
1996	Uta Hagen	for sustained excellence of performance	
1996	Terri Klausner	Bed and Sofa	Ludmilla
1996	Adina Porter	Venus	Mrs. Sartje Baartman / The Venus Hottentot
1996	Lisa Gay Hamilton	Valley Song	Veronica Jonkers
1996	Virginia Rambal	The Elf Lady & Troy of America	Angela / -
1996	Kathleen Chalfant	for sustained excellence of performance	
1996	Marty Pottenger	City Water Tunnel #3	Various Characters
1997	Karen Evans-Kandel	Peter and Wendy	The Narrator
1997	Mary-Louise Parker	How I Learned to Drive	Li'l Bit
1997	Tsai Chin	Golden Child	Eng Siu-Yong
1997	Jennifer Dundas	Good as New	Maggie
1997	Sharon Scruggs	The Trojan Women	Cassandra
1997	Ching Valdes-Aran	Flipzoids	Aying
1997	Joanne Camp	for sustained excellence of performance	
1998	Adriane Lenox	Dinah Was	Mama Jones
1998	‡ Marie Mullen	The Beauty Queen of Leenane	Maureen Folan
1998	J. Smith-Cameron	As Bees In Honey Drown	Alexa Vere de Vere
1998	Lea DeLaria	On the Town	Hildy Esterhazy
1998	Yvette Freeman	Dinah Was	Dinah Washington
1998	Elizabeth Marvel	Misalliance & Thérèse Raquin	Lina Szczepanowska / Thérèse Raquin
1998	Mary Testa	On the Town	‡ Madame Maude P. Dilly
1998	Mary Testa	& From Above	Roz
1998	Kate Valk	for sustained excellence of performance	
1998	Joan MacIntosh	More Stately Mansions	Deborah Harford
1998	Heather Gillespie	Mamba's Daughters	Hagar
1998	Karen Finley	The American Chestnut	Various Characters
1999	Kristine Nielsen	Betty's Summer Vacation	Mrs. Siezmagraff
1999	Swoosie Kurtz	The Mineola Twins	Myra / Myrna
1999	Kathleen Chalfant	Wit	Vivian Bearing
1999	Viola Davis	Everybody's Ruby	Ruby McCollum
1999	Mina Bern	for sustained excellence of performance	
1999	Peggy Shaw	Menopausal Gentleman	Various Characters
1999	Carmelita Tropicana	for sustained excellence of performance	
1999	Lisa Kron	2.5 Minute Ride	Lisa

== 2000s ==
‡ – indicates the performance was also nominated for a Tony Award (any of Actress in a Play or Musical, Featured Actress in a Play or Musical) after transferring to Broadway

Year	Winners	Play / Musical	Character
2000	Eileen Heckart	The Waverly Gallery	Gladys Green
2000	Debra Monk	The Time of the Cuckoo	Leona Samish
2000	Cynthia Hopkins	Another Telepathic Thing	The Narrator
2000	Elizabeth Marvel	A Streetcar Named Desire	Blanche Dubois
2000	Lynne Thigpen	Jar the Floor	Lola
2000	Charlayne Woodard	In the Blood	Hester
2000	Lola Pashalinski	Gertrude and Alice	Gertrude Stein
2000	Deb Margolin	for sustained excellence of performance	
2000	Dominique Dibbell	Jet Lag	Lincoln
2001	‡ Mary-Louise Parker	Proof	Catherine
2001	Pamela Isaacs	Newyorkers	Various Characters
2001	Jackie Hoffman	The Book of Liz	Various Characters
2001	Janie Dee	Comic Potential	Jacie Triplethree
2001	Stephanie Berry	The Shaneequa Chronicles	Shaneequa
2001	Marian Seldes	for sustained excellence of performance	
2002	‡ Elaine Stritch	Elaine Stritch At Liberty	Elaine
2002	Martha Plimpton	Hobson's Choice	Maggie Hobson
2002	Yvette Ganier	Breath, Boom	Prix
2002	Linda Emond	Homebody/Kabul	The Homebody
2002	Juliana Francis	Maria del Bosco	Maria
2003	Rosemary Harris	All Over	The Wife
2003	‡ Fiona Shaw	Medea	Medea
2004	‡ Jayne Houdyshell	Well	Ann Kron
2004	Viola Davis	Intimate Apparel	Esther
2004	Lili Taylor	Aunt Dan and Lemon	Lemon
2004	Zilah Mendoza	Living Out	Ana Hernandez
2004	‡ Tonya Pinkins	Caroline, or Change	Caroline Thibodeaux
2004	‡ Sarah Jones	Bridge and Tunnel	Various Characters
2004	Lisa Emery	Iron	Fay
2004	Maude Mitchell	Maybou Mines DollHouse	Nora Helmer
2005	Elizabeth Marvel	Hedda Gabler	Hedda Gabler
2005	Rosemary Allen	Good Samaritans	Rosemary
2005	Mercedes Ruehl	Woman Before a Glass	Peggy Guggenheim
2005	‡ Cherry Jones	Doubt	Sister Aloysius Beauvier
2005	Deirdre O'Connell	for sustained excellence of performance	
2005	Vivienne Benesch	Going to St. Ives	Cora Gage
2005	LaChanze	Dessa Rose	Dessa Rose
2005	L. Scott Caldwell	Going to St. Ives	Mary N'Kame
2006	Lois Smith	The Trip to Bountiful	Carrie Watts
2006	Sherie Rene Scott	Landscape of the Body	Rosalie
2006	‡ Julie White	The Little Dog Laughed	Diane
2006	Dana Ivey	Mrs. Warren's Profession	Kitty Warren
2006	‡ Christine Ebersole	Grey Gardens	Edith Bouvier Beale
2006	Meg MacCary	What Then	Diane
2006	S. Epatha Merkerson	Birdie Blue	Birdie Blue
2006	Marin Ireland	Cyclone	Erin
2007	Roslyn Ruff	Seven Guitars	Vera
2007	Nina Hellman	Trouble in Paradise	Lily
2007	Betsy Aidem	for sustained excellence of performance	
2007	Nancy Opel	My Deah	My Deah Hedgepeth / Lillie V
2007	Donna Lynne Champlin	The Dark at the Top of the Stairs	Cora Flood
2007	Nilaja Sun	No Child	Various Characters
2008	Veanne Cox	for sustained excellence of performance	
2008	Rebecca Wisocky	Amazons and Their Men	The Frau
2008	Lisa Gay Hamilton	Ohio State Murders	Suzanne Alexander
2008	Kate Mulgrew	Iphigenia 2.o	Clytemnestra
2008	Heidi Schreck	Drum of the Waves of Horikawa	Various Characters
2009	Birgit Huppuch	Telephone	Miss St
2009	Quincy Tyler Bernstine	Ruined	Salima
2009	Saidah Arrika Ekulona	Ruined	Mama Nadi

== 2010s ==
‡ – indicates the performance was also nominated for a Tony Award (any of Actress in a Play or Musical, Featured Actress in a Play or Musical) after transferring to Broadway

Year	Winners	Play / Musical	Character
2010	Laurie Metcalf	A Lie of the Mind	Meg
2010	Juliet Rylance	As You Like It	Rosalind
2011	Brenda Wehle	The Intelligent Homosexual's Guide To...	Clio
2011	Charlayne Woodard	The Witch of Edmonton	Elizabeth Sawyer
2011	‡ Laurie Metcalf	The Other Place	Juliana
2012	Cherise Booth	Milk Like Sugar	Talisha
2012	Mary Louise Wilson	4000 Miles	Vera Joseph
2012	‡ Linda Lavin	The Lyons	Rita Lyons
2012	Susan Parfour	Tribes	Sylvia
2013	Lois Smith	for sustained excellence of performance	
2013	Frances Sternhagen	for sustained excellence of performance	
2013	Eisa Davis	for sustained excellence of performance	
2014	Estelle Parsons	for sustained excellence of performance	
2014	Johanna Day	Appropriate	Antoinette 'Toni' Lafayette
2014	Marylouise Burke	for sustained excellence of performance	
2014	‡ Sydney Lucas	Fun Home	Small Allison Bechdel
2014	Mia Katigbak	Awake and Sing!	Bessie Berger
2015	Brooke Bloom	You Got Older	Mae
2015	April Matthis	for sustained excellence of performance	
2016	Emily Donahoe	The Christians	Jenny
2016	Georgia Engel	John	Mertis Katherine Graven
2016	‡ Jayne Houdyshell	The Humans	Deirdre Blake
2016	Tamara Tunie	Familiar	Marvelous
2017	Kecia Lewis	Marie and Rosetta	Sister Rosetta Tharpe
2017	Heather MacRae	Come Back, Little Sheba	Lola Delaney
2017	Amy Ryan	Love, Love, Love	Sandra
2018	Carrie Coon	Mary Jane	Mary Jane
2018	Dame-Jasmine Hughes	Is God Is	Racine
2018	Denise Gough	People, Places & Things	Emma
2018	Jessica Hecht	Admissions	Sherri Rosen-Mason
2019	Cherise Booth	Fabulation, or the Re-Education of Undine	Undine Barnes Calles
2019	Heather Simms	Fabulation, or the Re-Education of Undine	Grandma / Caseworker / Inmate / Dr.Khdair
2019	Mia Barron	Hurricane Diane	Carol Fleischer
2019	Quincy Tyler Bernstine	for sustained excellence of performance	

== 2020s ==
Year	Winners	Play / Musical	Character
2020	April Mathis	Toni Stone	Toni Stone
2020	Deirdre O'Connell	Dana H.	Dana Higginbotham
2020	Emily Davis	Is This A Room	Reality Winner
2020	Elizabeth Rodriguez	Halfway Bitches Go Straight to Heaven	Miss Rivera
2020	Liza Colón-Zayas	Halfway Bitches Go Straight to Heaven	Sarge
2020	Vinie Burrows	for sustained excellence of performance	
2021	Not presented due to extended closing of theatre productions during COVID-19 pandemic		
2022	Stephanie Berry	On Sugarland	Evelyn
2022	Brittany Bradford	Wedding Band	Julia Augustine
2022	Kara Young	Twelfth Night	Viola
2022	Lizan Mitchell	On Sugarland	Tisha
2022	Andrea Patterson	Cullud Wattah	Ainee
2023	Maryann Plunkett	Deep Blue Sound	Ella
2023	Zuleyma Guevara	Sancocho	Caridad
2023	Marla Mindelle	Titanique	Celine Dion
2023	Shannon Tyo	The Comeuppance	Kristina
2023	Peggy Shaw	for sustained excellence of performance	
2023	Lois Weaver	for sustained excellence of performance	
2023	Nadine Malouf	Montag	Novella
2023	Ariana Venturi	Montag	Faith
2024	Gabby Beans	Jonah	Ana
2024	Dianne Wiest	Scene Partners	Meryl Kowalski
2024	Johanna Day	Scene Partners	Charlize
2025	Bulbul Chakraborty	Rheology	Herself
2025	Quincy Tyler Bernstine	Well, I'll Let You Go	Maggie
2025	Crystal Lucas-Perry	Pericles	Gower
2025	Stephanie Weeks	Show/Boat: A River	Julie

== Winners of more than one award ==
Shown in order of receiving latest award.

=== 3 Wins ===
- Gloria Foster
- Marian Seldes
- Dianne Wiest
- Ruth Maleczech
- Swoosie Kurtz
- Elizabeth Wilson
- Laurie Metcalf
- Lola Pashalinski
- Elizabeth Marvel
- Rosemary Harris
- Frances Sternhagen

=== 2 Wins ===
- April Mathis
- Cherise Booth
- Viola Davis
- Deirdre O'Connell
- Cherry Jones
- Kathleen Widdoes
- Johanna Day
- Nancy Marchand
- Peggy Shaw
- Alice Playten
- Irene Worth
- Charlayne Woodard
- Kristine Nielsen
- Joan MacIntosh
- S. Epatha Merkerson
- Linda Lavin
- Anna Deavere Smith
- Eileen Atkins
- Mary Louise Wilson
- Karen Evans-Kandel
- Nancy Wickwire
- Priscilla Smith
- Mari Gorman
- Anne Meacham
- Estelle Parsons
- Pamela Payton-Wright
- Lois Smith
- Roberta Maxwell
- Sada Thompson
- Dana Ivey
- Lynne Thigpen
- Kathleen Chalfant
- Mary-Louise Parker
- Julie Bovasso
- Lisa Gay Hamilton
- Jayne Houdyshell
