= Dress Suits to Hire =

Play written by Holly Hughes

- Original language: English
- Written by: Holly Hughes
- Characters: Michigan; Deeluxe; Little Peter
- Genre: Pulp Fiction; Film Noir; Feminist Theatre
- Setting: A dress shop

Premiere
- Date: 1987
- Place: Performance Space 122, New York, New York

Dress Suits to Hire is a play written by Holly Hughes and originally performed by the Lesbian and Feminist performance group, Split Britches. It premiered in 1987 at Performance Space 122 in Manhattan's East Village. The play is essentially a lesbian love story told in the overheated style of film noir, also drawing upon images from pulp fiction; The show has been revived several times since its premiere, with the original cast of Peggy Shaw (Deeluxe/Little Richard) and Lois Weaver (Michigan) reprising their roles. The show won OBIE Awards for both Shaw and Hughes (Shaw for her performance in the original 1987 production and a special citation for Hughes for the 1993 revival).

== Summary ==
Described as a "lesbian noir" piece, Dress Suits tells all about two women, Deeluxe and Michigan, who are shacking up in the lobby of a clothing rental shop in the East Village. As the action begins, the more butch partner, Deeluxe (Peggy Shaw), slips on a pair of nylon stockings while singing a love song in a husky baritone. She wears gender roles as one might put on a shirt, seeming equally comfortable in a button-down item or a camisole. Moments later, she asphyxiates herself with her right arm, but this becomes only a minor obstacle; even death is but a costume for these women. (Incidentally, the aforementioned arm develops into its own character named "Little Peter" later in the play.). The show's heated fantasies, brassy broads and sexual charades make for a carnivorous free-for-all.

== Characters ==
Michigan

Deeluxe

Little Peter a mysterious Italian bully who sometimes possesses Deeluxe's right hand. An abusive sock puppet without the sock.

== Setting ==
The show takes place entirely in a rental-clothing store on Second Avenue.

== Themes ==
Feminism, LGBT Drama, Lesbian Drama, Film Noir, Pulp Fiction

== Reception ==
When the play opened in May 1987 at P.S. 122 in New York City, C. Carr of the Village Voice heralded Hughes as queen of her own “Dyke Noir Theatre” and broadcast her reputation as bad girl of the bad girls. “She’s hell on heels, a twisted sister— a character from the timeless, tasteless world of dyke noir as imagined by Holly Hughes.”

"While Ms. Hughes's more poetic writing recalls Sam Shepard, the campy B-movie side of her sensibility shows her to be equally in tune with John Waters's movies and Charles Busch's drag extravaganzas. ''Dress Suits to Hire'' lacks the pacing, suspense and structure of ''Fool for Love,'' the Shepard play it most closely resembles. But in portraying female sexuality - and lesbian seduction in particular - as a carnivorous free-for-all, it scrapes away decades of encrusted decorum from a subject that is too often treated with a hushed sentimentality." – Stephen Holden of the New York Times, reviewing the Interart Theatre production

"The energetic sharpness and tension that must have been present in the original production seemed lacking. Perhaps this resulted from the cavernous Annex, which felt more like a barn than a typical theatrical space. Dress Suits thrives on the suffocating and empowering nature of intimacy, both between its two characters and with the audience. Thus, the La MaMa production may have been most successful as a revival rather than as an isolated show. Dress Suits to Hire allowed the audience to revisit and contrast the value of lesbian performance art against a vastly different historical moment. What remained most provocative was seeing what used to be a hotly debated, boundary-pushing piece now revisited as a seminal work of performance art." –Gwendolyn Alker of NYU on the 2005 Revival.

"The writing displays an almost hypnotic fascination with language; every page is loaded with double-entendres and florid prose." –Adam Klasfeld of Theatre Mania.

"Both performers interlace motivations, curiosities, and dense meaning with intense power and ease. Weaver and Shaw irritate the nerves as a theatrical device for presenting or awakening the dormant, suppressed, or ignored aspects of the process of engendering our lives. At times, the show seems unattainable, mysterious, and almost impossible to understand. Something beyond words happens; performance shows us so much about ourselves without opening mouths. What linger are images of women hungry and at play; they are dangerous women-monsters, whose threat is nothing more than the act of becoming free. The straps and zippers, ties and belts, jackets and skirts, define and determine who we are. What happens when we rent clothing to experience a brief encounter with the other side? Who tells us what to wear and how to put it on? These questions are the core to this strikingly dicey play." –Heather Barfield Cole of The Austin Chronicle

== Productions ==
- Premiere: 1987: Performance Space 122. Directed by Lois Weaver.
- 1987–88: Interart Theatre.
- 1993: Exile, Santa Fe, New Mexico.
- 2005: La MaMa Experimental Theatre Club.
