= Obie Award =

Annual theater awards in New York City

Obie Awards
- Awarded for: Excellence in Off-Broadway theatre
- Location: New York City, New York
- Country: United States
- Presented by: The Village Voice (1956–2020); American Theatre Wing (2014–present)
- First award: 1956; 70 years ago
- Website: obieawards.com

The Obie Awards or Off-Broadway Theater Awards are annual awards given to theater artists and groups involved in off-Broadway and off-off-Broadway productions in New York City. The Obie Awards are considered off-Broadway's highest honor, similar to the Tony Awards for Broadway productions. The awards were presented by The Village Voice from 1956 to 2020, and have been presented by the American Theatre Wing since 2014.

== Background ==
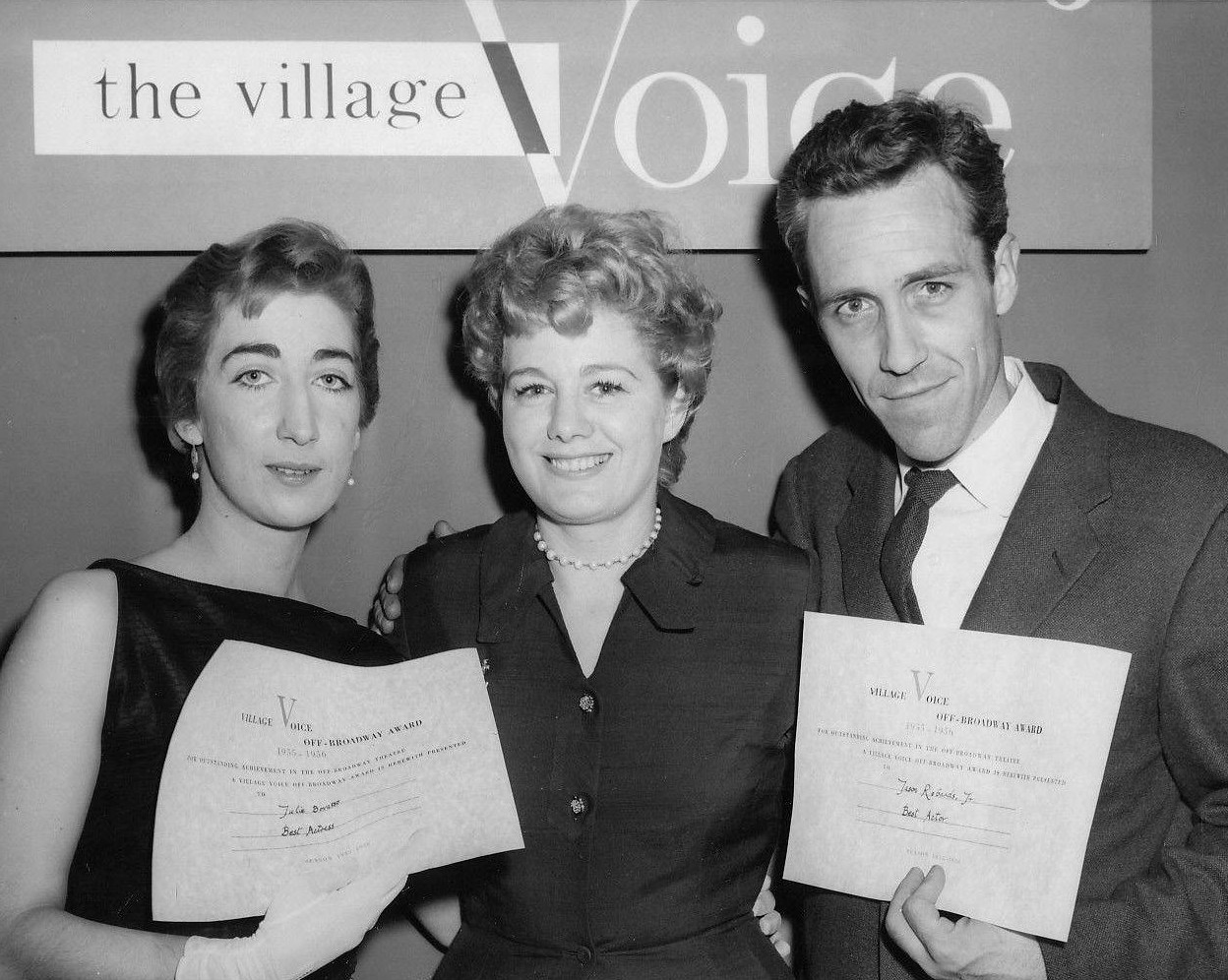
Julie Bovasso, Shelley Winters and Jason Robards at the first Obie Awards (1956)

The Obie Awards were initiated by critic Jerry Tallmer and Edwin (Ed) Fancher, publisher of The Village Voice, who handled the financing and business side of the project. They were first given in 1956 under the direction of Tallmer. Initially, only off-Broadway productions were eligible; in 1964, off-off-Broadway productions were made eligible. The first Obie Awards ceremony was held at Helen Gee's cafe.

With the exception of the Lifetime Achievement and Best New American Play awards, there are no fixed categories at the Obie Awards, and the winning actors and actresses are all in a single category titled "Performance." There are no announced nominations. Awards in the past have included performance, direction, best production, design, special citations, and sustained achievement. Not every category is awarded every year. The Village Voice also awards annual Obie grants to selected companies; in 2011, these grants were $2,000 each to Metropolitan Playhouse and Wakka Wakka Productions. There is also a Ross Wetzsteon Grant, named after its former theater editor, in the amount of $2,000 (in 2009; in 2011 the grant was $1,000), for a theatre that nurtures innovative new plays.

The first awards in 1955-1956 for plays and musicals were given to Absalom (Lionel Abel) as Best New Play, Uncle Vanya, Best All-Around Production and The Threepenny Opera as Best Musical.

In September 2014, the American Theatre Wing joined the Village Voice as co-presenters, with the Wing having "overall responsibility for running" the Awards. In 2021, the Wing took over as sole presenter of the Obie Awards.

== Award categories ==
- Outstanding New Play
- Distinguished Performance
- Distinguished Playwriting
- Distinguished Directing
- Distinguished Design
- Sustained Achievement in Theatre
- Sustained Achievement in Directing
- Sustained Achievement in Performance
- Sustained Achievement in Design
- Special Citations
  - Lifetime Achievement
  - Ross Wetzsteon Award
  - Michael Feingold Award
  - Morgan Jenness Award

=== Retired categories ===
- Distinguished Performance by an Actress
- Distinguished Performance by an Actor
- Distinguished Performance by an Ensemble
- Best Musical

== Ceremony history ==
Year	Host	Venue	Presenters
1956	Shelley Winters	Limelight Cafe	
1957	Geraldine Page	[Limelight Cafe]	
1958	Maureen Stapleton	[Limelight Cafe]	
1959	Kim Stanley	Village Gate	
1960	Anne Bancroft	Village Gate	
1961	Julie Harris	Village Gate	
1962	Lotte Lenya	Village Gate	
1963	Uta Hagen	Village Gate	
1964	Colleen Dewhurst	Village Gate	
1965	Gloria Foster	Village Gate	
1966	Anne Jackson	Village Gate	
1967	Barbara Harris	Village Gate	
1968	Estelle Parsons	Village Gate	
1969	Julie Bovasso	Village Gate	
1970	Dustin Hoffman	Village Gate	
1971	Elaine May	Village Gate	
1972	Groucho Marx	Village Gate	
1973	Sylvia Miles	unknown venue	
1974	Madeleine Le Roux	unknown venue	
1975	Godfrey Cambridge	Village Gate	
1976	no formal host	Lincoln Center	
1977	Paul Sorvino, Gilda Radner, Marilyn Sokol	The Bottom Line	
1978	Dustin Hoffman	The Bottom Line	
1979	Ron Leibman	The Bottom Line	
1980	no formal host	Roxy NYC	
1981	Kevin Kline, Sigourney Weaver	Roxy NYC	
1982	Swoosie Kurtz, Tommy Tune	Savoy	
1983	Harvey Fierstein, Julie Bovasso	First City Cabaret	
1984	no formal host	Cat Club	
1985	Ellen Stewart, Harvey Fierstein	Puck Building	
1986	Christopher Durang, Swoozie Kurtz	unknown venue	
1987	Morgan Freeman, Christine Lahti	unknown venue	
1988	Morgan Freeman, Lee Breuer	unknown venue	
1989	no formal host	unknown venue	
1990	Julie Bovasso, Olympia Dukakis	unknown venue	
1991	Stockard Channing, Alan Arkin	Palladium Ballroom	
1992	Jerry Zaks, Kate Nelligan	Palladium Ballroom	
1993	no formal host	unknown venue	
1994	Mary McDonnell, James McDaniel	unknown venue	
1995	Hector Elizondo, Anne Meara	unknown venue	
1996	Nicky Silver	unknown venue	
1997	no formal host	unknown venue	Fyvush Finkel, Kathleen Chalfant, Lisa Gay Hamilton, Peter Francis James, Shirley Knight, Camryn Manheim, Mary Louise Parker, Roger Guenveur Smith, Julie Taymor, Marisa Tomei, Rip Torn, Ming Cho Lee, Karin Coonrod, and Scott Elliot
1998	Eric Bogosian, Kristen Johnson	Webster Hall	Danny Hoch, Woodie King Jr., Mac Wellman, Mary Louise Wilson, Lea DeLaria, Ellie Covan, Tsai Chin, Greg Germann, and Liz Diamond
1999	Lea DeLaria, Paul Rudnick	Webster Hall	Betty Buckley, Kathleen Chalfant, Stephen DeRosa, David Henry Hwang, Swoosie Kurtz, Elizabeth Marvel, John Cameron Mitchell, Everett Quinton, Phylicia Rashad, and Roger Rees
2000	Claudia Shear, Mary Testa	Webster Hall	Ping Chong, Felicity Huffman, William H. Macy, Cynthia Nixon, Frances Sternhagen, Mary Testa, Carmelita Tropicana, James Urbaniak
2001	Brian Murray, Marian Seldes	Webster Hall	Darius De Haas, David Gallo, Linda Lavin, Marion McClinton, Debra Monk, Mark Russell, J. Smith-Cameron, and Daphne Rubin-Vega
2002	Karen Evans Kandel, Ruben Santiago-Hudson	Webster Hall	Elizabeth Franz, Mary Louise Parker, Ellen McLaughlin, Rinde Eckert, Richard Maxwell, Suzan-Lori Parks, and George C. Wolfe
2003	Bill Irwin, Charlayne Woodard	Webster Hall	Edward Albee, Linda Emond, Juliana Francis, Martha Plimpton, Jackie Hoffman, Eddie Izzard, John Ortiz, and Liev Schreiber
2004	Swoosie Kurtz, Raul Esparza	Webster Hall	Viola Davis, Idina Menzel, Taye Diggs, and Denis O'Hare
2005	Stockard Channing, Brian F. O'Byrne	Webster Hall	Elaine Stritch and Frances Sternhagen
2006	Lili Taylor, Eric Bogosian	Skirball Center for the Performing Arts	Christine Lahti, Christine Ebersole, Edward Hibbert, Douglas Carter Beane, Phylicia Rashad, and Oskar Eustis
2007	Cynthia Nixon, T.R. Knight	Skirball Center for the Performing Arts	Michael Cerveris, Angela Lansbury, William Ivey Long, Camryn Manheim, Stephanie March, Terrence McNally, Liev Schreiber, and Anika Noni Rose
2008	Elizabeth Marvel, Bill Camp	Webster Hall	Jonathan Groff, Priscilla Lopez, S. Epatha Merkerson, Marisa Tomei, Julie White and Bradley Whitford
2009	Daniel Breaker, Martha Plimpton	Webster Hall	Anne Hathaway, Brian d'Arcy James, Gavin Creel, John Shea, Karen Olivo, Kate Mulgrew, Marc Kudisch, and Nilaja Sun
2010	Anika Noni-Rose and Michael Cerveris	Webster Hall	J. Smith-Cameron, Marin Ireland, Linda Lavin, Hamish Linklater, Michael Shannon and Jennifer Westfeldt
2011	S. Epatha Merkerson and David Hyde Pierce	Webster Hall	Nina Arianda, Alec Baldwin, Margaret Colin, Mamie Gummer, Rose Hemingway, John Larroquette, Patina Miller, Lin-Manuel Miranda, Arian Moayed, Jim Parsons, Andrew Rannells, Liev Schreiber, and Frank Wood
2012	no formal host	Webster Hall	Eric McCormack, Grace Gummer, Hugh Dancy, Jonathan Pryce, Justin Bartha, Leslie Odom Jr., Lily Rabe, Michael McKean, Tonya Pinkins, Topher Grace, and Tracee Chimo
2013	Jessica Hecht and Jeremy Shamos	Webster Hall	Bobby Cannavale, Tracee Chimo, Cyndi Lauper, Judith Light, Krysta Rodriguez, Duncan Sheik, Meryl Streep, and Courtney B. Vance
2014	Tamara Tunie and Hamish Linklater	Webster Hall	Betsy Aidem, Harvey Fierstein, Lena Hall, LaTanya Richardson Jackson, Andy Karl, David Bar Katz, Cristin Milioti, Kelli O'Hara, Lily Rabe, and Stephen Trask
2015	Lea DeLaria	Webster Hall	Sting, Jessie Eisenberg, Stockard Channing, Billy Crudup, Tony Kushner, Lisa Kron, and William Ivey Long
2016	Lea DeLaria	Webster Hall	Savion Glover, Elizabeth Marvel, Colman Domingo, Danai Gurira, Tovah Feldshuh, Lisa Kron, Maura Tierney, Kate Burton, Carrie Preston, Norm Lewis, and Marlo Thomas
2017	Lea DeLaria	Webster Hall	Chris Cooper, Rose Byrne, Benj Pasek and Justin Paul, Jayne Houdyshell, Lena Hall, Jefferson Mays, LaChanze, Daphne Rubin-Vega, Taylor Mac, Darius de Haas, Mike Faist, J. Smith-Cameron, David Henry Hwang, Derek McLane, William Ivey Long, Emilio Sosa, Peter Barbey
2018	John Leguizamo	Terminal 5	Andrew Garfield, Lucy Liu, Matthew Broderick, Oliver Platt, Laura Benanti, Laura Osnes, Beth Malone, David Morse, Itamar Moses, Arian Moayed, Stephen Trask, Gideon Glick, Rebecca Taichman, William Ivey Long, Natasha Katz, David Henry Hwang, David Zinn, Emilio Sosa, Lilli Cooper, Pixie Aventura, Heather Hitchens, Peter Barbey, Michael Feingold
2019	Rachel Bloom	Terminal 5	Eric Bogosian, Julie White, Kristine Nielsen, Beowulf Boritt, Patti LuPone, Lily Rabe, Hamish Linklater, Heather Hitchens, David Henry Hwang, Billy Crudup, Margo Seibert, Michael John LaChiusa, Liesl Tommy, Damon Daunno, Rachel Chavkin, Rebecca Taichman, Luke Cresswell, Riccardo Hernandez, Mimi Lien, Marc Kudisch
2020	Cole Escola	YouTube (virtual, due to COVID-19)	Clint Ramos, Craig Lucas, Cynthia Erivo, Dominique Morisseau, Eisa Davis, Emilio Sosa, Heather Hitchens, Heidi Schreck, Katrina Lenk, LaTanya Richardson Jackson, Liesl Tommy, Malcolm Gets, Rachel Chavkin, Rachel Hauck, Sahr Ngaujah, Sam Pinkleton, Saycon Sengbloh
~~2021~~	due to the COVID-19 pandemic in New York City, the 66th Obie Awards were not held until 2023, collectively honouring productions of the 2020–21, 2021–22 and 2022–23 theater seasons		
~~2022~~	due to the COVID-19 pandemic in New York City, the 66th Obie Awards were not held until 2023, collectively honouring productions of the 2020–21, 2021–22 and 2022–23 theater seasons		
2023	Crystal Lucas-Perry	Terminal 5	Emilio Sosa, Heather Hitchens, J. Allen Suddeth, Melissa Rose Bernardo, David Mendizábal, Rachel Chavkin,
2024	Kara Young and Frank DiLella	NY1	Presented on Air by Hosts
2025	Marla Mindelle, Ryan J. Haddad and Frank DiLella	NY1	Presented on Air by Hosts
2026	Michael Urie and Frank DiLella	NY1	Presented on Air by Hosts

== Notable winners ==
=== 2000s ===
Year	Recipients
2000	Cynthia Hopkins (Performance - Another Telepathic Thing); Byron Jennings (Performance Award - Waste); Maria Irene Fornes (Special Citation - Letters From Cuba); Susan Hilferty (Sustained Excellence in Costume Design)
2001	Brian d'Arcy James (Performance Award - The Good Thief); Ruben Santiago-Hudson (Special Citation - Lackawanna Blues); Justin Vivian Bond (Special Citation - Kiki and Herb: Jesus Wept); Kirsten Childs (Music and Lyrics Award - The Bubbly Black Girl Sheds Her Chameleon Skin); Neil Patel (Design Award - War of the Worlds, Resident Alien, Race, I Will Bear Witness); José Rivera (Playwrighting Award - References To Salvador Dali Make Me Hot)
2002	Kevin Adams (Sustained Excellence in Lighting Design); Tony Kushner (Playwrighting Award - Homebody/Kabul); Caryl Churchill; Charles L. Mee
2003	Mac Wellman (Lifetime Achievement Award); Mos Def (Performance Award - Fucking A); Fiona Shaw (Performance - Medea); Edward Norton (Performance - Burn This); Denis O'Hare (Performance Award - Take Me Out); Christine Ebersole (Performance Award - Talking Heads); Kenneth Posner (Sustained Excellence in Lighting Design); David Greenspan (Special Citation - She Stoops to Comedy)
2004	Derek McLane; Moises Kaufman (Directing Award - I am My Own Wife); Viola Davis (Performance Award - Intimate Apparel); Sarah Jones (Performance Award - Bridge & Tunnel); Jefferson Mays (Performance Award - I am My Own Wife); Tony Kushner (Special Citation - Caroline, or Change); Jeanine Tesori (Special Citation - Caroline, or Change); Alex Timbers (Special Citation - A Very Merry Unauthorized Children's Scientology Pageant)
2005	LaChanze (Performance Award - Dessa Rose); Cherry Jones (Performance Award - Doubt); Deirdre O'Connell (Sustained Excellence in Performance Award); Rui Rita (Design Award - Engaged); Caryl Churchill (Playwrighting Award - A Number); Lynn Nottage (Playwriting Award - Fabulation); Ivo van Hove (Directing Award - Hedda Gabler)
2006	Dana Ivey (Performance Award - Mrs. Warren's Profession); Christine Ebersole (Performance Award - Grey Gardens); Allen Moyer (Sustained Excellence of Set Design); Robert O'Hara (Special Citation - In the Continuum); Danai Gurira (Special Citation - In the Continuum); Adam Rapp (Special Citation - Red Light Winter)
2007	Young Jean Lee (Obie Grant Award); Lin-Manuel Miranda (Music and Lyrics Award - In the Heights); Beowulf Boritt (Sustained Excellence in Set Design); Anne Kauffman
2008	Adrienne Kennedy (Lifetime Achievement Award); Annie Dorsen (Best New Theatre Piece - Passing Strange); Kate Mulgrew (Performance Award - Iphigenia 2.0); Jane Greenwood (Sustained Excellence of Costume Design Award); David Henry Hwang (Playwrighting Award - Yellow Face
2009	Lynn Nottage (Best American Play - Ruined); Stephen Sondheim (Music and Lyrics Award - Road Show); Jonathan Groff (Performance Award - Prayer for my Enemy)

=== 2010s ===
Year	Recipients	Ref.
2010	Sam Gold (Directing Award - Circle Mirror Transformation, The Alien); Reed Birney (Performance Award - Circle Mirror Transformation)	
2011	Laurie Metcalf (Performance Award - The Other Place); Leigh Silverman (Directing Award - In the Wake, Go Back to Where You Are)	
2012	Steven Hoggett, Martin Lowe, John Tiffany (Special Citations - Once); Jim Fletcher (Sustained Excellence in Performance); Mimi Lien (Set Design Award); Erin Courtney (Special Citation - A Map of Virtue)	
2013	Dave Malloy and Rachel Chavkin (Special Citations - Natasha, Pierre, and the Great Comet of 1812); Annie Baker (Playwriting Award - The Flick)	
2014	Sydney Lucas (Performance Award - Fun Home); Sonya Tayeh (Choreography Award)	
2015	Lin-Manuel Miranda, Alex Lacamoire, Thomas Kail, Andy Blankenbuehler (Best New American Theatre Work - Hamilton)	
2016	Steven Levenson, Benj Pasek, Justin Paul (Musical Theatre Award - Dear Evan Hansen); Ben Platt (Performance Award); Lupita Nyong'o (Performance Award)	
2017	Lynn Nottage (Playwriting Award - Sweat); J.T. Rogers (Playwriting Award - Oslo); Matthew Broderick (Performance Award); Michael Urie (Performance Award)	
2018	Rajiv Joseph (Best New American Play-Describe the Night); Will Swenson (Performance Award); Jessica Hecht (Performance Award); Ben Edelman (Performance Award); Billy Crudup (Performance Award); Donald Holder (Lighting Design Award)	
2019	Heidi Schreck (Best New American Play - What the Constitution Means to Me); Daniel Fish, John Heginbotham, Daniel Kluger, Laura Jellinek, Terese Wadden, Scott Zielinski, Drew Levy, Joshua Thorson (Special Citations-Oklahoma!)	

=== 2020s ===
Year	Recipients	Ref.
2020	Writing: Will Arbery (Heroes of the Fourth Turning); Michael R. Jackson (A Strange Loop); Haruna Lee (Suicide Forest); Directing: JoAnne Akalaitis (MUD/Drowning); Kenny Leon (Much Ado About Nothing); Whitney White (Our Dear Dead Drug Lord); Les Waters for Sustained Excellence in Direction; Performance: Liza Colón-Zayas and Elizabeth Rodriguez (Halfway Bitches Go Straight to Heaven); Emily Davis (Is This A Room); Edmund Donovan (Greater Clements); April Matthis (Toni Stone); Joe Ngo (Cambodian Rock Band); Deirdre O'Connell (Dana H.); Design: Yu-Hsuan Chen - set design (Our Dear Dead Drug Lord); Mikhail Fiksel - sound design (Dana H. and Cambodian Rock Band); Andrea Hood - costume design (Public Works); Arnulfo Maldonado for Sustained Excellence in Set Design; Jen Schriever for Sustained Excellence in Lighting Design; Choreography: Camille A. Brown for Sustained Excellence in Choreography; Institutional Recognition: National Black Theatre for sustained excellence in production and continued advocacy on behalf of Black artists; Page 73 for providing extraordinary support for early career playwrights; The Tank for providing extraordinary support for emerging artists; Special Citations: Entire creative team and ensemble of Heroes of the Fourth Turning; Entire creative team and ensemble of A Strange Loop; David Cale for the writing and performance of We're Only Alive For A Short Amount of Time; Dave Malloy, Or Matias and Hidenori Nakajo for their collaboration on the music and sound of Octet; David Neumann and Marcella Murray for creation and performance of Distances Smaller Than This Are Not Confirmed; Tina Satter for the conception and direction of Is This A Room; Alexandria Wailes for Sustained Excellence as an Artist and Advocate; Asian American Performers Action Coalition (AAPAC) for advocacy of equity, diversity and inclusion; Michael Feingold for Extraordinary Service to the Theater; Lifetime Achievement: Tim Sanford; Vinie Burrows; In addition, Michael Feingold, theatre critic for The Village Voice and former chair of the Obie Awards, became the first recipient of the new Michael Feingold Award, to be awarded annually for excellence in criticism, dramaturgy, translation, scholarship, mentorship, or education.	
~~2021~~	due to the COVID-19 pandemic in New York City, the 66th Obie Awards were not held until 2023, collectively honouring productions of the 2020–21, 2021–22 and 2022–23 theater seasons	
~~2022~~	due to the COVID-19 pandemic in New York City, the 66th Obie Awards were not held until 2023, collectively honouring productions of the 2020–21, 2021–22 and 2022–23 theater seasons	
2023	Best New American Play: Sanaz Toossi (English); Writing: Martyna Majok (Sanctuary City); Directing: Taylor Reynolds (Man Cave, Tambo & Bones); Awoye Timpo (Wedding Band); Saheem Ali for Sustained Excellence in Direction; David Brimmer for Sustained Excellence in Direction; Music Direction and Composition: Matt Ray (The Hang); Performance: Stephanie Berry (On Sugarland); Lizan Mitchell (On Sugarland); Brittany Bradford (Wedding Band); Kara Young (Twelfth Night); Arturo Luís Soria (Ni Mi Madre); Billy Eugene Jones for Sustained Achievement in Performance; Andrea Patterson for Sustained Achievement in Performance; Design: Reza Behjat (English and Wish You Were Here); Jeanette Oi-Suk Yew for sustained achievement in lighting design; Nikiya Mathis for sustained achievement in hair and wig design; Machine Dazzle for sustained achievement in set and costume design; Special Citation: Heather Christian (composer, vocal arrangements, orchestration); Ben Moss (music director, orchestration); Nick Kourtides (sound design); Musical team of Oratorio For Living Things; Creative Team and Ensemble of Fat Ham (The Public Theater) – including James Ijames (playwright), Saheem Ali (director), Maruti Evans (set design), Dominique Fawn Hill (costume design), Stacey Derosier (lighting cesigner), Mikaal Sulaiman (sound design), Darrell Grand Moultrie (choreographer), Earon Chew Nealey (hair and wig design), Skylar Fox (illusions design), and ensemble members Nikki Crawford, Chris Herbie Holland, Billy Eugene Jones, Adrianna Mitchell, Calvin Leon Smith, Marcel Spears, Benja Kay Thomas; Aya Ogawa (playwright) for the creation, writing, and direction of The Nosebleed; Qween Jean; Digital+Virtual+Hybrid Production: Michael Breslin, Patrick Foley, Ariel Sibert, Cat Rodríguez, and Rory Pelsue (creators, writers, directors) in collaboration with David Bengali (video designer) for Circle Jerk; Laurie Woolery for directing in the adaptation of As You Like It; Shaina Taub for music and lyrics in the adaptation of As You Like It; Alex Edelman (Just For Us); Modesto Flako Jimenez (Taxilandia); Richard Nelson for the completion and producing of The Rhinebeck Panorama; Digital+Virtual+Hybrid Production: Sarah Gancher (writer), Jared Mezzocchi and Elizabeth Williamson (directors) (Russian Troll Farm); Lifetime Achievement: Ping Chong; Anne Bogart; Ralph Lee; Casey Compton; Mettawee River Theater Company; Michael Feingold Award: Maestra Music	
2024	Best New American Play: Ryan J. Haddad (Dark Disabled Stories); Writing: Hansol Jung (Wolf Play); Bruce Norris (Downstate); Directing: Dustin Wills (Montag, West Brain, Wolf Play); Shayok Misha Chowdhury (Public Obscenities); Faye Driscoll (Weathering); Eric Ting for Sustained Excellence in Direction; Pam MacKinnon for Sustained Excellence in Direction; Performance: William Jackson Harper (Primary Trust); Marla Mindelle (Titanique); Zuleyma Guevera (Sancocho); Maryann Plunkett (Deep Blue Sound); Shannon Tyo for Sustained Achievement in Performance; John Douglas Thompson for Sustained Achievement in Performance; K. Todd Freeman for Sustained Achievement in Performance; Design: Enver Chakartash - Costume Design; Barbara Samuels - Lighting Design; dots for Sustained Achievement in Design; Mikaal Sulaiman for Sustained Achievement in Sound Design; Special Citations: Ensemble: Ryan J. Haddad, Dickie Hearts, and Alejandra Ospina (Dark Disabled Stories); Design Team of West Brain: Kate Noll (Set), Cha See (Lights), Haydee Zelideth Antuñano (Costumes), Tei Blow (Co-Sound), John Gasper (Co-Sound), Nick Hussong (Projections); Ensemble of The Comeuppance: Brittany Bradford, Caleb Eberhardt, Susannah Flood, Bobby Moreno, Shannon Tyo; Liza Birkenmeier (Writer) and Tara Ahmadinejad (Director) (Grief Hotel); Lead Actors: Ariana Venturi and Nadine Malouf (Montag); Ann C. James - Founder and Mentor of Intimacy Coordinators of Color; Lifetime Achievement: Peggy Shaw and Lois Weaver, Writing and Performing Duo of Split Britches; Carole Rothman, Co-Founder and Artistic Director of Second Stage Theater; Michael Feingold Award: Andrew Morrill - Director of Artistic Sign Language (Dark Disabled Stories); Alison Kopit - Access Dramaturgy (Dark Disabled Stories)	
2025	Outstanding New Play: Jeremy Tiang (Salesman之死); Writing: Ife Olujobi (Jordans); Ariel Stess (Kara & Emma & Barbara & Miranda); Directing: Zhailon Levingston and Bill Rauch (direction), Arturo Lyons and Omari Wiles (choreography) (Cats: The Jellicle Ball); nicHi douglas (direction and choreography) ((pray)); Jack Serio (The Animal Kingdom, On Set With Theda Bara); Tiffany Nichole Greene (Covenant); Sarah Benson for Sustained Excellence in Direction; Performance: Cole Escola (Oh, Mary!); Gabby Beans (Jonah); Dianne Wiest and Johanna Day (Scene Partners); Nathan Lee Graham (Orlando); The Bengsons for Sustained Achievement in Performance; Greg Keller for Sustained Achievement in Performance; Design: Greg Corbino - Production Design; Oana Botez - Costume Design; Stacey Derosier - Lighting Design; Adam Honoré for Sustained Achievement in Lighting Design; Jian Jung for Sustained Achievement in Set Design; Special Citations: Ensemble: Jonathan Burke, Baby Byrne, Tara Lashan Clinkscales, Antwayn Hopper, André De Shields, Sydney James Harcourt, Dava Huesca, Dudney Joseph Jr., Capital Kaos, Junior LaBeija, Robert “Silk” Mason, Shireen Pimentel, “Tempress” Chasity Moore, Primo, Xavier Reyes, Nora Schell, Bebe Nicole Simpson, Emma Sofia, Frank Viveros, Kendall Grayson Stroud, Garnet Williams, Teddy Wilson Jr., Shelby Griswold, and Dominique Lee (Cats: The Jellicle Ball); Raja Feather Kelly (Creator and Director) of The Fires and Ensemble: Beau Badu, Sheldon Best, Phillip James Brannon, Janelle McDermoth, Ronald Peet, Jon-Michael Reese, Jason Veasey, and Michelle Wilson; Milo Cramer (Book, Music, Lyrics, and Performance) and Morgan Green (Director) (School Pictures); Normandy Sherwood (Production Design and Concept) (Psychic Self Defense); The 1491s – Dallas Goldtooth (Mdewakanton Dakota-Diné), Sterlin Harjo (Seminole-Muscogee), Migizi Pensoneau (Ponca-Ojibwe), Ryan RedCorn (Osage Nation) and Bobby Wilson (Sisseton-Wahpeton Dakota) – (Creators) and Ensemble: Rachel Crowl, Derek Garza, Justin Gauthier, Irma-Estel Laguerre, Shyla Lefner, Wotko Long, Jessica Ranville, James Ryen, John Scott-Richardson, Kholan Studi, Shaun Taylor-Corbett, Sheila Tousey, and Ryan Anthony Williams (Between Two Knees); Becca Blackwell and Amanda Duarte (Creators) and Jess Barbagallo (Director) (Snatch Adams & Tainty Mccracken Present It's That Time of The Month); Lifetime Achievement: Charles Busch (writer) (Ibsen’s Ghost: An Irresponsible Biographical Fantasy); Kristin Marting, Founding Artistic Director Emeritus of HERE Arts Center; Paul Zimet, Ellen Maddow, and Tina Shepard (The Following Evening, Shimmer and Herringbone ); Michael Feingold Award: 3Views On Theater; Ross Wetzsteon Award: Theater Mitu	
2026	Outstanding New Play: Nazareth Hassan (Bowl EP); Writing: Morgan Bassichis (Can I Be Frank?); Sarah Gancher (The Wind and the Rain: A story about Sunny's Bar); Directing: Sam Pinkleton (ta-da!, Can I Be Frank?); abigail jean-baptiste (Chiaroscuro); Paul Lazar (The Barbarians); David Herskovits for Sustained Excellence in Direction; Whitney White for Sustained Excellence in Direction; Performance: Bulbul Chakraborty (Rheology); Quincy Tyler Bernstine (Well, I'll Let You Go); Crystal Lucas-Perry (Pericles: A Public Works Concert Experience, The Great Privation ); Stephanie Weeks (Show/Boat: A River); Paul Sparks for Sustained Achievement in Performance; Stephanie Berry for Sustained Achievement in Performance; Design: Afsoon Pajoufar - Set Design; Kate McGee - Lighting Design; Frank J. Oliva - Set Design; Cha See for Sustained Achievement in Lighting Design; David Bengali for Sustained Achievement in Video Design; Special Citations: On The Rocks Theatre Co. for Concept and Creation of The Beastiary; Ensemble of Bowl EP: Felicia Curry, Oghenero Gbaje, and Essence Lotus; Troy Anthony (Libretto, Composition, and Music Direction) (Pericles: A Public Works Concert Experience); Ensemble of Prince Faggot: Rachel Crowl, K Todd Freeman, David Greenspan, Mihir Kumar, John McCrea, and N'yomi Allure Stewart; Mona Pirnot (Playwright), David Greenspan (Performer), and Ken Rus Schmoll (Director) (I'm Assuming You Know David Greenspan); Mehr Theatre Group for Creation of Blind Runner; Lifetime Achievement: Carmelita Tropicana - Performance artist, playwright, lecturer and Latina comedian; Kate Valk, Founding Member and Director of The Wooster Group; Paul Zimet, Ellen Maddow, and Tina Shepard (The Following Evening, Shimmer and Herringbone ); Michael Feingold Award: John Del Gaudio; Ross Wetzsteon Award: Pregones / Puerto Rican Traveling Theater; Morgan Jenness Award: Nicky Paraiso	

== Grants ==
Theatre Grants are awarded each year to select theatre companies. Previous recipients include:

Year	Recipient
1985	Intar
1985	The Production Company
1985	The Richard Allen Center
1985	Spiderwoman Theatre
1985	The Split Britches Company
1986	P.S. 122
1986	Billie Holiday Theatre
1986	Mabou Mines
1987	The Irish Arts Center
1987	Brooklyn Arts and Cultural Association (BACA)
1987	The New Theatre of Brooklyn
1988	CSC Repertory
1988	Theatre for a New Audience
1989	Cucaracha Warehouse Theater
1989	The Living Theater
1990	Dixon Place
1990	Pregones Theater
1990	WOW Cafe
1990	BACA New Works Project
1990	52nd Street Project
1991	En Garde Arts
1991	Hearts and Voices
1991	Mettawee River Theater Company
1992	Downtown Art Company
1992	Franklin Furnace
1992	Soho Repertory Company
1993	Nuyorican Poets Cafe
1993	Pearl Theater
1994	Changing Scenes
1994	HERE Arts Center
1995	Archives at LaMama
1995	Blueprint Series at Ontologic-Hysteric Theatre
1995	Nada
1996	New George's
1996	The TEBA Group
1997	St.Paul's Community Baptist Church Drama Ministry
1997	Great Small Works
1998	Housing Works Theater Project
1998	Caught in the Act annual one-act festival presented (Threshold Theater Co.)
1999	The POINT Community Development Corporation
1999	National Asian American Theater
2000	Five Myles
2000	Circus Amok
2000	Big Dance Theater
2001	Soho Rep
2001	Clubbed Thumb
2001	Classical Theater of Harlem
2001	Mint Theater Company
2002	Ma-Yi Theater Company
2002	Salt Theater Company
2003	Collapsable Hole
2003	Galapagos
2003	The Immigrant Theatre Project
2004	The Civilians
2004	Musicals Tonight
2004	THAW (Theaters Against War)
2005	13P
2005	Epic Theatre Company
2005	Little Theater at Tonic
2005	Gina Gionfriddo Distinguished Emerging Playwright
2005	Margo Skinner Memorial Acting Scholarship
2007	Peculiar Works Project
2007	The Play Company
2007	Synapse Productions
2007	Transport Group
2007	Young Jean Lee
2008	Keen Company
2008	Theater of a Two-Headed Calf
2009	The Chocolate Factory
2009	The Classical Theatre of Harlem
2009	Lark Play Development Center
2010	Harlem School of the Arts
2010	Ontological Incubator
2010	Vampire Cowboys
2011	Metropolitan Playhouse
2011	Wakka Wakka
2012	Bushwick Starr
2012	The Debate Society
2013	Fulcrum Theater
2013	Half Straddle
2014	48 Hours in Harlem
2014	600 Highwaymen
2015	Horse Trade Theater Group / The Fire This Time Festival
2015	JACK (Arts Center)
2016	Bedlam Theatre
2016	Noor Theatre
2016	Prospect Theater Company
2017	Irish Repertory Theatre
2017	Pearl Theatre Company
2017	The Playwrights Realm
2018	Pan-Asian Repertory Theatre
2018	York Theatre Company
2019	The Movement Theatre Company
2019	Target Margin Theatre
2019	WP Theater
2023	The Sol Project
2023	Theatre in Quarantine
2023	See Lighting Foundation
2023	Anticapitalism for Artists
2024	Breaking the Binary Theatre Company
2024	Dominican Artists Collective (DAC)
2024	The Brick
2025	Criminal Queerness Festival (National Queer Theater)
2025	Out of the Box Theatrics
2025	Braata Productions
2025	The 1/52 Project
2025	Tectonic Theater Project
2026	Urban Bush Women (UBW)
2026	The Apothetae
2026	New Federal Theatre (NFT)
2026	¡OYE! Group
2026	Waterwell

Ross Wetzsteon Award is a $2,000 grant awarded to a theatre that nurture innovative new plays. Previous recipients include:

Year	Recipient
1998	Vineyard Theatre
1999	Ellie Covan
1999	Dixon Place
2000	The Foundry
2001	Theatre For A New Audience
2002	PS 122
2003	Soho Think Tank's Ice Factory series at the Ohio Theatre
2004	St. Ann's Warehouse
2005	New Dramatists
2006	Soho Repertory Theater
2007	Rattlestick Theatre
2008	Cherry Lane Theatre Mentor Project
2009	HERE Arts Center
2011	Belarus Free Theatre
2014	Abrons Arts Center
2015	Ars Nova
2016	NAATCO / National Asian American Theatre Company
2017	Theatre For a New Audience
2018	Ma-Yi Theater Company
2019	LCT3
2023	Classical Theatre of Harlem
2024	Under the Radar Festival
2025	Theater Mitu
2026	Pregones / Puerto Rican Traveling Theater

== See also ==
Other awards for off-Broadway theatre are the Lucille Lortel Awards, the Drama Desk Awards, the Drama League Award, and the Outer Critics Circle Awards.
