= WOW Café =

Feminist theater collective in New York City

WOW Café Theater
- Interactive map of WOW Café Theater
- Address: 59-61 E 4th St; New York, NY; United States
- Coordinates: 40.725656°N 73.991794°W

Website
- wowcafe.org

WOW Café Theater is a feminist theater space and collective in East Village, Manhattan, New York City. In the mid-1980s, WOW Café Theater was central to the avant garde theater and performance art scenes in the East Village. Among the artists who have presented at the space are Peggy Shaw, Lois Weaver, Lisa Kron, Holly Hughes, Deb Margolin, Dancenoise, Carmelita Tropicana, Eileen Myles, Honor Molloy, Split Britches, Johnny Science, and The Five Lesbian Brothers.

The WOW Café is still running and meets almost every Tuesday.

== Organizing structure ==
WOW Café Theater is run on anarchist principles of consensus decision-making. WOW does not charge membership fees and members participate in a system of sweat equity. Despite a historical focus on lesbian experiences and subcultures, WOW remains an open space for all women and/or transgender people, particularly women of color and queer women. Most decisions are made at the collective meetings held on Tuesdays at the WOW space on East 4th Street. Since the beginning of the COVID-19 pandemic in the United States, the meetings have moved online.

== History ==
=== 1980s ===
The WOW Café Theater began when two of the founding members, Lois Weaver and Peggy Shaw were traveling Europe with performance troupes Spiderwoman Theater and Hot Peaches, and were inspired to establish a women's theater festival in America after seeing them in there. Together with Jordi Mark and Pamela Camhe, they established the Women's One World Festival in 1980, setting up in the All-Craft Center in the East Village and using what they had seen at the women's theater festivals in Europe for structural inspiration. The organizers wanted the festival to have what Weaver described as a "multimedia environment," and so in addition to performances, the WOW Festival incorporated a social café atmosphere, film screenings, and dancing. Many of the performers came in troupes from Europe, and because the WOW festival was self-funded and on a very tight budget, they covered their own costs of living and arranged their own housing, often being taken in by festival supporters; the opportunity to perform in a festival in New York and the chance for exposure was motivation enough to participate in the festival. The success of the festival prompted management from the All-Craft Center to allow them to begin hosting performance nights on a weekly basis.

Eventually WOW had to leave the All-Craft Center due to pressure from the board that funded the center, believed to be at least partially motivated by homophobic sentiments towards the group's largely lesbian makeup, and had to find a new space in which to perform, ending up at the Ukrainian National Home and adapting a ballroom to their uses. After hosting a second festival at the Ukrainian National Home, the members of the WOW Festival began plans to establish a permanent performance space for the group. Using money they raised through parties, special performances, and other benefits, WOW settled on a space at 330 East 11th Street.

At first, WOW primarily used the venue as an actual café rather than a performance space, selling sandwiches and coffee and serving more of a social purpose than an artistic one. Before long, however, the WOW built a small stage in the café and began to once again hold performances.

Early works in the space included Holly Hughes's Well of Horniness; Split Britches's Split Britches and Beauty and the Beast; and Tennessee Waltz by early collaborators in WOW. In addition to theater, the space was home to brunches, art exhibitions, Variety Night, Cabaret BOW WOW, and Talking Slide Shows.

In 1983, Susan Young became the booking manager for the WOW Café and it became more organized as a performance space, instead of being managed entirely as a collective. Young's influence transformed the Café into a more formal space as well, allowing outside groups to organize and manage some of the events that took place there, rather than leaving all production responsibilities up to the Café for every performance.

In 1984, WOW moved to its current location on East 4th Street.

==== Funding ====
While most of WOW's bills could be covered by box office sales, at times the rent and utilities were paid via benefits, parties, paid dances, or begging passersby. Many of the founding members contributed their outside salaries to the project. The founders of WOW refused to apply for large grants, preferring grassroots fundraising, donating their own money, and occasional small grants. They rejected the notion of changing their work to receive or maintain grants, insisting WOW was a place for complete freedom of expression for the outsiders of society. WOW collective members were aware of the disproportionate money and publicity received by gay men's theaters, noting that The New York Times had never attended a WOW show and The Village Voice rarely ever came, while both regularly reviewed and praised gay men's theaters.

==== Performance atmosphere and lesbian focus ====
To maintain the feeling of collective effort and openness, the WOW organizers declined to hold auditions for their performers, believing that requiring an audition to qualify for their performance space would lead to censorship, which they felt they had experienced after being locked out of the All-Craft Center. The WOW Café was very much geared towards lesbian lives and narratives. Because of this emphasis, a lot of the subject matter of the performances had to do with highlighting and challenging gender roles as social constructs. Some of the criticism that the WOW Café received targeted their usage of butch and femme identities in their performances by some who thought it to be problematic and regressive, but the Café maintained its stance that the portrayal of these stereotypes served as social commentary. Often, the performers exaggerated the gendered aspects of the characters they portrayed to highlight them.

=== 2000s ===
In 2005, the WOW Café Theater changed its mission to explicitly include all women and/or trans people. WOW is a member of Arc on 4th Street. WOW is also a founding member of Fourth Arts Block, an organization created in 2001 by a coalition of cultural and community nonprofit organizations on East 4th Street to save their spaces. Since 2005, WOW has made it a priority to explicitly welcome people of all ages, races, religions, ethnicities, sexualities, and gender identities.

== Notable productions ==
- Well of Horniness (written by Holly Hughes (1985))
- Split Britches (written and directed by Peggy Shaw, Lois Weaver, and Deborah Margolin (1981))
- Beauty and the Beast (written and directed by Peggy Shaw, Lois Weaver, and Deborah Margolin (1982))
- Upwardly Mobile Home (written and directed by Peggy Shaw, Lois Weaver, and Deborah Margolin (1984))
- Voyage to Lesbos (written by The Five Lesbian Brothers, directed by Kate Stafford (1990))
- Brave Smiles...Another Lesbian Tragedy (written by The Five Lesbian Brothers, directed by Kate Stafford (1992))
- Les Beaux Luv (written by Honor Molloy (1993))
- Little Women (written and directed by Peggy Shaw, Lois Weaver, and Deborah Margolin (1988))
