= Arts district =

An arts district or cultural district is a demarcated urban area, usually on the periphery of a city centre, intended to create a 'critical mass' of places of cultural consumption - such as art galleries, theatres, art cinemas, music venues, and public squares for performances. Such an area is usually encouraged by public policy-making and planning, but sometimes occurs spontaneously. It is associated with allied service-industry jobs like cafes, printers, fashion outlets, restaurants, and a variety of 'discreet services' (see the back-page small-ads of almost any cultural events-listings magazine).

Such artistic districts can sometimes spontaneously occur in deprived areas where housing and artistic spaces are at enhanced economic level of affordability, due to a perceived low quality of housing or location. A classic example of this is the famous Kreuzberg area in Berlin which from the 1960s became home to artists and squatters and people seeking an alternative lifestyle. Another example is the Shoreditch area in London, which had a large number of old commercial spaces which artists could use. Rather than town planners deciding that a particular area should have theatres and galleries, these spontaneous artists centres are driven by affordability of space and a concentration of mutual interests.

There may also be some artists' studios located in nearby back-streets. But, as Richard Florida has found from his research, cultural production facilities are often better sited some miles away from cultural consumption facilities - except in some very tolerant cities and in countries where a boisterous alcohol-based nightlife scene does not lead to aggressive and anti-social behaviour.

In the UK the term sometimes used is "Cultural quarter" or "Arts quarter".

== Types of districts ==
=== According to Americans for the Arts ===
Americans for the Arts defines the following types of cultural districts:

- Cultural Compounds: "the oldest districts, primarily established in cities prior to the 1930s. They were built in areas somewhat removed from the city's central business district and have large, open green spaces between buildings. They often comprise major museums, large performing halls, theaters and auditoriums, colleges, libraries, planetariums and zoos". Example - Americans for the Arts gives Forest Park (St. Louis) as an example.
- Major Cultural Institution Focus Districts: "anchored by one or two major cultural institutions, such as a large performing arts center, which then attracts smaller arts organizations around it. These districts are located close to central business districts, near convention centers or other large tourism sites". Americans for the Arts gives the Pittsburgh Cultural District as an example.
- Downtown Area Focus Districts: "encompass the entire downtown area of a city. Designation is often tied to a tourism focus and common in small cities with walkable downtowns". Example - Americans for the Arts gives the Cumberland, Maryland, Arts and Entertainment District as an example.
- Cultural Production Focus Districts: "comprised primarily of community centers, artist studios, and educational arts centers and media facilities and often exist in areas with affordable housing and commercial space. These districts create a cultural hub and enhance city livability for residents of a neighborhood rather than attracting tourists". Example - Americans for the Arts gives the Warehouse Arts District, Tucson as an example.
- Arts and Entertainment Focus Districts: "include more popular culture and commercial attractions and include more modest size buildings with a bohemian feel. They include small theatres, movie houses, private galleries, restaurants, and other entertainment venues." Americans for the Arts gives The District (Nashville) as an example.
- Naturally Occurring Focus Districts: "usually are rooted in community based cultures and identities building on asset-based strategies. They are holistic and are highly diverse and led by local empowered leadership. Generally they are neighborhood-based and artist-driven". Americans for the Arts gives St. George, Staten Island as an example.

=== According to Steiner and Butler ===
Steiner and Butler outline five types of arts districts commonly found in the United States.

1. Cultural compounds - tend to be the oldest art districts often established in cities before the 1930s. These tend to be well-known art districts engrained into the mentality and culture of a community or nation.
2. Major Cultural Institutions - large institutions that serve as anchors for an arts district such as large concert halls, playhouses, libraries, or museums.
3. Arts and entertainment centers - focus primarily on smaller, popular attractions such as small theaters, private galleries, restaurants, and other entertainment that often has a more bohemian feel than larger more established districts.
4. Downtown Arts Districts - occasionally art districts encompass an entire downtown and especially when tourism and walk-ability is the focus of downtown.
5. Cultural Production Districts - cultural production districts are characterized by production spaces such as specialized studios, arts centers, and media facilities. These areas are often tied to affordable studio housing for artists and prioritize the cultural life of the neighborhood.

== Theories of cultural districts ==
The creation of a cultural district implies collaboration between the arts and the local community. Cultural districts may be seen by local authorities as a way to revitalize the “brownfields” of the urban core: areas of abandoned buildings that encourage businesses and residents to leave the cities.

The developing theory of cultural districts increasingly conceives them as development models for local systems, where the term ‘district’ refers to supra-urban area. At supra-urban or regional level the complexity of a cultural district is even more marked than at urban level, due to potential interdependencies among a greater multitude of actors. A useful approach towards a deeper understanding can be to conceive cultural districts as complex adaptive systems. Indeed, complexity is definitely not a management fad and fashion, a mere metaphor or methodology, but a deeper perception of reality. Organizations are classically seen as purpose-driven entities with a structural form, exhibiting a certain degree of order and determinism. Such a linear top-down approach to analysis and design, however, exhibits many limitations when used for organizational settings characterized by a complex web of interdependencies. The view of a cultural district as a complex adaptive system suggests new ideas and approaches for policy-makers, designers and managers. It also opens up debate on issues of organizational design and change.

All cultural districts are unique, reflecting their cities’ unique environment, including history of land use, urban growth and cultural development. There is no standard model. Most cultural districts are built to take advantage of other city attractions such as historic features, convention spaces and parks and other natural amenities.

Structural considerations within or near the district, community leadership and social forces all influence the development of a cultural district and the type of district that results. Factors influencing the siting of cultural districts include: perceived need for urban revitalization, existing investment, property value and preexisting cultural facilities.

Unlike a cultural center or a shopping mall, a cultural district comprises a large number of property owners, both public and private, who control the various properties involved, hence a structural complexity. The effectiveness of the coordinating agency in guiding the direction of the cultural district varies according to its size, budget, mandated functions and degree of authority, resulting in widespread variation in the coordinated cultural programming and administration services offered by cultural districts. The coordinated agency appointed for the district must work carefully to ensure inclusiveness of concerns and to balance potentially conflicting interests.

Cultural districts offer two major types of services: one targets the arts community, providing marketing /promotion, box office services and property management; the other targets the district's business and property owners, offering urban design and development services or administrative support.

The excitement and attraction of a cultural district is a high mixture of interesting things to do, places to see, and places to visit (both cultural and noncultural), across the day and evening.

Some artist-activists are promoting the concept of a "Naturally Occurring Cultural District," or NOCD, patterned after the demographic concept of a naturally occurring retirement community. A NOCD "supports existing neighborhood cultural assets rather than imposing arts institutions somewhere new," according to Tamara Greenfield, co-director of NOCD-New York. Co-director Caron Atlas explained: "If a cultural district has emerged 'naturally,' then it grows from, builds on and validates existing community assets rather than importing assets from outside a community." Indeed, different conceptions of cultural districts include self-organization and emergence in different degrees (e.g. Lazzeretti, 2003; Le Blanc, 2010; Sacco et al., 2013; Stern & Seifert, 2007). Many authors argue that districtualization is essentially spontaneous and that the conditions for formation can be recognized and sustained, not created from the top. If the conception of a cultural district as a complex adaptive system were accepted, the design process would be conceived as something more flexible, dynamic and in evolution. Complexity theory and complex adaptive systems should move understanding of supra-urban cultural districts towards a more holistic and bottom-up approach rather than a linear top-down approach to analysis and design. This does not suggest inhibiting any attempt at prediction or planning. The use of qualitative analysis and rough estimations or agent-based modelling can represent a fertile ground for both future research, policy-making and managerial implications.

== List ==
Notable arts districts in the United States (alphabetical by city):

- Midtown, Atlanta, Georgia
- North Village Arts District, Columbia, Missouri
- Short North, Columbus, Ohio
- Arts District, Dallas, Texas
- Art District on Santa Fe, Denver, Colorado
- Cultural Center Historic District, Detroit, Michigan
- Miller Beach Arts and Creative District, Gary, Indiana
- Indianapolis Cultural Districts
- Crossroads Arts District, Kansas City, Missouri
- Downtown Arts District, Las Vegas, Nevada
- East Village, Long Beach, California
- Arts District, Downtown Los Angeles, California
- Noho Arts District, North Hollywood, Los Angeles, California
- Arts & Entertainment District, Miami, Florida
- Wynwood Art District, Miami, Florida
- East Fourth street Cultural District, Manhattan, New York City, led by Fourth Arts Block
- Uptown Oakland, California
- Paseo Arts District, Oklahoma City, Oklahoma
- Cultural District, Pittsburgh
- Arts District, Portland, Maine
- Pearl District, Portland, Oregon
- Arts District, Richmond, Virginia
- Ray Street Arts District in North Park, San Diego, California
- Village of the Arts, Bradenton/Sarasota, Florida
- Northeast Minneapolis Arts District, Minneapolis, Minnesota

Art districts in London include:

- Shoreditch
- Broadway Market

== See also ==
- Urban regeneration
- Creative industries
- Cultural industries
- Entertainment district
- Creative class
