= Fourth Arts Block =

Advocacy organization for East Village

Fourth Arts Block (FAB) is the leadership organization for the East Village, Manhattan cultural district in New York City, United States, building a permanent home for the arts and preserving the neighborhood's creative character. FAB advocates for the District, directs marketing and outreach efforts, leads projects that contribute to sustainable development, and supports the development and capacity of its members.

East Fourth Street is home to more than a dozen nonprofit cultural and community organizations, and was designated a Cultural District by Mayor Michael Bloomberg in January 2006. “Downtown's Theater Row" contains 10 theater companies, two dance companies, four visual arts organizations, and two non-profit community development organizations that have worked to create a plan for the long-term development of the cultural buildings on the block.

== Background ==
The East Village and Lower East Side of Manhattan has gone through remarkable change, particularly in the past three decades, when it began to experience a major real estate boom together with a huge influx of (mostly) young, single professionals attracted by the neighborhood's vibrant, diverse, creative character.

The story of the neighborhood immediately surrounding East 4th Street between Second Avenue and the Bowery is unique in its history of artistic activity and grassroots activism. At the turn of the century, 66 East 4th Street, known as Turin Hall, was a focal point for the German immigrant community, and the first Yiddish theater in New York, in what became the Yiddish Theater District. Next door, at 64 E. 4th, was the Labor Lyceum, where early advocates for unionizing gathered and the International Ladies Garment Workers' Union was born.

However, by the 1970s, the city was holding on to a large number of vacant properties, all acquired through eminent domain, with plans, developed by Robert Moses, to raze this "slum area" entirely. Neighborhood protest and the city's economic downturn halted everything other than the establishment of the 'Cooper Square Urban Renewal Area" and a hopeful plan for its development.

The empty buildings sat there unused until La Mama, a small experimental theater and a founder of the Off-Off-Broadway movement which embraced artistic experimentation and social protest, led by the legendary Ellen Stewart, secured a 30-day lease from the city on a dilapidated property. The city's condition for the low rent was simply that La Mama would bear full responsibility for anything beyond the most basic maintenance of the building's shell. Gradually, other neighborhood arts groups secured similar 30-day leases in adjoining vacant buildings on the block. Fixing the properties up was all on their shoulders; bit by bit they repaired the roofs, kept the boilers operating, and improved their spaces. The 30 day leases stayed in effect for anywhere from 15 to 30 years. That ended in October 2005 when these same pioneering tenants became owners and the East 4th Street Cultural District became a reality.

Usually, at this chapter in the gentrification story, the exodus begins. Artists and small arts groups are forced out due to wildly escalating rents. Manhattan communities once more prove inhospitable to the kind of diversity and cutting edge creativity these small groups represent. However, in a decision that surprised many, the city - with unanimous support at all levels of government - decided to sell six buildings and two vacant lots on East 4th Street between 2nd Avenue and the Bowery for $1 each to the artist tenants. Local leadership, which has been actively seeking to diversify the area's reliance on bars/clubs/restaurants as its prime source of economic activity, enthusiastically lent its support. The East 4th Street Cultural District was created. All the properties are restricted to non-profit cultural use in perpetuity; and, to date, $4.7 million in city and state monies have been allocated for their renovation.

The East 4th Street Cultural District is only one block long, yet it encompasses 17 theaters and rehearsal studios, three film editing suites, and a large screening room. Each year it hosts over 200,000 people attending performances, workshops, and readings involving more than 1200 artists. Through the plan for the Cultural District, more than 35,000 square feet (3,300 m^{2}) of vacant space on East 4th Street will be transformed into active cultural use.

== Community building ==
FAB engages in a number of activities throughout the year that engage and strengthen the broader local community, such as the Load OUT!, a biannual “reuse and repurposing riot” aimed at transforming one person's trash into another person's treasure.

Beginning in 2013, leaders from organizations on the Fourth Arts Block began inviting local civic and arts groups to plan for the first-ever Lower East Side History Month (LESHM), which took place in May 2014 and is imagined as an annual event. With 33 local groups on the steering committee alone, LESHM debuted with scores of theater, music, visual arts, panel discussion and participatory events scheduled throughout the month, with everything from a Bowery film festival to a discussion about saxophonist Ornette Coleman and the Five Spot Café.

The month kicked off with “Chalk LES,” a weekend when anyone and everyone was encouraged to write official and personal histories on sidewalks where notable events occurred.

== Rod Rogers Dance Company and DUO Multicultural Arts Center ==
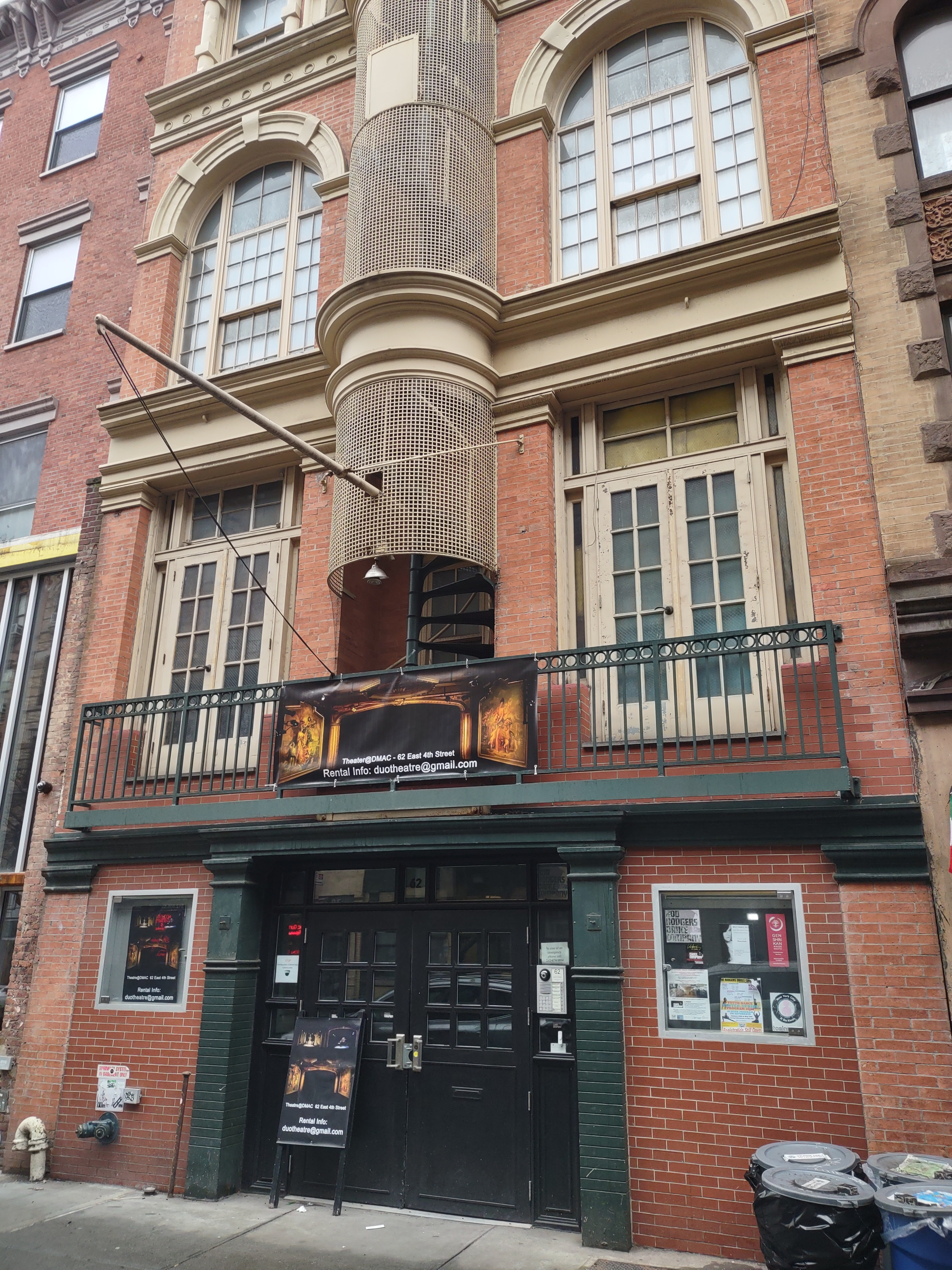
DMac Theatre

Home to both the Rod Rogers Dance Company and the DUO Multicultural Arts Center (DMAC), 62 East 4th Street is a five-story building which stands between Second Avenue and the Bowery.

By 2007 the building was severely deteriorated. The NYC Department of Design and Construction began the exterior renovation under the leadership of SUPERSTRUCTURES Engineers + Architects.

The façade restoration of 62 East Fourth Street involved the recreation of the cornice and the balconies, replacement of the windows with historically appropriate materials, and analysis of paint in order to match the historic color.

The restoration was substantially complete in 2011 and in 2012 received the Lucy G. Moses Preservation Award from the New York Landmarks Conservancy – a rare distinction since the building is not an officially designated New York City Landmark.

== Members ==
East 4th Street is home to more than a dozen arts and community groups, most of whom are pioneers of the block and have had long histories of racial and ethnic diversity, artistic ingenuity, and engaging low-income families:

- Alpha Omega Theatrical Dance
- Cooper Square Committee
- Cooper Square Mutual Housing Association
- Creative Time
- Downtown Art
- DUO Multi-Cultural Arts Center
- East Village Art View
- La MaMa Experimental Theatre Club
- Millennium Film Workshop
- New York Theatre Workshop
- Paradise Factory
- Rod Rodgers Dance Company
- Rod Rodgers Dance School
- Teatro Circulo
- Teatro IATI
- Works in Progress
- WOW Cafe Theatre
