= Peggy Shaw =

American dramatist (born 1944)

- Born: July 27, 1944 (age 82); Belmont, Massachusetts, U.S.
- Education: Massachusetts College of Art
- Occupations: Actor, writer, producer
- Known for: Founder of the Split Britches
- Awards: Doris Duke Award, Edwin Booth Award, Ethyl Eichelberger Award, Hemispheric Institute Art Matters Award, Otto Award for Excellence in Political Theatre, New York Foundation for the Arts Fellowship for Emerging Forms, Out on the Edge of Theatre Award for Sustained Excellence, Anderson Foundation Stonewall Award for Sustained Excellence, 3 Obie Awards
- Website: http://www.split-britches.com/peggy/

Peggy Shaw (born July 27, 1944) is an American actor, writer, and producer living in New York City. She is a founding member of the Split Britches and WOW Cafe Theatre, and is a recipient of several Obie Awards, including two for Best Actress for her performances in Dress Suits to Hire in 1988 and Menopausal Gentleman in 1999.

== Early life and education ==
Born Margaret A. Shaw in Belmont, Massachusetts, she was raised in a working class Irish Congregationalist family with six siblings. When she was thirteen, she was a missionary in Costa Rica.

Shaw moved to New York in 1967. She had a child and was a social worker for the New York City Agency for Child Development.

In 1967, Shaw earned her Bachelor of Fine Arts in Painting and Printmaking at the Massachusetts College of Art.

== Career ==
At the age of 31 after seeing Hot Peaches (a theater group in New York that consisted mostly of drag queens) perform in Sheridan Square, Shaw became involved with the company. Shaw began by painting sets for Hot Peaches and constructing paper mâché heads for a parade performance. Her first experience on stage was in 1975 on a gay tour of Europe. During this time, she saw Spiderwoman Theater in Amsterdam and met Lois Weaver. Shaw and Hot Peaches lived in London for 3 years, where they met Bette Bourne, who would go on to found the Bloolips after his experiences with Hot Peaches.

Shaw founded the troupe Split Britches with Deb Margolin and Lois Weaver in 1980. She also co-founded WOW Cafe Theater, an ongoing performance festival and venue.

Shaw suffered a stroke in 2011. Her show, RUFF, directed by longtime collaborator Lois Weaver, explores her experiences as a survivor.

The University of Michigan published A Menopausal Gentleman, a book that includes many of the scripts from Shaw's solo performances.

== Shows ==
- The Slow Drag
- You're Just Like My Father
- To My Chagrin
- MUST: The Inside Story
- Dress Suits To Hire
- Belle Reprieve
- Menopausal Gentleman
- RUFF

== Awards and grants ==
Shaw has received Obie Awards for her performances in Dress Suits To Hire, and Menopausal Gentleman, and an ensemble award for her work in Belle Reprieve.

- 1988: Village Voice OBIE Award for performance in Dress Suits to Hire
- 1990: Village Voice OBIE for the ensemble in Belle Reprieve
- 1994: Nominee for Cal/Arts Herb Alpert Award
- 1995: Anderson Foundation Stonewall Award for Sustained Excellence, Jane Chambers Award for the Best Play, Villager Award to Split Britches Company for Best Ensemble, Nominee for Cal/Arts Herb Alpert Award
- 1998: Out on the Edge Theatre Award for Sustained Achievement
- 1999: Village Voice OBIE for the production Menopausal Gentlemen, Nominee for Cal/Arts Herb Alpert Award
- 2004: The Foundation for Contemporary Arts Grants to Artists award.
- 2005: The Foundation for Contemporary Performance, Theatre Performer of the Year
- 2006: Otto Award for Excellence in Political Theatre
- 2014: Doris Duke Artist Award for Theater
