= Imagining Madoff =

2010 play by Deb Margolin

Imagining Madoff is a 2010 play by playwright Deb Margolin that tells the story of an imagined encounter between Bernard Madoff, the admitted operator of what has been described as the largest Ponzi scheme in history, and his victims. Margolin had originally planned to use Nobel Laureate and Holocaust survivor Elie Wiesel as a character representing a victim, but was obliged by legal threats to substitute a fictional character, whom she named Solomon Galkin.

== Elie Wiesel's response to the play ==
Wiesel had been one of Madoff's most notable victims, having lost his life savings to Madoff's fraud in addition to more than $15 million in losses to a charitable foundation Wiesel operated, the Elie Wiesel Foundation for Humanity, with Wiesel calling Madoff a "thief, scoundrel, criminal". Wiesel had been chosen as a character by Margolin because she felt that he was "synonymous with decency, morality, the struggle for human dignity and kindness". In Margolin's original version of the play, the Elie Wiesel character was intended to be a moral authority and key character in the play, in which he recounted his concentration camp experiences and provided meditations on repentance. Margolin sent a copy of the play to Wiesel, who responded in April 2010 with a letter calling the play "obscene" and "defamatory" and threatening legal action to prevent the play from being staged. In an interview with National Public Radio on May 20, 2010, attorney Richard Lehv expressed his opinion that Wiesel would have had little chance in court of preventing Margolin from using him as a character, noting that "it's a free country. You can make a public figure a character in a work of fiction."

== Productions ==
The play was originally to have been staged at Theater J, a Jewish theater in Washington, D.C. in May 2010, but was canceled after Wiesel made his objections known. After Ari Roth, artistic director of Theater J, had offered to submit the play to Wiesel's foundation for review, Margolin objected, viewing the offer as giving Wiesel veto power over the play's content. Margolin called the experience "painful" and said that she was "still scared to talk about it" because of fear of lawsuits, but she felt that she "didn't want to abandon this play". Though the character of Wiesel was formally excised from the play, the replacement character Solomon Galkin, described in the play's script as "80 years old, Holocaust survivor, poet, translator, treasurer of his synagogue", retained most of the dialogue that had originally been planned for the Wiesel character.

The revised play premiered in July–August 2010 at Stageworks/Hudson in Hudson, New York. It ran at Washington's Theater J from August 31 to September 25, 2011.

Artistic director Laura Margolis of Stageworks/Hudson has commented that nothing was lost by removing the Wiesel character, and that the new version of the play gave Margolin greater liberties to develop the Galkin character as a person, rather than as representing a famous figure. In a July 2010 article in The New York Times, Margolin emphasized that she had never planned "to be on the wrong side of anybody, let alone someone I admire".

The New Repertory Theatre of Watertown, MA staged the New England premiere in January 2014, which included sixteen sold-out performances. An encore extension was co-presented with the Boston Center for American Performance at the Boston University Theatre-Comley Studio 210 in May–June 2014.

== Awards ==
On February 27, 2012, Deb Margolin's Imagining Madoff was nominated for the 28th Annual Helen Hayes Awards which celebrates excellence in professional theater in the Washington D.C. area.
