= Nilaja Sun =

American actor and playwright

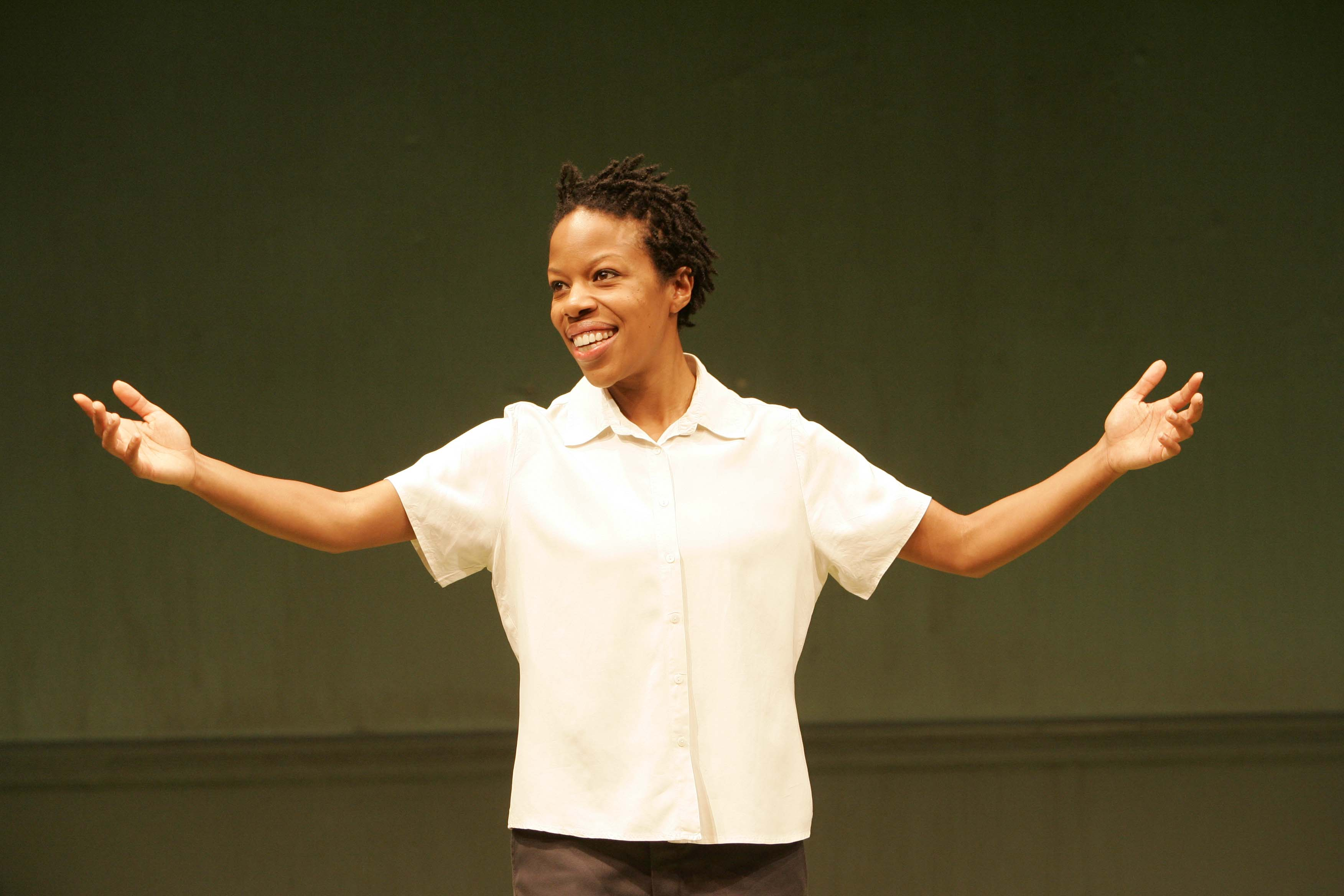
Nilaja Sun in No Child...

Nilaja Sun (born Nilaja Sun Gordon) is an actress, playwright, and a teaching artist from the Lower East Side in New York City. Sun has taught theatre in New York City public schools since 1998 and is best known for her award-winning one-person play, No Child... and Pike St. She is half Puerto Rican and half African-American.

== Career ==
Sun has been featured in TV shows and movies, including The Bourne Legacy (2012), Law & Order: Special Victims Unit (2004–2006), 30 Rock (2008–2012) and Madam Secretary (2014 - 2019)

Her most famous work, No Child..., follows the story of Miss Sun, a visiting teacher in a 10th grade classroom at Malcolm X High School in the Bronx. The one-person play includes 16 characters, a mixture of students, teachers, and administration. The play was created by Sun based on her eight-year experience with arts education in New York City schools, including at Martin Luther King Jr. High School. The story is narrated by the school's longtime janitor and follows the character's ups and downs as Miss Sun directs them in the performance of Timberlake Wertenbaker's 1988 play Our Country's Good, which in turn tells an 18th-century story of a British lieutenant directing a group of Australian convicts in the production of George Farquhar's 1706 comedy The Recruiting Officer. Through the play, Sun wants to shows how the school system is breaking and ultimately hopes to capture the life and love that exists in schools. No Child... is filled with humor, but representative of the experiences of children and teachers in under-resourced public schools across the United States. As of 2012, Sun has performed No Child... 2500 times worldwide.

The play's title alludes to President George W. Bush's No Child Left Behind Act. Sun has stated that the show is not a direct indictment on the act, but a spotlight on great teachers. Sun chose this title in hopes that the audience would make a connection to education and able finish the phrase No Child... with what the play meant to them.

No Child... was funded by a grant from the New York State on the Arts and from a commission by the Epic Theatre Ensemble, formerly known as Epic Theater Center. Sun has worked closely with the ensemble for five years and produced nearly 20 of Epic's “Journeys” Programs and participated in Epic's Off-Broadway productions of Einstein's Gift, Pieces of the Throne and Time and the Conways. Through Epic's “Journeys” Programs Epic artists work closely with students in English, History, and Economics classrooms to analyze a play, rewrite their own version, and perform it alongside professional actors. Sun also teaches writing workshops at New York City's Rikers Island jail complex.

Sun was featured in the American Theatre Wing's Working in the Theatre series on solo performance in 2017.

== Awards and honors ==
Sun's work has garnered critical acclaim and a total of 21 awards, including the Obie Award, the Lucille Lortel Award, and the soloNOVA Award for Artist of the Year by terraNOVA Collective. Sun's play “No Child...” was also named the Best One-Person Show at the U.S. Comedy Arts Festival in Aspen and received two Outer Critics Circle Awards for Outstanding Solo Performance and for Outstanding New American Play.

Other awards include:

- Princess Grace Award
- Theatre World Award
- Helen Hayes Award
- two NAACP Theatre Awards

== Filmography ==
Year	Title	Role
2004/2006	Law & Order: Special Victims Unit	Nurse / Triage Nurse
2008/2012	30 Rock	Irene
2009/I	The International	Detective Gloria Hubbard
2010	Rubicon	Agent Madero
2010	Louie	Woman on Phone
2010	Knight and Day	Allison
2011	Unforgettable	Ivory
2012	Nature Calls	Moses Mother
2012	The Bourne Legacy	Blue Lab Doctor
2013	HairBrained	Skidmore Moderator
2014	Irreversible	Makeup Artist
2014–2016	Madam Secretary	Juliet
2015	Nurse Jackie	Tress
2015	The Good Wife	Divya Feldman
2016	Knock Knock	Veronica Young
