= Split Britches =

American performance troupe

Split Britches is an American performance troupe that has been producing work internationally since 1980. Academic Sue-Ellen Case says, "their work has defined the issues and terms of academic writing on lesbian theater, butch-femme role playing, feminist mimesis, and the spectacle of desire." In New York City, Split Britches has a long-standing relationship with La Mama Experimental Theatre Company, where they are a resident company; Wow Café, which Weaver and Shaw co-founded; and Dixon Place.

== Founding ==
Split Britches was founded by Peggy Shaw, Lois Weaver, and Deb Margolin in New York City in 1980. Shaw and Weaver met in Europe while Weaver was touring with Spiderwoman Theater, and Shaw with Hot Peaches, performing Spiderwoman Theater's An Evening of Disgusting Songs and Pukey Images. This production was the first time Spiderwoman presented lesbian content and introduced Peggy as a Spiderwoman performer.

Weaver and Shaw decided to leave Spiderwoman, and one of the Spiderwoman performers they had been working with declined to continue with them. This led them to ask Margolin, who was a writer, to assist with the script of Split Britches, and Margolin became a part of the company for many years.

== Split Britches, The True Story ==
"Split britches" is a reference to the type of pants women wore while working in the fields, which allowed them to urinate without stopping work. Additionally, in the context of the company, this name has been said to mimic the “split pants” of poverty and comedy.

In the summer of 1980, Weaver began writing a performance about her two aunts and great-aunt in the Blue Ridge Mountains of Virginia called Split Britches, The True Story. The performance was originally developed with Spiderwoman performers and was performed at the first WOW (Women's One World) Festival, founded by Shaw and Weaver, in 1980, with a subsequent performance in 1981.

The final version of Split Britches was performed at the Boston Women's Festival in the spring of 1981 and at the Second WOW festival in the fall of 1981. The script was first published in Women & Performance, and premiered on public television in 1988, directed and produced by Mathew Geller in association with WGBH/WNET Television and the NYFA ‘Artists New Works Program'.

== Operating finances ==
Early in their history, the company decided not to spend time applying for grants to support their performances and instead worked outside these systems using their own finances from jobs to support their performance. This is due to a belief stated by Shaw that "it's easier to get a job than a grant." This held true for the beginning of the company's existence, but as it became more established, it began to apply for grants.

== Artistic themes ==
Split Britches has worked with concepts of lesbian, queer, dyke, butch, and femme identities and cultures in a context of American feminism and live arts movements that emerged in the 1970s. The troupe uses performances to create safe spaces in which non-normative sexualities and genders can occur in peace.

Geraldine Harris has placed the work of the troupe in a "postmodern Brechtian tradition" and, in an article on this troupe, describes the focus in their work on borders, as they often take on ideas of duality. Split Britches' work involves concepts of the duality of butch/femme, as well as concepts around class, classism, and oppression. Harris also explains that the troupe opposes the gender binary as a mode of political performance. Split Britches also examines the fetishization, objectification, and narcissistic misidentifications that cannot be separated from love, passion, and desire.

== Impact and significance ==
In Split Britches: Lesbian Practice/Feminist Performance, critic and theorist Sue-Ellen Case describes the importance of the trio in the development of contemporary lesbian performance, writing that "the troupe created a unique 'postmodern' style that served to embed feminist and lesbian issues of the times, economic debates, national agendas, personal relationships, and sex-radical role playing in spectacular and humorous deconstructions of canonical texts, vaudeville shtick, cabaret forms, lip-synching satire, lyrical love scenes, and dark, frightening explorations of class and gender violence." Split Britches has been praised for having maintained a theater space for women's artistic endeavors. The shows are often praised for the deconstructive and transformative lenses through which they are written.

Split Britches' work comes from a tradition of performance art that is academically documented by the field of performance studies. Their work is cited as indicative of lesbian art, which brings up issues of subjectivity. It has been central to the development of feminist performance theory and distinguishing lesbian critical theory, for example, in the pioneering work of Jill Dolan on the feminist spectator, Sue-Ellen Case on butch/femme aesthetics, and Alisa Solomon and Kate Davy on feminist performance contexts.

== Methodology ==
In a dissertation by Deanna Beth Shoemaker, Split Britches was said to use games, fantasies, songs, dance numbers, and monologues to address issues including female desire, power, and lesbian identity. The characters in the performances play on gender and sexuality binaries, and explore issues of lesbian femme identity within and outside the butch/femme dynamic.

The company began by exploring a personal obsession or frustration, such as Tennessee Williams or Aileen Wuornos, which is often taken from popular culture. Shaw has said this is because, through popular images, they are able to maintain a queer aesthetic while keeping an audience engaged. Weaver and Shaw always try to make reference to a comedy duo from the 1950s or 1960s, which is often Mike Nichols and Elaine May, due to their comedic structure and gender dynamics. Next, the company makes lists, including a list of things they want to do on stage, current social issues, cultural icons, and stories they want to tell. They then choose characters that are split between good qualities and bad qualities, which Weaver has said is "like loving a part of yourself and your past." Despite playing characters, Weaver and Shaw say they always play themselves, including personal stories and anecdotes. Weaver has said. "In the process of making personal performance, lying is always an option, and creating truth is the goal." Next, they begin collecting found objects and working on music to incorporate. Finally, the company begins rehearsals, weaving together the disparate fragments. Throughout their history, Weaver has functioned as the primary director.

In recent years, public engagement and dialogue have become an integral part of the Split Britches creative process. This takes the form of workshops and public conversations, often moderated through formats from Weaver's Public Address Systems project.

== Public engagement ==
From 2002 to 2003, Weaver and Shaw designed and ran workshops in four women's prisons in Brazil and the UK as part of the 'Staging Human Rights' project, initiated by People's Palace Projects. The workshops intended to use performance to discuss human rights with female prisoners.

== Controversies ==
At the time Split Britches was formed, cross-dressing and drag were popular, so this has become a central part of some of their performances. Some of the performances by the troupe have come under fire for the portrayal of certain characters. Specifically, the coproduction of Belle Reprieve by Split Britches and Bloolips, a group of gay drag performers. In this performance, gender norms are erased, and the binary is played upon. This performance has been critiqued due to the female actors dressing as men. Because most instances of cross-dressing are males dressing up ultra-feminine, this performance was unusual. It was said that this type of performance further holds men to be superior to women. Additionally, it has been criticized that cross-dressing reinforces the gender binary, which so many feminists have worked to eliminate.

== Awards ==
2017: Innovative Theatre Achievement Award

2014: Hemispheric Institute of Performance Senior Fellowship, Lois Weaver and Peggy Shaw

1999: Obie, best performer Peggy Shaw for Menopausal Gentleman

1991: Obie, best ensemble, Split Britches and Bloolips, for Belle Reprieve

1988: Obie, best performer Peggy Shaw for Dress Suits to Hire

1985: The Villager Award for best ensemble

== Shows ==
Unexploded Ordnances (UXO), 2016-present

RUFF, 2012–present

What Tammy Found Out, 2012–present

Lost Lounge, 2009–2011

Miss America, 2008–2009

Retro-Perspective, 2007–present

MUST, 2007–present

Diary of a Domestic Terrorist, 2005

What Tammy Needs to Know, 2004

To My Chagrin, 2003

Miss Risque, 2001

It's a Small House and We Lived in It Always, 1999

Little Women, 1998

Little Women, The Tragedy, 1998

Salad of the Bad Cafe, 1998

Valley of the Dolls, 1997

Faith and Dancing, 1996

Menopausal Gentleman, 1996

Lust and Comfort, 1994

You're Just Like My Father, 1993

Lesbians Who Kill, 1992

Anniversary Waltz, 1990

Of All The Nerve, 1990

Belle Reprieve, 1990

Little Women, The Tragedy, 1988

Dress Suits for Hire, 1987

Patience and Sarah, 1987

Upwardly Mobile Home, 1984

Beauty and the Beast, 1982

Split Britches, The True Story, 1980

== See also ==
- Holly Hughes
- WOW Cafe Theatre
