= Nancy Wickwire =

American actress (1925–1974)

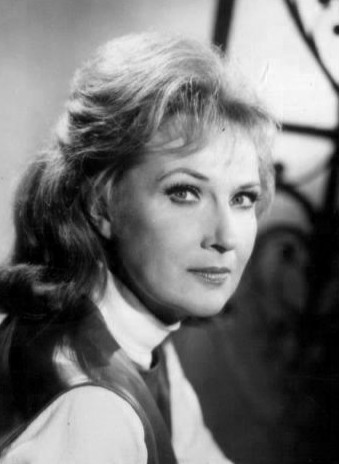
- Wickwire in 1971
- Born: Nancy Marie Wickwire; November 20, 1925; Harrisburg, Pennsylvania
- Died: July 10, 1974 (aged 48); San Francisco, California
- Education: Carnegie Institute of Technology
- Occupation: Actress

Nancy Marie Wickwire (November 20, 1925 – July 10, 1974) was an American stage and television actress known for her roles on several daytime soap operas.

== Early years ==
Nancy Wickwire was born on November 20, 1925, in Harrisburg, Pennsylvania, the younger child of two daughters of Ruth Marie (née Larson) and Alva Burton Wickwire, who was a traveling manager with Railway Express Agency. Wickwire was a graduate of the John Harris High School (1943) and earned a Bachelor of Science from the Carnegie Institute of Technology (1948).

Wickwire acted in productions at her high school, in the Harrisburg Community Theater, and on radio station WSBA. She also won a scholarship to study acting at Old Vic School in London (1949-1951).

== Television ==
Wickwire's major media debut came in March 1960 in Valley of Decision, a television remake of The Valley of Decision, a 1945 film that starred Gregory Peck and Greer Garson. Wickwire, who was awarded the lead when Glynis Johns was unable to continue due to illness, played the part of "an Irish lass of a working class family going to work as a housemaid for the richest family in Pittsburgh."

Wickwire's visibility then increased when she appeared on Omnibus. She appeared on Guiding Light (Lila Taylor Kelly, 1954–1955), As the World Turns (Claire English, 1960–1964), Another World (Liz Matthews, 1969–1971), and Days of Our Lives (Phyllis Anderson, 1972–73).

In addition, she made guest appearances on a number of prime time series, including Route 66, The Fugitive, The Invaders, Ironside and Gunsmoke (where she starred as “Nell”, a psychotic, over protective and over religious older sister in the 1963 episode “My Sister’s Keeper” - S9E6). Her last appearance was in a 1973 episode of Barnaby Jones.

She also starred in a dramatic program for the British Broadcasting Corporation.

== Stage ==
Wickwire acted in summer stock theatre productions in Plymouth, Massachusetts, and Syracuse, New York. Her Broadway debut came in Saint Joan (1951). Her other Broadway credits include Here's Where I Belong (1965), The Impossible Years (1965), Traveller Without Luggage (1964), Abraham Cochrane (1964), The Golden Age (1963), Seidman and Son (1962), Measure for Measure (1957), and The Grand Prize (1955).

For two summers, she acted in productions at the American Shakespeare Festival in Stratford, Connecticut.

== Personal life and death ==
Wickwire was married to director Basil Langton. She died from cancer at Mount Zion Hospital in San Francisco, California, on July 10, 1974. She was forty-eight years old.
