= Deb Margolin =

American performance artist, playwright

- Occupations: Performance artist and playwright
- Website: www.debmargolin.com

Deb Margolin is an American performance artist and playwright. She came to prominence in the 1980s in the feminist political theatre troupe Split Britches, which she co-founded with Lois Weaver and Peggy Shaw. Margolin has since created a string of one-woman shows. A compilation of her texts, Of All The Nerve: Deb Margolin SOLO, was published in 1999 by Cassell/Continuum Press. Literary theorist Lynda Hart edited and wrote a commentary on each piece.

Margolin was the recipient of a 1999-2000 Obie Award for Sustained Excellence in Performance. In 2005, Margolin won the Joseph Kesselring Prize for her play, Three Seconds in the Key, a multi-character play which reflected her own experiences with Hodgkin's Disease.

She currently teaches playwrighting and performance as an associate professor at Yale University. Her work includes O Yes I Will, a detailed account of her experiences and insights on being under general anaesthesia.

Margolin was forced to revise her 2010 play Imagining Madoff after legal threats from Elie Wiesel, who was one of Bernard Madoff's victims and had called Madoff a "scoundrel" but had refused to allow a character representing him and using his name to be used in the play.

In the 1990s, Margolin participated in the Zale-Kimmerling Writer in Residence program at Tulane University in New Orleans, LA. In 2018, she donated a large quantity of her personal materials such as journals, manuscripts, newspaper articles, flyers, ephemera, poetry, and correspondence to the Newcomb Archives at Tulane, forming the Deb Margolin Collection, which spans the years 1970 to 2016. In the spring of 2020, an exhibit entitled "Deb Margolin's Performance Composition: Writing and Embodying" was shown at Tulane. It focused on Margolin's process of performance composition by displaying her notes and writing (both handwritten and typed) from her work as a university professor, actor, and playwright.

== Works ==
- The God Show (1982)
- Coupla Weirdos (1986)
- In a Vacuum (1988)
- What's with Hamlet? (1989)
- Of All the Nerve (1989)
- You Don't Even Know Where the Strike Zone Is (1990)
- 970-DEBB (1990)
- Gestation (1991)
- Lesbians Who Kill (1992)
- The Breaks (1993), written with Rae C. Wright
- Of Mice, Bugs and Women (1994)
- Carthieves! Joyrides! (1995)
- Bearing Witnesses (1996)
- O Wholly Night & Other Jewish Solecisms (1996)
- Critical Mass (1997)
- Bringing the Fishermen Home (1998)
- Three Seconds in the Key (2001)
- Rock, Scissors, Paper (2002)
- Why Cleaning Fails (2002)
- Snapshot (2002)
- Index to Idioms (2003)
- The Rich Silk Of It (2005)
- Time Is The Mercy of Eternity (2006)
- Clarisse and Larmon (2006)
- O Yes I Will (2006)
- Imagining Madoff (2010)
- Good Morning Anita Hill It’s Ginni Thomas I Just Wanted To Reach Across the Airwaves and the Years and Ask You To Consider Something I Would Love You To Consider an Apology Sometime and Some Full Explanation of Why You Did What You Did With My Husband So Give It Some Thought and Certainly Pray About This and Come To Understand Why You Did What You Did Okay Have a Good Day. (2011)
- Turquoise (2014)
- 8 Stops (2015)
- Just Give Me One Half-Hour With My Mother (2020)
- This is Not a Time of Peace (2024)
