= Holly Hughes (performance artist) =

American lesbian performance artist

- Born: March 10, 1955 (age 71); Saginaw, Michigan, United States
- Education: Kalamazoo College
- Writing career
- Notable works: Well of Horniness (1983), Clit Notes (1996)
- Notable awards: National Endowment for the Arts grants, Obie Award, Lambda Literary Award

Holly Hughes (born March 10, 1955) is an American lesbian performance artist.

She began as a feminist painter in New York City but is best known for being one of the NEA Four who were denied funding from the National Endowment for the Arts, and for her work with the WOW Café Theater. Her plays explore sexuality, body image, and the female mind. She is the recipient of several awards, including the Lambda Literary Award for Drama and an Obie Award. She is a professor in the theater and drama department at the University of Michigan School of Art & Design.

== Biography ==
Born in Saginaw, Michigan, Hughes graduated from Kalamazoo College in 1977 and moved to New York City two years later to become a feminist painter. She worked as a waitress to support herself but felt unfulfilled. During that time, she saw a poster promoting a "Double X-rated Christmas party" to be held in the basement of a Catholic church. There she found lesbian strippers, kissing booths, and a highly sexual atmosphere. She then attended many such parties and became involved with the group running them, the WOW Café. Hughes' first performance at the WOW Café was in the early 1980s with a piece called "My Life as a Glamour Don't", about various fashion mistakes. She followed this up with "Shrimp in a Basket" and then her breakthrough Well of Horniness (1983).

Hughes wrote, directed and performed a play called Dress Suits to Hire in 1987. Critic Stephen Holden reviewed the play: "While Ms. Hughes's more poetic writing recalls Sam Shepard, the campy B-movie side of her sensibility shows her to be equally in tune with John Waters's movies and Charles Busch's drag extravaganzas." In 1990, Hughes earned national attention as one of the so-called NEA Four, artists whose funding from the National Endowment for the Arts was vetoed.

In 1994, Hughes received a Special Citation Obie Award.

In 1996, Hughes released one of her most famous and influential performances, Clit Notes. In this piece, Hughes performs several roles: herself at different ages, her mother, and various lovers that she has had. In 1998, Hughes co-edited an anthology of queer solo performance with David Roman called O Solo Homo: The New Queer Performance, which included her own Clit Notes.

Hughes was a finalist for the Lambda Literary Award for Drama in 1997 for Clit Notes, and won the award in 1999 for O Solo Homo.

In February 2017, Hughes organized a cabaret-style series of performance events protesting the newly elected Donald Trump's presidency, entitled "Not My President's Day". These events, which were organized by participants in over sixty cities, including Ann Arbor, Brno, Chicago, Brooklyn, Gateshead, and San Jose, raised funds for organizations such as Planned Parenthood and the American Civil Liberties Union. Most of the events used variants of the names "Not My President's Day" or "Bad and Nasty".

Hughes works as a professor at the University of Michigan's School of Art & Design. In 2010, she received a Guggenheim Fellowship.

== Personal life ==
Hughes is in a long-term relationship with cultural anthropologist Esther Newton. They married in 2015.

== Bibliography ==
- The Well of Horniness (1983)
- The Lady Dick (1984)
- Dress Suits to Hire (1987)
- World Without End (1989)
- Clit Notes (1996)
- O Solo Homo (1998), edited with David Román
- Animal Acts: Performing Species Today, edited with Una Chaudhuri (2010)
- Memories of the Revolution: The First Ten Years of the WOW Café Theater (2015), edited with Carmelita Tropicana and Jill Dolan

== See also ==
- NEA Four
- National Endowment for the Arts v. Finley
