= New George's =

American nightclub

Coordinates: 37.97294°N 122.52478°W

New George's was a nightclub and concert venue located in San Rafael, California. History of the venue dates back to the 1920s when it was a recreational pool hall. The building was remodeled into a nightclub in 1977 and named New George's until it closed in 2003. It was during this time many famous artists performed at the venue, including Jefferson Airplane, Grateful Dead, Santana, Huey Lewis and the News, Bonnie Raitt and Melissa Etheridge.
