= Lois Weaver =

American actress

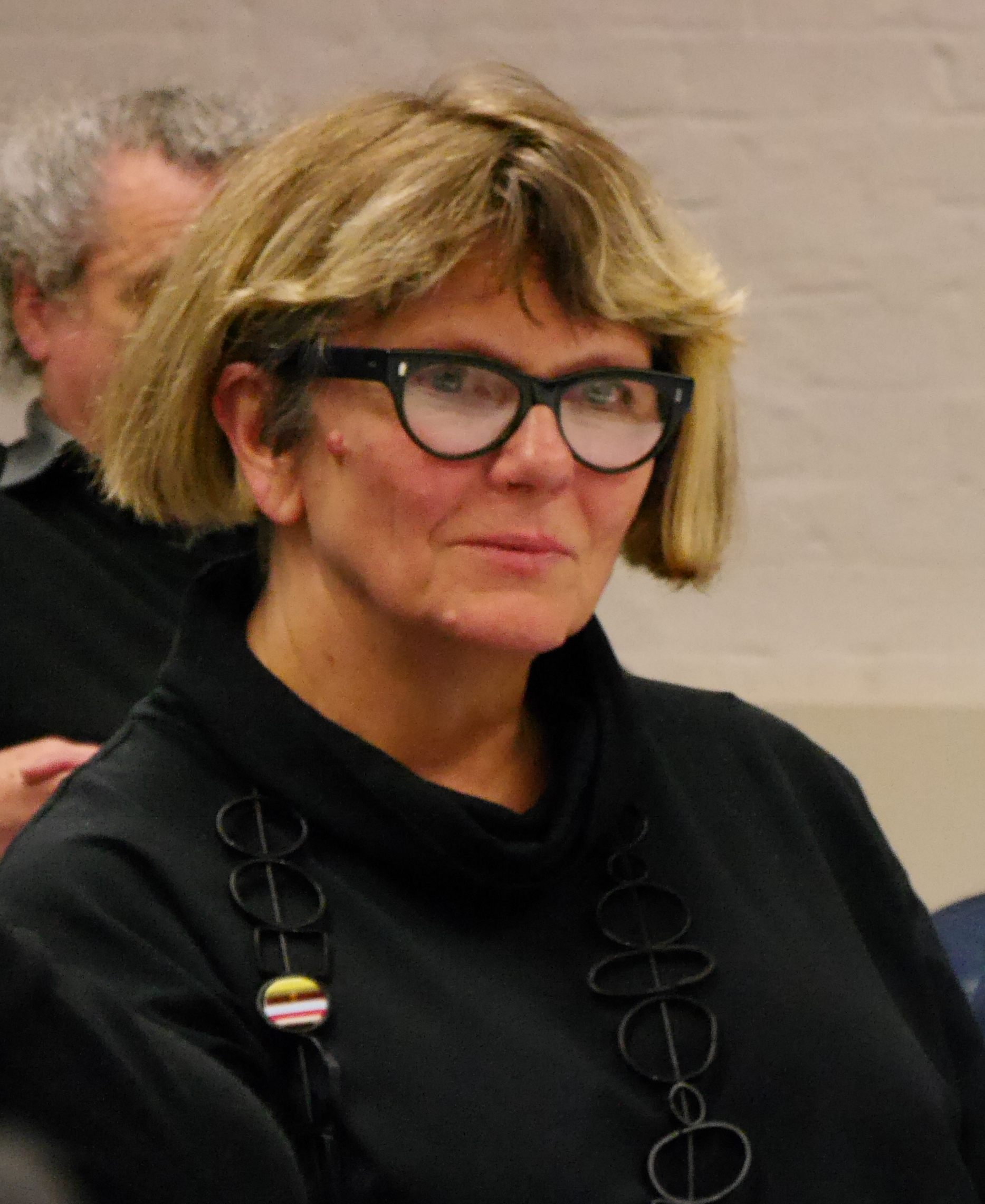
- Weaver in 2014
- Born: October 26, 1949 (age 76); Roanoke, Virginia, U.S.
- Education: Radford University, 1972
- Known for: performance, live art, public engagement, education
- Awards: Guggenheim Fellowship for Creative Arts, Wellcome Trust Engaging Science Fellowship, Edwin Booth Award, Innovative Theatre Achievement Award
- Website: http://www.split-britches.com/lois/

Lois Weaver (born October 26, 1949, Roanoke, Virginia) is a Guggenheim-winning American artist, activist, writer, director, and Professor of Contemporary Performance at Queen Mary University of London. She is currently a Wellcome Trust Fellow in Engaging Science.

Her work centers on feminism, human rights and possibilities for public participation. Active for over four decades, she is the founding member of significant New York theatre companies Spiderwoman Theater (1975), Split Britches (1980) and WOW (Women's One World Cafe) (1980). Weaver came to London to take on the role of artistic director for Gay Sweatshop Theatre Company in 1992. She lives in New York and London.

== Early life ==
Weaver was born in Roanoke, Virginia. As a child she began performing with the Mount Pleasant Southern Baptist Church. She graduated with degrees in theatre and education from the all women's college Radford College (later Radford University) in 1972. After graduating Weaver began involved in activism against the Vietnam War, moving to Baltimore to work for a peace and justice center. While in Baltimore, Weaver began working with the Baltimore Free Theatre and was exposed to a range of experimental theatre practices. In the mid 1970s, Weaver moved to New York where she worked in a fish market and in Special Education in public schools while pursuing a performance career.

== Performance ==
Weaver's theatre and performance practice spans collaborative and solo work. In 1974 Weaver met Muriel Miguel, who had worked with the Open Theatre, at the Theater for the New City. In 1975, Weaver, with Miguel and Miguel's sisters Lisa Mayo and Gloria Miguel, was a co-founder of feminist theatre company Spiderwoman Theatre, whose members focused on using their own stories to address gender roles, economic realities and violence in women's lives. Weaver helped develop the signature Spiderwoman approach to performance creation which they called 'storyweaving', combining improvisational techniques from the Open Theatre, the Hopi goddess of creation's lessons on weaving, movement, and personal stories. While on tour with Spiderwoman in Europe, Weaver and Peggy Shaw met in Amsterdam. Shaw was touring with Hot Peaches throughout Europe.

In 1980, along with Peggy Shaw and Deb Margolin, Weaver founded Split Britches, an award-winning company who use theatricality to create work that centers on lesbian and queer identities. Weaver has had productive collaborative relationships with theatre and performance artists Holly Hughes, Bloolips founded by Bette Bourne, Curious, and Stacy Makishi.

Weaver's work, both in her solo performances and her work with Split Britches, is known for its imaginative use of text and image, which are juxtaposed for both serious and comic ends. She mixes fact and fiction to create ambiguous forms of autobiography.

== Public engagement ==
Weaver's practice has a focus on public engagement, and performance as a means for public dialogue. Weaver was awarded a Wellcome Trust Engaging Science Fellowship to continue this work in 2016. This practice is part of a larger trend in live art toward social engagement, and created a website www.split-britches.com/lois

=== Performance ===
Through her solo performance work and her work as the Artistic Director of Split Britches, Weaver's performance practice incorporates public engagement as both a method of creation and performance. Dialogic methods are incorporated into the creation process, through extensive workshops and conversations with target groups. Recent performances like Weaver's solo show What Tammy Needs to Know About Getting Old and Having Sex and the Split Britches performance Unexploded Ordnances (UXO) involve audience participation as an integral component. Recent engagement and performance work has focused on elders and age related issues.

=== Curation ===
Weaver's curatorial work focuses on feminist practice and non-hierarchical alternatives to existing social structures. This work includes expanded opportunities to emerging artists and under-represented groups in the arts, and has resulted in projects like the AiR Project and Peopling the Palace Festival at Queen Mary, University of London.

=== Social Design ===
Weaver's social design work is housed in the Public Address Systems project, which creates hospitable spaces for open conversation. This project has three strands, Performance, Place, and the Everyday, and has many forms including the Long Table, the Porch Sitting, the Care Café, Domestic Terrorism, the Card Table, the Library of Performing Rights, FeMUSEum, the Manifesto Room, Performing the Issue, Performing the Persona, and Performing as Methodology. All of Weaver's public engagement practice is considered open-source, and protocols are published on the Public Address Systems website. Additionally, Weaver has developed several projects like Democratizing Technology and Staging Human Rights.

== Filmography ==
- She Must Be Seeing Things (1987), as Jo
