= Julie Bovasso =

American actress (1930–1991)

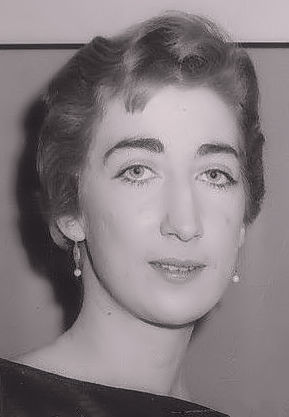
- Bovasso in 1956
- Born: Julia Anne Bovasso; August 1, 1930; Brooklyn, New York, U.S.
- Died: September 14, 1991 (aged 61); New York City, U.S.
- Occupation: Actress
- Years active: 1958–1991
- Spouse: George Earl Ortman

Julia Anne Bovasso (August 1, 1930 – September 14, 1991) was an American actress of stage, screen, and television, as well as a playwright.

== Life and career ==
Bovasso was born in Brooklyn, New York on August 1, 1930, and raised in the Bensonhurst neighborhood of this borough, the daughter of Angela Mary (née Padovani) and Bernard Michael Bovasso, a teamster. She was Albanian-Italian-American.

She attended The High School of Music & Art in Manhattan.

Bovasso appeared in numerous films, including Saturday Night Fever (1977) as Florence Manero, the mother of John Travolta's character, Tony Manero. She reprised the role in the film's 1983 sequel Staying Alive. Before Saturday Night Fever, she appeared in the 1970 Otto Preminger film Tell Me That You Love Me, Junie Moon.

In addition to Staying Alive, she was in a number of films in the 1980s, including Willie & Phil (1980), The Verdict (1982), Daniel (1983), Off Beat (1986), Wise Guys (1986), Moonstruck (1987). In the 1990s, Bovasso was seen in Betsy's Wedding (1990) and My Blue Heaven (1990).

On-stage, Bavasso wrote and appeared in avant-garde productions off-Broadway such as Jean Genet's The Maids. For the latter, she won the first Best Actress Obie (Off-Broadway) Award in 1956, presented to her by Shelley Winters.

Before her film work, Bovasso established the experimental Tempo Playhouse at 4 St. Marks Place in Manhattan during the 1950s. There, she introduced works of the Theater of the Absurd, including works by the playwrights Jean Genet, Eugene Ionesco and Michel de Ghelderode, to the professional theater in the United States.

Bovasso also performed with The Living Theater and had a longstanding relationship with La Mama Experimental Theatre Club. From 1968 to 1975, she directed many of her own original works at La MaMa, including Gloria and Esperanza, Schubert's Last Serenade, The Moondreamers, Standard Safety, and The Nothing Kid.

In addition to her work as a director and actor, her playwriting credits include the four-hour play Gloria and Esperanza, which Village Voice theatre critic Jerry Tallmer described as "a miracle, a mythopoetic fireworks display." A sought-after acting coach, Bovasso was known as an exacting instructor and her private New York workshops regularly included prominent performers. As per the DVD commentary, Bovasso coached both Cher and Olympia Dukakis on their Brooklyn accents in the film Moonstruck.

In earlier performances, she played Rose Corelli Fraser in the short-lived soap opera From These Roots. She was fired from that show due to a disagreement with producers.

== Marriage ==
Bovasso was married to painter George Earl Ortman for 30 years until her death in 1991.

== Death ==
In September 1991, Bovasso died in New York City of cancer at age 61.

== Filmography ==
Year	Title	Role	Notes
1970	Tell Me That You Love Me, Junie Moon	Ramona	
1977	Saturday Night Fever	Flo Manero	
1980	Willie & Phil	Mrs. D'Amico	
1982	The Verdict	Maureen Rooney	
1983	Staying Alive	Flo Manero	
1983	Daniel	Frieda Stein	
1986	Off Beat	Mrs. Wareham	
1986	Wise Guys	Lil Dickstein	
1987	Moonstruck	Rita Cappomaggi	
1990	Betsy's Wedding	Grandma	
1990	My Blue Heaven	Vinnie's Mother	
1992	Article 99	Amelia Sturdeyvant	

== Selected theatrical credits ==
- Moon Dreamers
- Schubert's Last Serenade
- Gloria and Esperanza
- Monday on the Way to Mercury Island
