= Carmelita Tropicana =

Cuban-American stage and film lesbian actress

- Born: Alina Troyano; 1951 (age 74–75); Cuba
- Occupations: Actress, performance artist
- Website: carmelitatropicana.com

Alina Troyano, more commonly known as Carmelita Tropicana, is a Cuban-American stage and film lesbian actress who lives and works in New York City.

== Creation of Carmelita Tropicana ==
Alina Troyano developed Carmelita Tropicana in the 1980s. Troyano recalls herself participating in a stand-up comedy class at WOW Café Theatre despite being uncomfortable speaking about herself, deciding to perform through a fictional character instead, and spontaneously chose the name Carmelita Tropicana during a radio broadcast. Troyano says that Carmelita was openly lesbian before Alina herself was fully comfortable of being out.

== Career ==
Troyano burst onto New York's downtown performing arts scene in the 1980s with her alter ego, the spitfire Carmelita Tropicana and her counterpart, the irresistible archetypal Latin macho Pingalito Betancourt. She also has performed as Hernando Cortes's horse and la Cucaracha Martina from her childhood fairy tales in Cuba.

In Tropicana's work, humor and fantasy become subversive tools to rewrite history. In 1999, she received an Obie Award for “sustained excellence in performance” El Diario La Prensa, a daily Spanish-language newspaper, named Tropicana "One of the Most Notable Women of 1998".

Tropicana is the sister of the independent film director Ela Troyano, who directed Carmelita Tropicana: Your Kunst Is Your Waffen. Their collaboration on this film won them an award for best short film at the Berlin Film Festival in 1994. Both also form part of the alternative arts scene in the East Village and Lower East Side. Tropicana started her career in the early 1980s performing at the WOW Café Theater (a woman's theater collective) and now performs extensively in spaces such as Performance Space 122 and Dixon Place. In 2010, Tropicana served as a co-hostess to Vaginal Davis' performance piece "Speaking from the Diaphragm" at Performance Space 122. Tropicana often collaborates with her sister and with other performers such as Marga Gomez.

In 2024, Troyano collaborated with playwright Branden Jacobs-Jenkins on Give Me Carmelita Tropicana!, which premiered at Soho Repertory Theatre. Troyano had previously taught Jacobs-Jenkins at New York University, and they discussed working together in 2015. In 2016, they began to develop the play after receiving a grant. The original concept of the play was a conversation based performance inspired by My Dinner with André, but Jacobs-Jenkins did not want to perform. This made the project turn into a fantasy play featuring characters from Troyano's previous performances.

Tropicana is the author of a collection of performance pieces and short essays called I, Carmelita Tropicana: Performing between Cultures that includes four performance scripts, a screenplay, and three essays. Some of her work was featured in tatiana de la tierra's magazine Esto no tine nombre, which gave voice to Latina lesbians all over the world and published the artistic pieces of Latina lesbians like Tropicana's.

Tropicana's performances plays and videos have been presented at venues such as the Institute of Contemporary Art in London, Hebbel am Ufer in Berlin, Centre de Cultura Contemporanea in Barcelona, the Berlin International Film Festival, the New Museum of Contemporary Art in New York, the Mark Taper Forum's Kirk Douglas Theater in Los Angeles, Center for LGBTQ Studies in New York, and El Museo del Barrio in New York. Her work has received funding support from the Independent Television Service, the Jerome Foundation, and the Rockefeller Suitcase Fund. Other projects include Schwanze-Beast, a collaboration with filmmakers Ela Troyano and Susanne Sachsse, and El Comandante, based on her father who fought in the Cuban Revolution.

== Pingalito Betancourt ==
Pingalito Bentancourt is a recurring male persona performed by Troyano in drag. He is a character who is in love with Carmelita Tropicana, wanting to do anything for Carmelita. Troyano describes him as almost an alter ego to Carmelita. Troyano says that Pingalito lets her talk about Cuban culture from a male-centered perspective, calling him a populist. Pingalito uses ridiculous "facts" and uses them as though they were the truth about Cuba.

Scholars describe him as an exaggerated macho Cuban man, commonly associated with a cigar, swagger, confidence, and a very male-centered way of talking about Cuban culture. Katy Davy interprets him as a parody of Cuban machismo and masculinity, showing masculinity itself as something performed rather than natural. José Esteban Muñoz calls Pingalito Troyano's imitation of the Cuban "mchista" and treats Pingalito as an example of choteo because of his racial commentary to attack everyday Cuban racism.

== Criticism, analysis and interviews ==
The performance art of Carmelita Tropicana has received considerable critical attention from scholars of queer latinidad and performance art, most notably José Esteban Muñoz and Yvonne Yarbro-Bejarano.

In his text, Disidentifications, Muñoz uses the work of Carmelita Tropicana to illustrate the ways "camp" and "choteo" function as distinct comedic modes of disidentification. Muñoz argues that Carmelita's performances work with existing cultural images rather than simply accepting or rejecting them.

Muños also analyzed her use of animals as stand-ins for humans in With What Ass Does the Cockroach Sit? in his essay Performing the Bestiary. Using animals as characters and their symbolism occurs in several other works as well. La Fountain-Stokes also argues in the book Animal Acts: Performing Species Today that her animal and human characters allow Troyano to address many problems such as migration, political division between Havana and Miami, and queer relationships through humor. He describes the work as a rewriting of the Hispanic Caribbean Martina the Beautiful Cockroach folklore in the context of Cuban exile politics and the Elián González controversy.

Muñoz also contrasts Carmelita Tropicana's work with definitions of camp centered on white gay male culture, arguing that her Latina Lesbian camp provides a way of performing identity against dominant cultural pressures and responds to representations that have rendered lesbians, and Latinas invisible.

In her 2020 dissertation, Performing Exile: Cuban-American Women's Performance Art, Susana Rodríguez discusses a scene where Carmelita is served traditional Cuban foods such as black beans and yuca in order to help regain her memories. She also analyzes Troyano's recollection of eating American school lunches while holding her breath to avoid tasting the food. Rodríguez interprets these examples as showing how Cuban immigrants can adapt to American customs while maintaining their cultural identity.

Memories of the Revolution (1986) was a play written by Alina Troyano and Uzi Parnés. The play is set in a fictional revolution taking place in 1955 in Havana, rather than the Cuban Revolution of 1959. In her 2004 analysis, I. Carolina Caballero explains how the production uses projected images of Havana to represent memories of Cuba. In one scene, the characters run in place as if touring the city, with images of various locations projected behind them. She sees this technique as a way of challenging nostalgic representations of Cuban history.

Her work has also been cited in: From Bananas to Buttocks: The Latina Body in Popular Film and Culture, Selenidad: Selena, Latinos, and the Performance of Memory, José, Can You See?: Latinos on and Off Broadway, Virtual Gender: Fantasies of Subjectivity and Embodiment.

== Works ==
- Carmelita Tropicana: Your Kunst is Your Waffen. (Art is your weapon) (1994), Film. Cast: Carmelita Tropicana, Sophia Ramos, Annie Lobst, Livia Daza Paris. The film introduces Tropicana, a New York City Lower East Side performance artist, who is a political activist by day and nightclub entertainer by night. The film is a cultural dissection of stereotypes and blends different genres- the American musical, the Latino telenovela, with experimental film.The film has aired on PBS and presented in festivals including Europe, Latin America and Japan. Winner of the Berlin Film Festival Teddy Bear Award, Stolichnaya and Audience Award at the 18th International Gay and Lesbian Film Festival, San Francisco.
- Milk of Amnesia (1994), written and performed by Carmelita Tropicana, directed by Ela Troyano. Performance premier: Performance Space 122. Proust ate a Madeleine cookie and his childhood memories came rushing back; Carmelita ate a pork sandwich and she fell into a CUMMA – a collective unconscious memory appropriation attack. Milk of Amnesia is a travelogue that blends the persona of Carmelita with the more personal voice of her creator, and juxtaposes the memories of a horse in colonial Havana with that of a pig in Havana's modern day Special Period. Milk of Amnesia has toured Nationally and Internationally with last presentation at Yale World Performance Project 2007. Milk of Amnesia has appeared in many anthologies including the award-winning Oh Solo Homo edited by Holly Hughes and David Roman.
- Single Wet Female (2002), written by Carmelita Tropicana & Marga Gomez, directed by David Schweizer. Starring: Marga Gomez, Carmelita Tropicana, Murray Hill (on video). Presented at Performance Space 122, Throws Like a Girl Festival, Austin (2005) National Queer Arts Festival, S.F. (2002), Nominated for GLAAD Award. Single Wet Female combines film-noir satire with goofball socio-sexual performance. It is a spoof of the film cult classic Single White Female. Marga Gomez plays Margaret, a high femme Caucasian in a blonde wig, and Carmelita is Cammy, the uber butch who awakens her desire for plantains and merengue. The play includes video with drag king Murray Hill in the role of the boyfriend.
- With What Ass Does the Cockroach Sit? (2004), written and performed by Carmelita Tropicana, directed by David Schweizer. Commissioned and produced by INTAR Theatre, 2004. Presented at the University of Michigan, Syracuse University (2006), Mark Taper Forum's New Theater for Now Festival at the Kirk Douglas Theatre and DePaul University (2005) and at the Black and Latino Theatre Festival at Northwestern University (2008). With What Ass Does the Cockroach Sit? is a monologue that uses the saga of Elian Gonzalez, a shipwrecked Cuban boy, as a springboard to discuss Cuban politics from within and outside the island. Inspired by a beloved Latino fairy tale Perez y Martina by Pura Belpre the piece is a story of survival narrated by Martina, a street smart Cuban cucaracha, and Catalina, an imperious parrot owned by a singer of the Nueva Vista Social Club.
- The Box/Meine Box (2008), written and performed by Carmelita Tropicana, designed and directed by Ela Troyano. Presented at Location One, New York (2008), Joe's Pub, New York (2009), Camp Anti Camp Festival, Hebbel am Uffer, Berlin 2012. Performance Art. A refrigerator box moves. Afro Cuban aphorisms in Spanish, English or German are given along with chocolate kisses and pet stories. It is a piece inspired by Nayland Blake's exhibition at Location One curated by Maura Reilly.
- Post Plastica (2012), written by Carmelita Tropicana and Ela Troyano, directed by Ela Troyano. Commissioned by Performance Space 122 presented at El Museo del Barrio. Cast (theatre): Carmelita Tropicana, Becca Blackwell, Erin Markey. Part live performance, part film, part diva, part botox, Post Plastica a glimpse into a future in which celebrity culture has pitched a battle between the primacy of virtual and artistic lives; in which revolutionaries keep secret bees underground; and in which a half-woman half-bear scientist battles the despotic ruling CEO.
- Recycling Atlantis (2014), live exhibition at 80WSE in New York by Uzi Parnes, Carmelita Tropicana, and Ela Troyano. Celebrated artist Jack Smith.
- Schwanze-Beast (2015), written by Carmelita Tropicana and Ela Troyano, with collaboration from Susanne Sachsse. Commissioned and presented by the Vermont Performance Lab. Includes performance, scientific lecture, and installation. It looks at a future and considers animals and their civil rights.
- Memories of the Revolution: The First Ten Years of the WOW Cafe (2016), with Holly Hughes (performance artist) and Jill Dolan.
- Give Me Carmelita Tropicana! (2024), co-written by Carmelita Tropicana and Branden Jacobs-Jenkins, directed by Eric Ting, starring Carmelita Tropicana, Octavia Chavez-Richmond, Ugo Chukwu, Will Dagger, Keren Lugo. Debuted at Soho Repertory Theatre in 2024, running from October 23 - December 22. In the play, the character of Branden Jacobs-Jenkins tries to buy the character of Carmelita Tropicana as Troyano considers retiring. The story starts at a law firm and then takes you to Phantasmagoria, which is a fantasy world where characters from previous shows of Troyano, like Pingalito Bentacourt, Arriero, and Martina the cockroach live.
- Chicas 2000 (1997), is a science fiction comedy which was commissioned by Dixon Place for the Toyota Comedy Festival. The play tells the story of Carmelita, a nightclub performer who is detained when the authorities find out that she has a fictitious gene linked to chusma, a term that refers to the behaviors of lower classes. She is then taken to a rehabilitation center where they try to modify her behaviors. In an interview with Kathleen McHugh in 2013, Troyano said that the play examines racial and class stereotypes, and gentrification of New York’s Lower East Side using humor and science fiction.

== Awards ==
- José Muñoz Award, 2021, CLAGS: The Center for LGBTQ Studies at the CUNY Graduate Center
- Creative Capital award, 2016.
- Anonymous Was a Woman, 2005.
- Obie for Sustained Excellence in Performance, 1999.
