= Kevin Loring =

Canadian playwright and actor

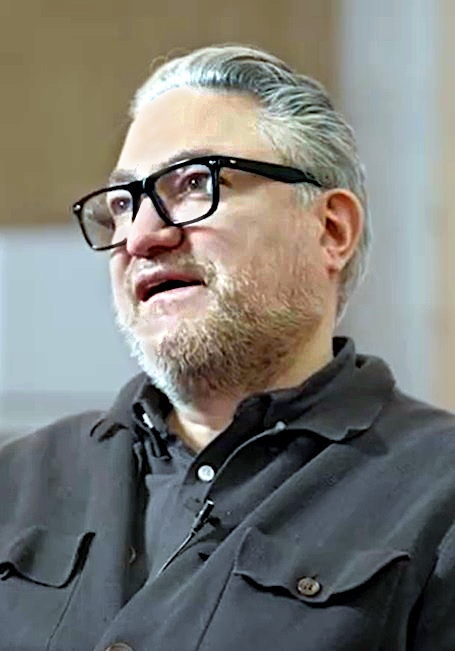
- Loring in 2024
- Born: November 24, 1974 (age 51); Lytton, British Columbia, Canada
- Education: Studio 58
- Occupations: playwright, actor
- Writing career
- Period: 2003–present
- Notable work: Where the Blood Mixes

Kevin Loring (born November 24, 1974) is a Canadian playwright and actor. As a playwright, he won the Governor General's Award for English-language drama, the Herman Voaden Playwriting Competition and the Jessie Richardson Award for Outstanding Original Script, and was nominated for the Dora Mavor Moore Award for Outstanding New Play, for Where the Blood Mixes in 2009. His 2019 play, Thanks for Giving, was short-listed for the Governor General's Award for Drama. In June 2021, Kevin Loring received an honorary doctorate from the University of Ottawa's Faculty of Arts.

As an actor, his credits include roles in the television series Bones of Crows, Da Vinci's Inquest, Arctic Air and Health Nutz, and the film Pathfinder, as well as stage roles including Michel Tremblay's Saint Carmen of the Main, George Ryga's The Ecstasy of Rita Joe and Edmund in an all-First Nations production of William Shakespeare's King Lear at the National Arts Centre in 2012. Loring was a writer and co-producer for the documentary Canyon War: The Untold Story in 2009 and is featured in the 2021 documentary series British Columbia: An Untold History speaking about the legacy and impact of the Fraser Canyon War.

A Nlaka'pamux from the Lytton First Nation in British Columbia, Loring first began his studies at Cariboo College known now as Thompson Rivers University (TRU). He was a 1997 university transfer student enrolled in an arts program. In 2015, TRU recognized Loring as a distinguished alumni awarding him with the Arts and Culture Award, in recognition of his impact on Canadian arts and culture as a playwright, actor, instructor, and mentor. Loring then studied theatre at the prestigious Studio 58 theatre program at Langara College until 2000. In June 2017, Loring was selected by the Hnatyshyn Foundation as a recipient of the REVEAL Indigenous Arts Award, which honours Indigenous Canadian artists across disciplines. Kevin Loring created the Songs of the Land Project in collaboration with five separate organizations in his home community. This project aimed to bring traditional Nlaka'pamux songs and stories, which were recorded on wax cylinders at the beginning of the 20th century by anthropologist James Teit, to contemporary audiences. This work informed The Battle of the Birds, a play which debuted at the Lytton River Festival in 2015, and which was restaged in Ottawa in 2019. It also spurred The Boy Who Was Abandoned, a second production which debuted in Lytton in September 2016.

On June 15, 2017, Loring was announced as the first artistic director for Indigenous Theatre at the National Arts Centre in Ottawa (NAC). In early 2019, the NAC was denied $3.5 million dollars of requested federal funding, a decision which would have a significant impact on the inaugural season. The first production, "The Unnatural and Accidental Women" by Métis playwright Marie Clements opened on September 11, 2019.

== Works ==
- Where the Blood Mixes (Talonbooks, 2009)
- Native Americans: A Visual Exploration [introduction only] (Annick Press, 2013), by Shaker Paleja
- Thanks for Giving (Talonbooks, 2019)
- Little Red Warrior and His Lawyer: A Trickster Land Claim Fable (Talonbooks, 2022)
- Lytton: Climate Change, Colonialism and Life Before the Fire (Penguin Random House Canada, 2024)
