= Sid Bobb =

Canadian television personality

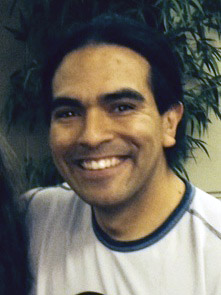
- Bobb in 2014
- Occupations: Actor; presenter
- Mother: Lee Maracle
- Relatives: Columpa Bobb (sister)
- Awards: Gemini Award (2009)
- Website: https://www.aanmitaagzi.net/about/

Sid Bobb is a Canadian actor and television presenter. He is the co-artistic director at Aanmitaagzi in North Bay, Ontario and an instructor at the Centre for Indigenous Theatre. From 2007 to 2016, he, along with Patty Sullivan, hosted the programming block Kids' CBC. Bobb is of Coast Salish ancestry and has family roots in the Sto:lo First Nations.

== Early life, personal life and education ==
Bobb is originally from the Vancouver Island area located in British Columbia. Bobb is the child of Raymond Bobb and Indigenous author Lee Maracle. Other notable members of his family are his sister, actress Columpa Bobb, his aunt, politician Joan Phillip, and his great-grandfather, Tsleil-Waututh Nation Chief and actor Dan George.

Bobb is a graduate of the University of Toronto's sociology and drama programs (2001) and attended the Second City school of training, the Banff Centre for the Arts' Aboriginal Dance Project and the Centre for Indigenous Theatre.

Bobb is currently based in North Bay, Ontario, and the father of two children.

== Career ==
Bobb has been a professional actor since 1993. Sid Bobb has performed in Canada's largest theatres across the country; storytelling, in plays, and dancing. For three seasons, he was co-host of the internationally broadcast Canadian Geographic Kids, and from 2007 to 2016 he co-hosted Kids' CBC with Patty Sullivan.

In 2007, Bobb, alongside his wife Penny Couchie, founded Aanmitaagzi in Penny's home community of Nipissing First Nation. Since then Bobb has been Co-Artistic Director of Aanmitaagzi. In this role Bobb has been a part of multiple theatrical productions with Aanmitaagzi and other studios including Spiderwoman theater and Centre for Indigenous Theatre.

== Filmography ==
=== Film ===
- The Pathfinder (1998) - Young Warrior
- Song of Hiawatha (1997) - Young Huron Warrior
- O-Getche Tahk: The Lost Warriors (2015) - Wasageshik
- Bloodlines (2025) - Announcer

=== Television ===
- Canada: A People's History (2000) - Taignoagny (Season 1, Episode 1 "When the World Began")
- Relic Hunter (2002) - Shaman (Season 3, Episode 13 "Fire in the Sky"); Anasazi Man (Season 3, Episode 16 "Under the Ice")
- Kids' CBC (2007-2016) - Host
- Hard Rock Medical (2018) - Fergus (Episodes "White Coats" and "Too Close for Comfort")

=== Theatre ===
- Stories of Nipissing (2006–08)
- Women In Violence II (2012)
- When Will You Rage? (2013)
- Dances of Resistance (2012 – 2014)
- Serpent People (2015 – 2018)
- That's Not Funny (2016)
- Material Witness (2016 – 2019)
- Where Does Art Begin? (2019 – 2020)
- Tonto’s Nephews (2004 - 2011; 2024)
- All My R(el)ations (2023-2026)
