= Gilbert Paul Jordan =

Canadian serial killer (1931–2006)

- Born: Gilbert Paul Elsie; December 12, 1931; Vancouver, British Columbia, Canada
- Died: July 7, 2006 (aged 74); Victoria, British Columbia, Canada
- Other names: The Boozing Barber; Paul Pearce; Gilbert Paul Elsie
- Conviction: Manslaughter
- Penalty: 15 years imprisonment; commuted to 9 years imprisonment

Details
- Victims: 1 (Convicted; linked to 8–10 more)
- Span of crimes: 1965–c. 2004
- Country: Canada
- Locations: British Columbia, Saskatchewan

Gilbert Paul Jordan (né Elsie; December 12, 1931 – July 7, 2006), known as The Boozing Barber, was a Canadian serial killer who is believed to have committed the so-called "alcohol murders" in Vancouver, British Columbia.

== Background ==
Jordan, a former barber, was linked to the deaths of between eight and ten women between 1965 and 1988; he was the first Canadian known to use alcohol as a murder weapon. Jordan's lengthy criminal record started in 1952 and includes convictions for rape, indecent assault, abduction, hit and run, drunk driving and car theft.

In 1976, Jordan was examined by Dr. Tibor Bezeredi as part of a court proceeding. Bezeredi diagnosed Jordan as having an antisocial personality, defined by Bezeredi as "a person whose conduct is maladjusted in terms of social behaviour; disregard for the rights of others which often results in unlawful activities".

== Killings ==
Jordan is thought to have begun serial killing in 1965. He is considered a serial killer as he was linked to the deaths of between eight and ten women, but was only convicted in the manslaughter death of one woman. His victims were First Nations women in Vancouver's Downtown Eastside. Typically he would find women in bars, and buy them drinks, or pay them for sex and encourage them to drink with him. When they passed out, he would pour liquor down their throats. The resulting deaths were reported as alcohol poisoning and police paid little attention, because some of his victims suffered from alcoholism. Although the newspapers often described the women as prostitutes, not all were involved in prostitution. Jordan was known to drink more than 50 ounces (1.42 litres) of vodka each day.

The first woman known to have died by alcohol poisoning while in Jordan's company was in 1965. As would become a pattern, a switchboard operator, Ivy Rose, was found naked and dead in a Vancouver hotel. Her blood alcohol level was 0.51. No charges were laid.

Court proceedings show "he sought out approximately 200 women per year for binge-drinking episodes covering the period from 1980 to 1988. He was also looking for sexual gratification." Further, the Crown provided evidence that Jordan was linked to the deaths of six other First Nations women. Similar fact evidence showed Jordan had been with the following women at the time of their deaths:

- Mary Johnson, November 30, 1980, at the Aylmer Hotel, Blood alcohol level: .34
- Barbara Paul, September 11, 1981, at the Glenaird Hotel, Blood alcohol level: .41
- Mary Johns, July 30, 1982, at 2503 Kingsway (his barbershop) Blood alcohol level: .76
- Patricia Thomas, December 15, 1984, at 2503 Kingsway (his barbershop) Blood alcohol level: .51
- Patricia Andrew, June 28, 1985, at 2503 Kingsway (his barbershop) Blood alcohol level: .79
- Vera Harry, November 19, 1986, at the Clifton Hotel, Blood alcohol level: .04

== Investigation ==
On October 12, 1987, Vanessa Lee Buckner was found naked on the floor of the Niagara Hotel after a night of drinking with Jordan. There is some debate regarding the victim. Some sources indicate that she was a white woman, not a heavy drinker, nor was she a prostitute. However, official court records describe Buckner's death as the result of Jordan "supplying a lethal amount of liquor to a female alcoholic, who died as a result". Buckner had recently lost custody of her newborn baby, who had been born with a drug dependency. She "was an alcoholic and a taker of various kinds of drugs." Jordan's fingerprints were found and linked to Buckner's death. A month after her death, another woman, Edna Shade, was found dead in another hotel.

After being questioned, Jordan was not charged with any crime related to Buckner's death. However, police initiated surveillance on Jordan. Between October 12 and November 26, 1987, police watched him "search out native Indian women in the skid row area of Vancouver. On four different occasions they [the police] rescued the woman involved before she too became a victim". Those women were:

- Rosemary Wilson, November 20, 1987, at the Balmoral Hotel, Blood alcohol level: .52
- Verna Chartrand, November 21, 1987, at the Pacific Hotel, Blood alcohol level: .43
- Sheila Joe, November 25, 1987, at the Rainbow Hotel, Blood alcohol level: unknown
- Mabel Olson, November 26, 1987, at the Pacific Hotel, Blood alcohol level: unknown

According to the court records, police listening outside the hotel rooms heard Jordan say such things as:

"Have a drink, down the hatch baby, 20 bucks if you drink it right down; see if you're a real woman; finish that drink, finish that drink, down the hatch hurry, right down; you need another drink, I'll give you 50 bucks if you can take it; I'll give you 10, 20, 50 dollars, whatever you want, come on I want to see you get it all down; you get it right down, I'll give you the 50 bucks and the 13 bucks; I'll give you 50 bucks. I told you that. If you finish that I'll give you $75; finish your drink, I'll give you $20 ..."

== Convictions and arrests ==
This similar fact evidence was important in the 1988 trial. Jordan was tried before a judge alone. Justice Bouck found Jordan guilty of manslaughter in the death of Buckner. He was sentenced to fifteen years in prison, but that was reduced to nine years on appeal.

Jordan served six years for the manslaughter conviction. After his release, he was placed on probation which restricted him to Vancouver Island. In June 2000, he was charged with sexual assault, assault, negligence causing bodily harm and administering a noxious substance—alcohol. In 2000, Jordan attempted to change his name to Paul Pearce. At the time, a name change in British Columbia did not require fingerprinting or a criminal check. After the loophole was closed, he dropped the application.

Jordan was arrested again, in 2002, for breach of probation because he was found drinking, and in the presence of a woman while in possession of alcohol. He was found guilty and sentenced to 15 months in jail, followed by three years' probation and strict conditions.

However, on August 11, 2004, he was arrested in Winnipeg for violating that probation order for an incident at the York Hotel in Swift Current, Saskatchewan, August 9, 2004. He had been identified as being a party to binge drinking with Barb Burkley. Burkley was a long term resident of the hotel and had a serious drinking problem. Burkley was taken to the hospital by her friend and hotel employee, Cathy Waddington, who had discovered Burkley in very bad condition. Waddington identified Jordan as being there, but he was acquitted of those charges in 2005. Upon his release, police issued a public warning.

Jordan died in 2006.

=== Police warning ===
On February 3, 2005, the Saanich Police Department issued an alert warning the public to be cautious of the recently released Jordan:

JORDAN, Gilbert Paul, age 73, is the subject of this alert. JORDAN is 175cm (5'9") tall and weighs 79kgs (174lbs) [sic]. He is partially bald with grey hair and a grey goatee. He has blue eyes and wears glasses. JORDAN is currently in the Victoria area, but has no fixed address. JORDAN has a significant criminal record including manslaughter and indecent assault of a female. He uses alcohol to lure his victims. JORDAN's target victim group is adult females. JORDAN is subject to court ordered conditions including:

- Abstain absolutely from the consumption of alcohol.
- Not to be in the company of any female person or persons in any place where alcohol is being either consumed or possessed by that person or persons.

If you observe the subject in violation of any of the above conditions please call the Saanich Police Department at 475-4321, 911 or your local police agency. If you have questions concerning the public notification process please contact the BC Corrections Branch at 250-387-6366.

== Cultural impact ==
Jordan was the subject of the 1997 Canadian television program Exhibit A: Secrets of Forensic Science in an episode called "Dead Drunk". The program described the forensic work used to convict him in 1988.

A dramatization, The Unnatural and Accidental Women, was written by Vancouver playwright Marie Clements and performed in, among other places, Buddies in Bad Times Theatre in Toronto (2004). In the play, the writer focused on the story of the victims in an attempt to redress the failure of the news media to do so.

Clements later adapted her play into the screenplay for the feature film Unnatural & Accidental, which premiered at the 2006 Toronto International Film Festival.

Jordan and his crimes served as inspiration for the first several episodes of Da Vinci's Inquest. The crime series, set in Vancouver, portrayed a serial killer using alcohol as a murder weapon and stalking women involved in prostitution. The portrayal departed from the facts by having the killer die before he could be arrested; he was murdered by the brother of one of his victims, tipped to his identity by a detective.

== See also ==
- List of serial killers by country
- List of serial killers by number of victims
- Missing and Murdered Indigenous Women
- Robert Pickton
