= Muriel Miguel =

American playwright and actor (1943–2017)

- Born: August 15, 1937 (age 89); New York City, U.S.
- Occupations: Director; Choreographer; Playwright; Actor; Educator
- Parent: Elmira Miguel
- Website: www.spiderwomantheater.org

Muriel Miguel (born August 15 1937) is a Native American director, choreographer, playwright, actor and educator. She is of Guna and Rappahannock ancestry and was born and grew up in Brooklyn, New York. In 1976, she founded the Spiderwoman Theater with her sisters, Gloria Miguel and Lisa Mayo (born Elizabeth Miguel). The Spiderwoman Theater was the first Native American women's theater troupe to gain international recognition, and remains the longest continuous running Native American female performance group. Miguel has directed nearly all of the Spiderwoman Theater's shows since their debut in 1976, and currently serves as its artistic director.

== Early life ==
Miguel was born in Brooklyn, New York, the youngest of three sisters. Elmira Miguel, her mother, was a member of the Rappahannock tribe of Virginia. Her father was a Guna from islands in Guna Yala, off the coast of Panama.

In elementary school, she was taught that Native American culture was "dead." In response to this, she created the Little Eagles with her friend Louis Mofsie. The Little Eagles unified Native children and urged them to embrace their culture. They met in a church basement and performed traditional songs and dances. The Little Eagles remains active in New York City, and is now known as the Thunderbird American Indian Dancers.

Miguel went on to study modern dance with Alwin Nickolais, Erick Hawkins and Jean Erdman. She was an original member of Joseph Chaikin's Open Theater along with Sam Shepard, Megan Terry, Peter Feldman, and Chaikin himself.

== Career ==
=== The Spiderwoman Theater ===
In the early 1970s, Miguel began working with women of diverse backgrounds and prioritized storytelling through "sound, movement, moments, and breath." She asked Lois Weaver and Josephine Mofsie Tarrant for personal stories and created a piece combining Weaver's dream of making love to Jesus, Tarrant's story about the Hopi Goddess, the Spider Woman, and Miguel's story about the Sun Dance ceremony. Determined to connect their stories together, Miguel engaged in the process of storyweaving, unifying the three stories into one performance. This method of storyweaving would become a pillar of Miguel's style.

In 1976, Miguel's sisters, Lisa Mayo and Gloria Miguel joined the group. Along with Pam Verge, and Lois Weaver, the sisters formed the Spiderwoman Theater. Much of their focus was centered on questioning gender roles, cultural stereotypes. Aiming to bring the issue of violence against women to light, their first work, Women in Violence, premiered at Washington Square Methodist Church. Muriel wanted to work with the anger and complex emotions regarding the "Indian situation," the Indian Movement, and the violence experienced throughout her life. They took Women in Violence to the Nancy Festival in France, becoming the first feminist theater group to participate. In 1977, they debuted their second play, The Lysistrata Numbah!, storyweaving Aristophanes' Lysistrata with stories from the different group members.

The group eventually split, with Weaver leaving to create the performance troupe Split Britches; the three sisters continued creating pieces as the Spiderwoman Theater. As a theatre and performance group, the sisters recognized the need for Indigenous stories to be told and heard. Utilizing their signature storyweaving methodology, they became a pillar in Indigenous arts and theater. Other shows put on included Trilogy: Friday Night Jealousy, My Sister Ate Dirt (1978), Cabaret: An Evening of Disgusting Songs and Pukey Images (1979), Oh, What a Life (1980), The Fittin' Room (1980), Sun, Moon and Feather & Split Britches (1981), I'll Be Right Back (1982), and many others. A majority of these pieces aimed to question and challenge gender roles, racism, classism, and sexual oppression.

Miguel continues to direct pieces for the theater and serves as its artistic director.

=== Teaching career ===
Miguel was an assistant professor of drama at Bard College, and an instructor of Indigenous Performance and Program Director for the Aboriginal Dance Program at The Banff Centre for the Arts for seven years. Miguel also worked with inner-city Native youth on HIV issues, and developed shows for The Minnesota Native American AIDS Task Force (now known as The Indigenous Peoples Task Force). She works as an instructor of Indigenous Performance at the Centre for Indigenous Theatre (CIT), also serving as a Program Director for the CIT's three-week summer intensive. Miguel also facilitates Storyweaving Workshops across the US, Canada, and Europe.

=== Writing and Choreography ===
Miguel choreographed Throw Away Kids and She Knew She Was She for the Aboriginal Dance Program at the Banff Centre. Miguel is also known for her one-woman shows, including Hot' N' Soft, Trail of the Otter and most recently Red Mother. Hot' N' Soft, included in the anthology Two-Spirit Acts: Queer Indigenous Performances, is notable for its themes of lesbianism within the Indigenous community. A lesbian erotica and trickster story, Hot 'N' Soft touches on taboos within the Native lesbian community, citing her own sexual awakening and experiences throughout the piece. Writing this piece, Miguel asserts her identity within the two-spirit, lesbian, and queer Indigenous communities.

=== Other ===
In 2019, Miguel directed Marie Clements' play The Unnatural and Accidental Women as the first presentation of Canada's National Arts Centre's Indigenous Theatre department.

== Honors ==
In 1997, Miguel and her sisters were the founding contributors to the Native American Women Playwrights Archive at Miami University in Oxford, Ohio. Consequently, they received honorary Doctorates of Fine Arts at Miami University for their life's work and contribution to theater. Additionally, she was selected for the Native and Hawaiian Women of Hope poster by Bread and Roses International Union's Bread and Roses Center that same year. In 2003, Miguel was the recipient of the first Lipinsky Residency (feminist in residence) for San Diego State University Women's Studies Department. In 2010, Miguel and her sisters received the Lifetime Achievement Award from the Women's Caucus for Art.

Miguel is also a member of the National Theatre Conference and in 2015 attended the Rauschenberg Residency. In 2016, Miguel was named a Guggenheim Fellow. In 2018, Muriel received an award of $275,000 via the 2018 Duke Awards. She received the 2019 Distinguished Career Award at the Southeastern Theatre Conference. Miguel was featured in the 2022 book 50 Key Figures in Queer US Theatre, in a chapter written by theatre scholar Christy Stanlake.
