= Samurai Cowboy =

1993 film

- Directed by: Michael Keusch
- Written by: Dave Hunsaker; Rick Ponte
- Produced by: Mike Erwin; J. Max Kirishima
- Starring: Hiromi Go; Catherine Mary Stewart; Robert Conrad; Matt McCoy; Conchata Ferrell
- Distributed by: Saban Entertainment
- Release date: February 1, 1994
- Running time: 101 minutes
- Country: Canada
- Language: English

Samurai Cowboy is a film shot in conjunction with the Alberta Motion Picture Development Corporation, and Monarch Home video. The film was shot in 1993 at Waterton Lakes National Park, Alberta. The film was directed by Canadian director Michael Keusch. For the director Michael Keusch, a graduate of the film program at the Southern Alberta Institute of Technology, the film was a chance to revisit the province he grew up in.

The screenplay was written by Dave Hunsaker and Rick Pont, and was created with a budget of 2 million Canadian dollars. The film stars main character Hiromi Go as the Japanese business man turned cowboy. Also starring in the film were Robert Conrad, Matt McCoy, Catherine Mary Stewart and Conchata Ferrell.

== Plot ==
The film follows a Japanese businessman named Yutaka Sato (Hiromi Go), a workaholic who lives in Tokyo, Japan. After the death of his best friend from a heart attack due to permanent stress at work, Sato becomes disillusioned with the busy Tokyo lifestyle that he leads. Sato then decides to fulfill his lifelong dream of living in the Wild West in America, and moves to Montana to follow a childhood dream of becoming a cattle rancher.

In Montana, Sato meets a group of five cowboys that end up becoming his friend group. One is an old cowboy named Gabe McBride (Robert Conrad); one is a cowgirl/veterinarian named Jessie Collins (Catherine Mary Stewart); one is an Aboriginal (Native Canadian) cowboy who faces discrimination (Byron Chief-Moon); and a country singer cowboy (Bradley M. Rapier). Along the way these cowboys become his friends and help him fight against the evil Colt Wingate. Meanwhile, Jessie Collins becomes Sato's love interest in the film.

However, once he arrives at the ranch he finds out it is due for demolition and the welcome he receives from the town is less than friendly. Cattle rancher Colt Wingate, played by Matt McCoy, is pitted against newcomer Sato as Wingate wants to buy Sato's land in order to flood the valley and build a dam. In the end, Sato wins against Colt Wingate and is able to fulfill his lifetime-long dream of living on a ranch in the Wild Wild West.

== Cast ==
- Hiromi Go as Yutaka Sato
- Catherine Mary Stewart as Jessie Collins
- Robert Conrad as Gabe McBride
- Matt McCoy as Colt Wingate
- Conchata Ferrell as Bobbi Bob Pickette
- Ian Tyson as T.J. Welsh
- Byron Chief-Moon as Jack Eagle Eye
- Bradley M. Rapier as C.C. Ryder
- Mark Acheson as Flint Clayton
- Tom Glass as Ben
- Rick Harvey as Gil
- Owen Smith as Mudslinger #1
- Ehud Ellman as Mudslinger #2
- Tom Bonny as Mudslinger #3
- Harold Ludwig as American Businessman
- Duncan Callander as Bus Driver
- J. Max Kirishima as Goro Date (credited as Max Kirishima)
- Don Browne as Unfriendly Man #1
- Kendall MacDonnell as Unfriendly Man #2

== Reception ==
Review aggregator Rotten Tomatoes gives the film a rating of 0%, based on 0 reviews. Audiences give the film a 50% rating, based on 672 reviews, with an average rating of 3.1/5.
