= Columpa Bobb =

Canadian actress

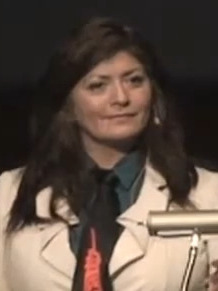
- Bobb in 2011
- Born: 1971 (age 54–55); Vancouver, British Columbia, Canada
- Occupations: Photographer, actress, playwright, poet, teacher
- Mother: Lee Maracle
- Relatives: Sid Bobb (brother); Chief Dan George (Great grandfather)

Columpa C. Bobb (born 1971) is a Canadian photographer, actress, playwright, poet and teacher.

== Career ==
Bobb, who is originally from Vancouver, has written over a dozen plays that have been produced across Canada and overseas including Jumping Mouse (co-written with Marion deVries), a play for young audiences, that was nominated for a Dora Mavor Moore Award and a James Buller Award. Bobb is most recognized for the role of Mary Cook on the CBC Television show North of 60, and also appeared in the short lived series The Rez and the film Johnny Greyeyes. In 1997, she won a Jessie Richardson Theatre Award for Outstanding Performance by an Actress in a Supporting Role for her work in Firehall Theatre's production of Drew Hayden Taylor's Only Drunks and Children Tell the Truth.

She was a cultural instructor and faculty member of the Centre for Indigenous Theatre in Toronto. She is currently the Program Director and instructor, teaching classes for the Aboriginal Arts Training & Mentorship Program at the Manitoba Theatre for Young People in Winnipeg, Manitoba, where she resides. The program serves about 325 students per year and is free of charge to all participants. Bobb is also an instructor for the Circus and Magic Partnership (CAMP) program through the Winnipeg International Children's Festival.

In 2019, Bobb appeared as Mavis in the National Arts Centre's production of Marie Clements' The Unnatural and Accidental Women.

Hope Matters (2019), a poetry book written by Columpa Bobb along with her mother Lee Maracle and her sister Tania Carter, explores the Indigenous experience from colonialism to reconciliation and reflects on the authors' own life experiences.

== Personal life ==
Bobb is the daughter of poet and writer Lee Maracle and the great-granddaughter of actor Chief Dan George.
