= Cheri Maracle =

Canadian actor and musician

- Born: 1972 (age 53–54); Six Nations of the Grand River, Ontario, Canada
- Occupation: Actress
- Years active: 1988–present

Cheri Maracle is a Canadian actress and musician of Mohawk-Irish descent.

== Early life ==
Maracle graduated in 1989 from Prince Rupert Secondary School. At seventeen, she moved to Vancouver to study theatre at Capilano University and the Spirit Song Native Indian Theatre School. She is a member of the Six Nations of the Grand River First Nation.

== Career ==
Maracle is best known for her roles in the television series Blackfly and Moccasin Flats, the 2007 film Tkaronto and stage productions of Tomson Highway's Ernestine Shuswap Gets Her Trout. She had a recurring role on Degrassi: Next Class as Ms. Cardinal, the mother of Grace Cardinal. She appeared in Marie Clements' 2017 musical documentary on Indigenous history, The Road Forward. In 2019, she played Verna in the National Arts Centre's production of Clements' The Unnatural and Accidental Women.

She has been nominated twice for the K.M. Hunter Theatre award for her theatrical work. She was also nominated for the Canadian Screen Awards in 2014 for her performance as Sarah Bull on the TV series Blackstone. From 2006 to 2008 she was an artistic associate of the Dora Mavor Moore Award-winning Aboriginal women's theatre company, Turtle Gals.

As a musician, she has performed as a backing vocalist for Jerry Alfred and the Medicine Beat, Tamara Podemski and Sandy Scofield, and as both a lead and supporting vocalist for Tiyoweh and The Showbiz Indians.

She performs with her quartet at various jazz and blues festivals across Canada. She also frequently performs original compositions and contemporary and classic jazz standards with her piano partner, Brendan Peltier. She has also performed in a one-woman musical, Paddle Song, about the life of Mohawk poet Pauline Johnson.
