= The Road Forward =

The Road Forward is a 2017 musical documentary film written and directed by Marie Clements about key moments in the history of Indigenous rights in Canada, from the 1930s to today. The film was produced by the National Film Board of Canada.

Clements has stated that the idea for the project came from browsing years of headlines in Native Voice, an Indigenous newspaper from British Columbia that she first heard of while doing research for the 2010 Cultural Olympics, during the Vancouver Olympics. Inspired by the headlines and stories, she began writing lyrics. She then worked with friends who were composers, to set music to her lyrics.

In the film, members of the Native Brotherhood and Native Sisterhood discuss the beginnings of their organizations, in 1931 and 1933 respectively, and how Native Voice had helped unite First Nations in British Columbia.

The Road Forward was initially presented as a musical theatre show in 2015, at Vancouver's Touchstone Theatre. The film features such Indigenous actors and musicians as Murray Porter, Michelle St. John, Cheri Maracle and Evan Adams, as well as songwriter Wayne Lavallee, actor and singer Cheri Maracle, hip-hop artist Ronnie Dean Harris, and Métis fiddler Jeremy James Lavallee.

== Release ==
The film premiered on April 30, 2017, at the Hot Docs Canadian International Documentary Festival in Toronto. It subsequently opened the DOXA Documentary Film Festival in Vancouver on May 4.
