= Prince Rupert Secondary School =

Coordinates: 54.3085°N 130.3176°W

Prince Rupert Secondary was a public high school in Prince Rupert, British Columbia. Prince Rupert Secondary was a part of School District 52 Prince Rupert.

== Transition To Middle School ==
On December 9, 2009, at a regularly scheduled Board meeting, the Board of Education of School District No. 52 (Prince Rupert) made a number of decisions which would lead to a new district configuration of schools effective September 2011.

This middle school is called Prince Rupert Middle School (PRMS) and all the older students who were attending Prince Rupert Secondary School at time of transition moved to Charles Hays Secondary School in September 2011.

== Alumni ==
- Bernice Liu, actress
- Cheri Maracle, actress and musician
- Ken Shields, Canadian basketball coach

== See also ==
- Royal eponyms in Canada
