= Byron Chief-Moon =

Canadian actor

Byron Chief-Moon is an Aboriginal Canadian actor, choreographer, dancer, playwright, and founder of the Coyote Arts Percussive Performance Association, a dance theatre company.

== Early life and education ==
Chief-Moon was born in Carlsbad, California, and is a member of the Kainai Nation of the Blackfoot Confederacy in southern Alberta.

== Career ==
Chief-Moon has made appearances in several well-known American and Canadian TV shows (such as MacGyver, North of 60, Stargate SG-1, Da Vinci's Inquest, Highlander: The Series, and appeared on Walker, Texas Ranger, as well as several feature films.

He appeared in Disney's White Fang 2: Myth of the White Wolf, a sequel to the White Fang.

Some of his dance theatre pieces have included Possessed, Dancing voices and Voices, as well as Jonesing, an experimental video dance piece. He is also known for his choreography work on the documentary Echoes of the Sisters and the dance film Quest. Chief-Moon plays the Quileute chief Taha Aki in The Twilight Saga: Eclipse.

== Personal life ==
Chief-Moon is a father of three children.

== Filmography ==
=== Film ===
Year	Title	Role	Notes
1994	Samurai Cowboy	Jack Eagle Eye	
1994	White Fang 2: Myth of the White Wolf	Matthew	
1994	Max	Bobby One Spot	
1995	Suspicious Agenda	Silverwing	
1995	Gunfighter's Moon	Julio	
1996	Alaska	Chip's Father	
1999	The Fear: Resurrection	Crow	
2000	Shadow Hours	Chatuga	
2003	Little Brother of War	Blaine	
2003	Scary Movie 3	Native American #2	
2009	X-Men Origins: Wolverine	Hunter #2	
2010	The Twilight Saga: Eclipse	Taha Aki	

=== Television ===
Year	Title	Role	Notes
1987, 1989	MacGyver	Sammy / Joe Whales	2 episodes
1990	Bordertown	White Feather	Episode: "White Feather"
1991	Max Glick	Telephone company worker	Episode: "Das Winnebago"
1993	Medicine River	Clyde Whiteman	Television film
1993–1995	North of 60	Louis Claybank	3 episodes
1994	Hawkeye	Swift Hand	Episode: "The Child"
1994	Tales of the Wild	Woonga	Episode: "Chasseurs de loups, chasseurs d'or"
1995	Children of the Dust	Chief Walks-The-Clouds	2 episodes
1995	The X-Files	Father	Episode: "Anasazi"
1995	Black Fox	Standing Bear	Television film
1995	Kidz in the Wood	Brandon Three Tongues	Television film
1995	The Commish	Clyde Smoke	Episode: "In the Shadows of the Gallows"
1996	Highlander: The Series	Jim Coltec	Episode: "Something Wicked"
1996–1999	Walker, Texas Ranger	Joseph Ironhorse / Red Bear	3 episodes
1997	Millennium	Felton	Episode: "A Single Blade of Grass"
1998	Stargate SG-1	Elder #2	Episode: "Spirits"
1998–1999	Da Vinci's Inquest	Goose Flowers	3 episodes
2001	Come l'America	Doug	Television film
2001	MythQuest	Chaczal	Episode: "Quetzalcoatl"
2004	Quest	Lead Dancer	Television film
2008	The Lost Treasure of the Grand Canyon	Aztec Priest	Television film
2010	Sanctuary	Spirit Being	2 episodes
2011–2013	Health Nutz	Chief Floyd Two-Rivers	10 episodes
