= Health Nutz =

Canadian sitcom

- Genre: Sitcom
- Created by: Jason Friesen
- Country of origin: Canada
- No. of seasons: 2
- No. of episodes: 12 (list of episodes)

Production
- Executive producers: Jason Friesen; Dasha D. Novak
- Production locations: North Vancouver, British Columbia, Canada
- Running time: 30 minutes

Original release
- Network: APTN
- Release: March 22, 2011 – February 11, 2013

Health Nutz is a Canadian television situation comedy series created by Jason Friesen, who is also the writer and executive producer. The series was produced by Jason Friesen and Dasha D. Novak and aired on APTN. The pilot episode was shown on APTN on December 27, 2010. The series ran for two seasons, starting on March 22, 2011 and on January 11, 2013.

== Setting ==
Buzz Riel Jr., a former professional hockey player who since a career-ending accident has become an alcoholic gambler, inherits the Health Nutz juice bar in North Vancouver and an associated lucrative energy drink patent from his estranged father on condition that he gets and stays sober. The pilot was filmed at a run-down pub on Hastings Street and used exteriors at Orange Number 5, a strip joint.

== Cast ==
- Kevin Loring – Buzz Riel Jr.
- Lucie Guest
- Ali Liebert
- Chris Gauthier
- Chad Krowchuk
- Byron Chief-Moon – Chief Floyd Two-Rivers, Buzz Sr.'s right-hand man and executor, and a former alcoholic
- David Hamilton Lyle
- Cyler Point
- Sam Bob
- Jim Shield
- Ken Lawson – homeless man who plays the ukulele
- Laura Mennell
- Brian George
- Lexa Doig - Ivonka
