= National Arts Centre =

Performing arts organization in Ontario, Canada

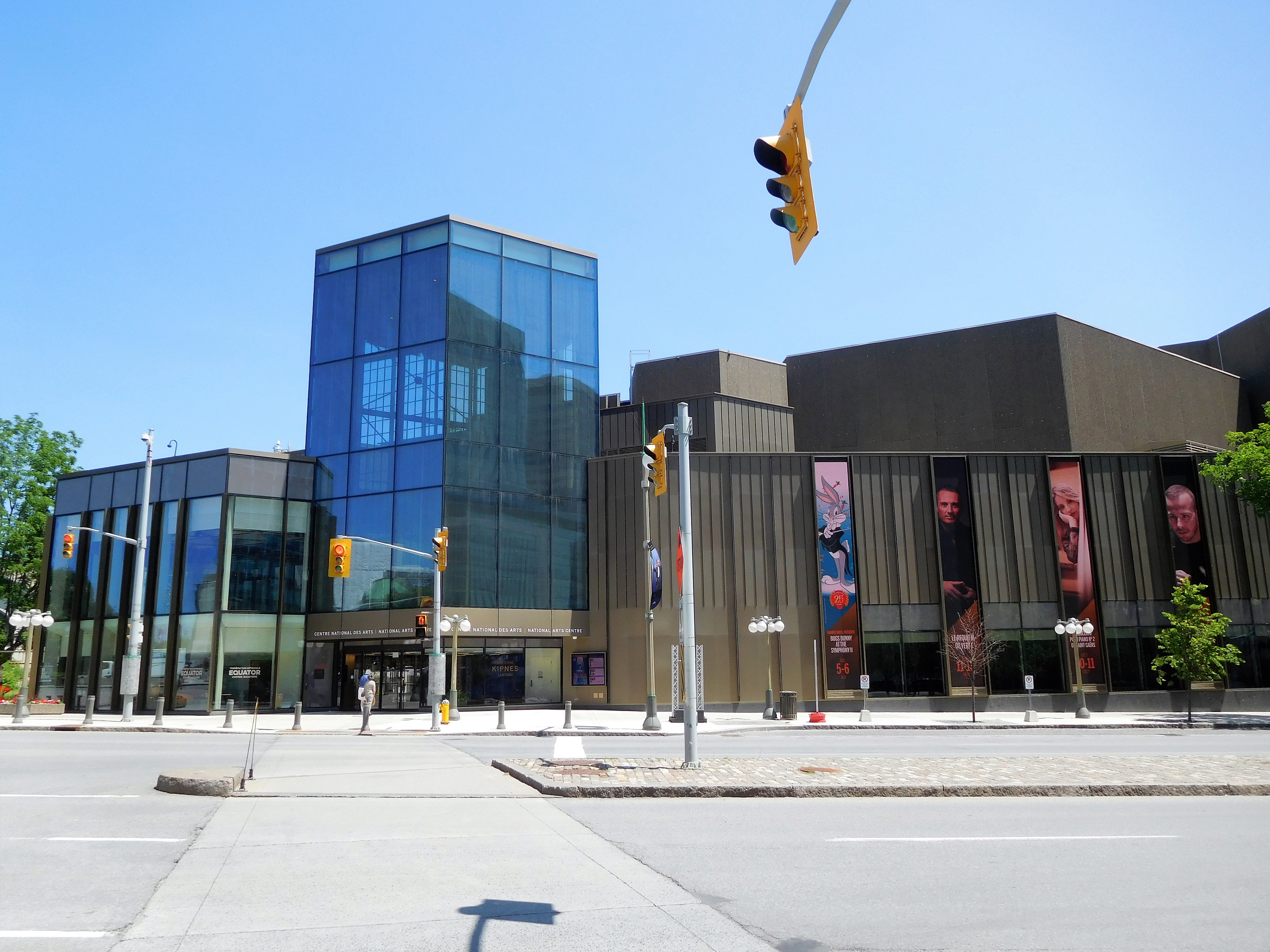
- Address: 1 Elgin Street; Ottawa, Ontario; Canada

Website
- nac-cna.ca

The National Arts Centre (NAC) (French: Centre national des Arts) is a performing arts organization in Ottawa, Ontario, along the Rideau Canal. It is based in the eponymous National Arts Centre building.

== History ==
The NAC was one of several projects launched by the government of Lester B. Pearson to commemorate Canada's 1967 centenary. In 1962, G. Hamilton Southam, scion to the Southam publishing business which owned the Ottawa Citizen, was approached by residents of the city to spearhead the creation of a performing arts facility in Ottawa. After he took the project to the Pearson government the following year, construction was officially approved. Officially proclaimed in 1966, its board of directors received a mandate to "to operate and maintain the Centre, to develop the performing arts in the National Capital region, and to assist the Canada Council in the development of the performing arts elsewhere in Canada". It opened its doors to the public for the first time on May 31, 1969, at a cost of C$46 million. The opening was presided over by then-Prime Minister Pierre Elliott Trudeau.

In February 2014, the centre unveiled a new logo and slogan, Canada is our stage, in preparation for its fiftieth anniversary in 2019. The former logo had been designed by Montreal graphic designer Ernst Roch and had been in use since the centre's opening.

In October 2015, initial talks about plans to develop an Indigenous theatre were held between NAC leadership, Indigenous performers and community leaders from across Canada with the aim of making Indigenous theatre a core activity of the National Arts Centre. In June 2017, Kevin Loring was hired to be the first artistic director of the NAC Indigenous Theatre department. Lori Marchand was appointed the first managing director of the department soon after. Along with Lindsay Lachance, an artistic associate, the Indigenous Theatre department works to increase the representation of Indigenous peoples through theatre and provide further space and resources for Indigenous actors and playwrights to thrive. To date, over $1 million has been raised to establish the Indigenous Theatre department through a tribute dinner hosted by the NAC in June 2018. The first full season of the Indigenous theatre department commenced in the fall of 2019.

== Departments ==
=== Orchestra ===
The National Arts Centre Orchestra is a world-class ensemble of outstanding classical musicians from across Canada and around the world, led by music director, Alexander Shelley. Since its debut in 1969 at the opening of Canada's National Arts Centre, the orchestra has been praised for the passion and clarity of its performances, its groundbreaking educational programs, and its leadership in nurturing Canadian creativity.

=== Indigenous Theatre ===
Kevin Loring is the current director of the Indigenous Theatre. Loring is Nlaka'pamux from Lytton, British Columbia, a small town in the Fraser Canyon and was born November 24, 1974. His first published play, Where The Blood Mixes, won the Governor General's Award for English-language drama in 2009. He is also the artistic director of The Savage Society. When asked what Indigenous theatre is, he says that it is "Our stories told and performed through the lens of Indigenous people".

The Indigenous Theatre's first production, co-presented by the NAC English Theatre, was in September 2019 when Muriel Miguel directed Marie Clements' The Unnatural and Accidental Women. The production starred PJ Prudat as Rebecca and Monique Mojica as Aunt Shadie and also featured Yolanda Bonnell, Columpa C. Bobb, and Cheri Maracle.

Notable figures in the Indigenous theatre department include:

- Kevin Loring: playwright, actor and teacher, winner of the Governor General's Award for English-language drama for his play, Where the Blood Mixes in 2009
- Lori Marchand: former director of Western Canada Theatre and daughter of Leonard Marchand, the first Indigenous Member of Parliament in Canada
- Lindsay Lachance: PhD candidate and sessional lecturer in theatre at the University of British Columbia and Simon Fraser University

== Artistic aims and performances ==
One of Canada's most extensive performing arts facilities, the National Arts Centre displays ballets, orchestras, theatre and musical performances. At 107,600 m^{2} (1,158,000 ft^{2}), the NAC works with thousands of artists, both emerging and established, from across Canada and around the world and collaborates with dozens of other arts organizations across the country. The NAC operates in the performing arts fields of classical music, English theatre, French theatre, Indigenous theatre, dance, variety, and community programming. The NAC supports programs for young and emerging artists and programs for young audiences and produces resources and study materials for teachers. The NAC is the only multidisciplinary, multilingual performing arts centre in North America and one of the largest in the world.

The National Arts Centre is home to the National Arts Centre Orchestra, considered one of the world's leading classical-size orchestras. Alexander Shelley, a conductor, pianist, cellist and teacher, has been the orchestra's music director since 2015.

Jean Roberts was the artistic director of the English theatre (1975–1977), followed by John Wood (1977–1984). Andis Celms was a theatre producer (1984–1997), and Marti Maraden served as artistic director of English theatre from 1997 to 2005.

Peter Hinton-Davis succeeded Marti Maraden as artistic director of English Theatre at the National Arts Centre (NAC) in November 2005, bringing a vision that reinvigorated the NAC's English Theatre. During his tenure, Hinton reintroduced a resident acting company and programmed the company's first season of all-Canadian plays. A champion of diverse and Indigenous voices, Hinton was instrumental in staging works by notable playwrights such as Marie Clements, Yvette Nolan, Kevin Loring, and Daniel David Moses. In 2008, Hinton produced and developed the co-production of Margaret Atwood's The Penelopiad between the NAC and the Royal Shakespeare Company, a collaboration that showcased Canadian theatrical talent on an international stage and strengthened ties between major cultural institutions. In his final season, he directed the NAC's all-Aboriginal production of King Lear, starring August Schellenberg. Hinton was succeeded by Jillian Keiley in 2012.

The current artistic director of English Theatre is Nina Lee Aquino; the artistic director of French Theatre is Mani Soleymanlou (who succeeded Brigitte Haentjens in 2021); Caroline Ohrt is the executive producer of dance (succeeding Cathy Levy in 2023); Heather Moore is producer and executive director of the Scene Festivals; Heather Gibson is producer of NAC Presents. The National Arts Centre produces nine podcasts in both official languages. They cover French and English theatre and classical and contemporary Canadian music. The NAC has since created an Indigenous Theatre discipline. On June 15, 2017, Kevin Loring was announced as the first artistic director of Indigenous Theatre.

Kurt Waldele was executive chef for two decades until his death in 2009. His successor Michael Blackie, was responsible for creating "Celebrity Chefs of Canada," which ran in both 2011 and 2012. In late 2012, Michael left the NAC to develop his own business in Ottawa, located on the city's west end and called NeXT. In 2013, John Morris was promoted to the position of executive chef. John Morris worked under chefs David Garcelon, Michael Blackie and Steven Gugelmeier. Kenton Leier was appointed as Executive Chef, effective July 26, 2017.

The National Arts Centre is a co-producer of the Canada Dance Festival and co-founder of the Magnetic North Theatre Festival, which operates in partnership with the Canadian Theatre Festival Society. The Magnetic North Theatre Festival is an annual event first held in Ottawa in 2003 and is held every in other Canadian cities in alternating years. The festival offers not only productions and performances for the theatre-going public, but offers workshops and seminars aimed at theatre students and professionals.

In 2021, during the COVID-19 pandemic in Canada, the NAC created the series Undisrupted for CBC Gem, which featured four Canadian performers or composers of classical or opera music creating a short film set to a new original composition. One of these digital productions was a co-production between Article 11 and Downstage Performance Society of Tara Beagan's play Deer Woman, about a Blackfoot woman in a forest clearing preparing to enact violent revenge on a white man who has killed her sister as well as other Native women. This play was a provocative piece of theatre responding to the play Pig Girl by Colleen Murphy, which focuses on the murder of an Indigenous woman by a serial killer modeled on Robert Pickton.
