= Hot Peaches =

Drag theatre company in New York City

Hot Peaches was a gay political theatre company in New York City that would put on plays, active from the 1970s-1990s. Hot Peaches was founded by Jimmy Camicia in 1972, who encountered a group of drag queens and began writing work for them to perform. Their work has been described as "political camp, dominated by drag".

== Notable members ==
- Marsha P. Johnson, a prominent gay liberation activist throughout the late 20th century, performed with the troupe starting in 1972 through to the early 90s.
- Peggy Shaw performed with the troupe through the first half of the 1970s as one of only three women at the time. She took on a prestigious role in the drag theater sphere after Hot Peaches crossed paths with the Spiderwomen during their 1978 tour stop in Berlin. This encounter was formative for both the troupe and herself, as she went on to become a part of Spiderwomen, and then co-founded Split Britches in 1981 with Spiderwomen member Lois Weaver.
- Bette Bourne was only a member for a year after experiencing his first Hot Peaches performance, The Heat, in 1974, though his time with the troupe influenced his creation of a similar, London-based group, Bloolips.
- Ned Asta, a member of the Lavender Hill commune in Ithaca, New York, and illustrator of gay novelist Larry Mitchell's cult classic, The Faggots and Their Friends Between Revolutions, toured with Hot Peaches during the late 1970s.“Whodunit” by Ian McKay, a member of the Hot Peaches troupe.

== Troupe culture ==
While the group's main objective was performance, Hot Peaches' primary function was to provide a nurturing queer community, and a platform for members self-expression. Camicia has been quoted as saying "We're not actors, we're entertainers. Rather than becoming the script, the script becomes us." The impact of the community on its members also included interactions with fellow drag performance groups and queer revolutionaries. Jimmy Camicia and Peggy Shaw were influenced by a conversation on feminism with Mallory Jones, sister of Kate Millett, and thus instituted feminist messages into their performances.

The early work of the company often created their performances around the fashion and outfits its performers wanted to wear. These outfits were often ostentatious, sparkling glam outfits, which included platform boots, glitter, tinsel and feather boas. The vibrancy of the troupe's costumes became a defining moment during their European tour stop in Berlin in 1978, when they lent their wardrobe to the Spiderwoman Theater, whose luggage had been lost during travel. The two groups had conflicting styles. According to Lois Weaver, the Spiderwomen were a feminist troupe devoted to "deconstructing the feminist image," while Hot Peaches' wardrobe consisted of "excessive femininity".

== See also ==
- List of drag groups
