= Lee Maracle =

Indigenous Canadian writer and academic (1950–2021)

Lee Maracle OC
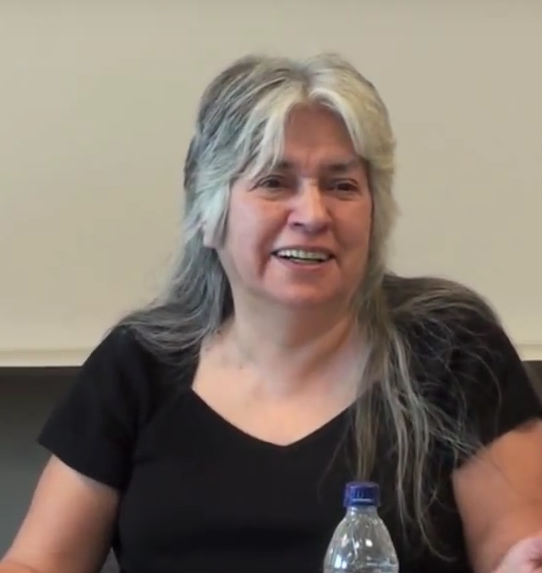
- Maracle in 2009
- Born: Marguerite Aline Carter; July 2, 1950; North Vancouver, British Columbia, Canada
- Died: November 11, 2021 (aged 71); Surrey, British Columbia, Canada
- Spouse(s): Raymond Bobb; Aiyyana Maracle
- Children: 3, including Columpa Bobb and Sid Bobb
- Relatives: Chief Dan George (grandfather); Joan Phillip (sister)

Bobbi Lee Maracle (born Marguerite Aline Carter; July 2, 1950 – November 11, 2021) was an Indigenous Canadian writer and academic of the Stó꞉lō nation. Born in North Vancouver, British Columbia, she left formal education after grade 8 to travel across North America, attending Simon Fraser University on her return to Canada. Her first book, an autobiography called Bobbi Lee: Indian Rebel, was published in 1975. She wrote fiction, non-fiction, and criticism and held various academic positions. Maracle's work focused on the lives of Indigenous people, particularly women, in contemporary North America. As a writer and speaker, Maracle fought for those oppressed by sexism, racism, and capitalist exploitation.

== Early life and education ==
The granddaughter of Tsleil-Waututh Chief Dan George, she was born Marguerite Aline Carter on July 2, 1950, in North Vancouver, British Columbia. "Lee" was a nickname for "Aline". She grew up in North Vancouver, raised mainly by her mother, Jean (Croutze) Carter.

Maracle dropped out of school after grade 8 and went from California, where she did various jobs including producing films and doing stand-up comedy, to Toronto. She then attended Simon Fraser University. In the 1970s, she became involved with the Red Power movement in Vancouver.

== Writing ==
Maracle's writing explores the experience of Indigenous women, critiquing patriarchy and white supremacy. Her first book was an autobiography: Bobbi Lee: Indian Rebel, published in 1975. The book began as an assignment in a course about writing life histories. Critic Hartmut Lutz describes Indian Rebel as "a celebration of Native survival", comparing it to the works of Maria Campbell and Howard Adams. Indian Rebel was "one of the first Indigenous works published in Canada".

I Am Woman (1988) applies feminist theory to the situation of Indigenous women, describing women's sexual victimization at the hands of Indigenous and white men alike while reflecting on her own struggle for liberation. Sojourner's Truth (1990), a collection of short stories, describes the everyday lives of Indigenous people dealing with a "Eurocentric culture". Her poetry book, Hope Matters, was written in conjunction with her daughters Columpa Bobb and Tania Carter, and was published in 2019.

Sundogs (1992), Maracle's first novel, touches on remembering Indigenous heritage and recollecting cultural roots.

Ravensong (1993) speaks of blending oral tradition and holistic oneness with tackling the barriers of racism, sexism, and class.

== Academic positions ==
Maracle was one of the founders of the En'owkin International School of Writing in Penticton, British Columbia. She was the cultural director of the Centre for Indigenous Theatre in Toronto, Ontario, from 1998 to 2000.

Maracle taught at the University of Toronto, the University of Waterloo, and Southern Oregon University, and was a professor of Canadian culture at Western Washington University. She lived in Toronto, teaching at the University of Toronto First Nations House. She was the writer-in-residence at the University of Guelph.

== Personal life ==
Maracle belonged to the Stó꞉lō nation and had Coast Salish and Cree ancestry. She has been described as Métis. She was married to Raymond Bobb and later to Aiyyana Maracle. She and Bobb had two daughters, including Columpa Bobb, and one son, actor Sid Bobb.

She died on November 11, 2021, at Surrey Memorial Hospital in Surrey, British Columbia.

== Awards and honours ==
In 2017, Maracle was presented with the Bonham Centre Award from the Mark S. Bonham Centre for Sexual Diversity Studies, University of Toronto, for her contributions to the advancement and education of issues around sexual identification.

Maracle was named an officer of the Order of Canada in 2018.

In 2020, she was named a finalist for the Neustadt International Prize for Literature for Celia's Song.

She delivered the 2021 Writers' Trust of Canada Margaret Laurence Lecture on "A Writing Life".

== Publications ==
=== Fiction ===
- Sojourner's Truth and Other Stories (Press Gang Publishers, 1990)
- Sundogs (Theytus Books, 1992)
- Ravensong (Press Gang Publishers, 1993)
- Daughters Are Forever (Raincoast Books, 2002)
- Will's Garden (Theytus Books, 2002)
- First Wives Club: Coast Salish Style (Theytus Books, 2010)
- Celia's Song (Cormorant Books, 2014)

=== Non-fiction ===
- Bobbi Lee: Indian Rebel (Liberation Support Movement, 1975; reissued by Women's Press Literary, 1990)
- I Am Woman: A Native Perspective on Sociology and Feminism (Write-On Press, 1988; reissued by Press Gang Publishers, 1996)
- Oratory: Coming to Theory (Gallerie Publications, 1990)
- Memory Serves: Oratories (NeWest Press, 2015)
- My Conversations with Canadians (BookThug, 2017)

=== Poetry ===
- Bent Box (Theytus Books, 2000)
- Talking to the Diaspora (Arbeiter Ring Publishing, 2015)
- Hope Matters (with Columpa Bobb and Tania Carter) (Book*hug, 2019)

=== Edited anthologies ===
- Telling It: Women and Language Across Cultures (with Betsy Warland, Sky Lee, and Daphne Marlatt) (Press Gang Publishers, 1990)
- We Get Our Living Like Milk from the Land (with Jeannette Armstrong, Delphine Derickson, and Greg Younging) (Theytus Books, 1993)
- My Home as I Remember (with Sandra Laronde) (Natural Heritage Books, 2000)

== See also ==
- List of University of Waterloo people
