= Native American Women Playwrights Archive =

The Native American Women Playwrights Archive (NAWPA) is a collection of manuscripts and related items pertaining to Native American women in theater. It was established in 1997 at Miami University in Oxford, Ohio and is located in the university's King Library. The archive is a repository for Spiderwoman Theater and contains promotional and personal documents associated with the theater troupe and its members.

== History ==
NAWPA began in 1996 with Dr. William Wortman, humanities librarian, and John Allen Johnson, a Cherokee and African American graduate student researching Native American women playwrights at Miami University. Johnson had difficulty finding material to research, so the two built the archive by approaching writers and performers to add to the collection.

== Holdings ==
The Native American Women Playwrights Archive in the King Library's Walter Havighurst Special Collections of Miami University contains play manuscripts and other materials including audio and video recordings of performances (VHS tapes, audio cassettes, CDs, and DVDs), photographs, newspaper articles, reviews, flyers, and posters. The archive also holds administrative and financial documents, notes, forms, mailings lists, and correspondence pertaining to the management of the archive and sponsored conferences and events.

Other holdings include documents relating to the work of Spiderwoman Theater, such as photographs of performances, play programs, interviews, and personal accounts from the members of the theater troupe. There are also documents regarding the legal dispute with Marvel Comics over the name "Spiderwoman."

All the materials in NAWPA are open-access and available for anyone to read in the library. NAWPA continuously adds new playwrights and works to its collection. The archive encourages "playwrights at any level of development" to submit their materials.

== Publications ==
In 2008, University of Michigan Press published Footpaths and Bridges: Voices from the Native American Women Playwrights Archive, edited by Shirley A. Huston-Findley and Rebecca Howard. The anthology includes a number of scripts from NAWPA and critical commentary on the recurring themes in the plays. Other related publications include:

- Performing Worlds into Being: Native American Women's Theater, edited by Ann Elizabeth Armstrong, Kelli Lyon Johnson, and William A. Wortman (2009)
- Repairing the Web: Spiderwoman's Children Staging the New Human Being by Jill L. Carter (2010)
- Seventh Generation: An Anthology of Native American Plays, edited by Mimi Gisofi D'Aponte (1999)
- Staging Coyote's Dream: An Anthology of First Nations Drama in English V.1 & 2, edited by Monique and Ric Knowles (2003)

== See also ==
- Spiderwoman Theater
- Native American dramatists and playwrights
- Indigenous theatre
