= Aiyyana Maracle =

Indigenous performance artist

- Born: November 25, 1950; Six Nations, Ontario, Canada
- Died: April 24, 2016
- Education: Goddard College (MFA)
- Known for: Performance art, installation art, theatre director, curator, scholar
- Spouse: Lee Maracle
- Awards: Canada Council John Hirsch Prize, 1997

Aiyyana Maracle (25 November 1950 – 24 April 2016) was a Haudenosaunee performance artist, activist, theatre director, scholar, and educator. She is known for her contributions to the Indigenous performance art community. In 1997, she was the first Indigenous recipient of Canada Council's esteemed John Hirsch Prize for emerging theatre directors.

== Life ==
Maracle was born on November 25, 1950, in Six Nations, a First Nations reserve situated on the Grand River in Southern Ontario. She spent the first seven years of her life living with her grandmother and five siblings. Her parents, Leonard and Cordelia (Kitty) Maracle, were active in several Indigenous organizations in Canada. When her father was denied official status under the Indian Act, her family was forced to leave Six Nations and assimilate into urban society. They moved frequently over the next ten years and lived in cities such as Rochester and Buffalo, New York.

Maracle was assigned male at birth and began her gender transformation journey at age 40. During her transformation, she rejected the rigid binary model of gender, embracing a fluid gender expression. In her essay, "A Journey in Gender", she referred to herself as a "transformed woman who loves women" and argued that the European concepts of transsexuality and binary gender did not align with most Indigenous cultures.

In 2010, she moved back to Six Nations with one of her sons and became an outspoken advocate for transgender and gender nonconforming youth. In 2012, she co-founded Gender Journey, a peer support group out of Grand River Community Health Centre in Brantford, Ontario.

== Education and teaching ==
Maracle completed one year of a Bachelor of Architecture (BArch) at Pennsylvania State University in 1969. She completed university transfer courses (including physics, chemistry, math, English and Spanish) in 1984 at Vancouver Community College, Langara campus. In 2006, she received a Master of Fine Arts (MFA) (with a specialization in interdisciplinary media) from Goddard College in Plainfield, Vermont.

Between 2002 and 2007, she taught at various Canadian universities. She gave guest lectures at Emily Carr University of Art and Design in Vancouver and taught Native Literature at Concordia University in Montreal. In 2006, she accepted an unpaid visiting scholar position at McGill University.

== Career ==
Maracle was best known for her performance and installation art pieces including Gender Möbius (1995) and Death in the Shadow of the Umbrella (2015). Throughout her artistic career, she explored various other mediums such as painting, drawing, printmaking, photography, and collage. She also handmade numerous garments and accessories such as fur headpieces, masks, dresses, robes, skirts, jackets, jewelry, and metal nipples to wear during performances.

Maracle's performance art was drawn from Indigenous culture and combined traditional Ogwehoweh art with aspects of European theatre. She was part of a contemporary Indigenous art community in Vancouver in the 1990s where she was involved with an artist-run centre known as Grunt gallery. She curated performances such as the Halfbred (1995) and First Nations Performance Series (1992) which explored Indigenous identity as it intersected with themes of race, gender, and sexuality. She performed in NDN Wars Are Alive, and ... Well? and Death Under the Shadow of the Umbrella.

Maracle was also known for her writing, most notably her essay titled "A Journey in Gender" and her 2000 book, Chronicle of a Transformed Woman in which she described the traditional Indigenous medicine rituals she used throughout her gender transformation journey.

== Honors and awards ==
In 1997, Maracle received Canada Council's John Hirsch Prize for being the "most artistically exciting new director in the country." In 2003, she received an award from the National Aboriginal Achievement Foundation (now known as Indspire).

== Selected bibliography ==
- Maracle, Aiyyana. "A Journey in Gender." Torquere: Journal of the Canadian Lesbian and Gay Studies Association 2, no. 1 (2000): 36-57. A Journey in Gender.
- Maracle, Aiyyana. Interview on Tranzister Radio 29, CKUT 90.3 FM. October 9, 2014.
- Maracle, Aiyyana. "Performance Art and the Native Artist: an rEvolutionary Mix?" Disgruntled: Other Art. Vancouver: Grunt Gallery, 2015.
- Maracle, Aiyyana. "Perils of Pauline opera." The Vancouver Sun, December 18, 1999.
