= Hiromi Go =

Japanese singer and actor (born 1955)

- Born: Hiromi Haratake; October 18, 1955 (age 70); Sue, Kasuya, Fukuoka Prefecture
- Origin: Japan
- Genres: Pop, kayōkyoku, R&B
- Occupations: Singer, actor
- Years active: 1971–present
- Label: Sony Music Entertainment Japan
- Website: hiromi-go.net

YouTube information
- Channel: 郷ひろみ / Hiromi Go Official YouTube Channel
- Years active: 2021 -
- Subscribers: 68.8 thousand
- Views: 40.5 million
- Last updated: 4 August 2026

Hiromi Go (郷 ひろみ, Gō Hiromi; born October 18, 1955), is a Japanese singer, part of Sony Music Entertainment Japan. His real name is Hiromi Haratake (原武 裕美, Haratake Hiromi).

In the 1970s, he was called the "New Big Three" (新御三家, shin gosanke) with Goro Noguchi and Hideki Saijo. He belonged to Johnny & Associates, but three years after debut in 1975, left the agency. He also effectively became the Japanese answer to Ricky Martin after his 1999 Japanese version of "Livin' la Vida Loca," which was called "Goldfinger '99". His stage name's initials are "HG", and that, combined with his remake of Ricky Martin's "Livin la Vida Loca" made him a direct and frequent target of comedian Hard Gay.

Go featured Japanese hip hop musician Dohzi-T in his R&B-style song "Kimi Dake o," released on May 14, 2008. "Kimi Dake o" was included in his album Place to Be, and the remix of the song was included as a bonus track in Dohzi-T's album 12 Love Stories.

Go appeared in the Canadian film Samurai Cowboy with Catherine Mary Stewart and Robert Conrad, which was released in 1993. He was also invited to the Japanese touring ice show Fantasy on Ice in 2014, where he performed live with figure skater and two-time Olympic champion, Yuzuru Hanyu, to the song "Ienai yo" (lit. "I can't say it") amongst others.

== Discography ==
=== Singles ===
Year	Album	Chart positions (JP)	Label
1972	"Otoko no Ko Onna no Ko" (男の子女の子)	8	CBS Sony
1972	"Chiisana Taiken" (小さな体験)	4	CBS Sony
1972	"Tenshi no Uta" (天使の詩)	17	CBS Sony
1973	"Ai e no Start" (愛への出発)	2	CBS Sony
1973	"Hadaka no Venus" (裸のビーナス)	2	CBS Sony
1973	"Miryoku no March" (魅力のマーチ)	2	CBS Sony
1973	"Mona Lisa no Himitsu" (モナリザの秘密)	2	CBS Sony
1974	"Hana to Mitsubachi" (花とみつばち)	3	CBS Sony
1974	"Kimi wa Tokubetsu" (君は特別)	6	CBS Sony
1974	"Yoroshiku Aishuu" (よろしく哀愁)	1	CBS Sony
1974	"Warui Yuuwaku" (わるい誘惑)	5	CBS Sony
1975	"Hana no You ni Tori no You ni" (花のように 鳥のように)	2	CBS Sony
1975	"Sasowarete Flamenco" (誘われてフラメンコ)	2	CBS Sony
1975	"Aeru Kamo Shirenai" (逢えるかもしれない)	4	CBS Sony
1975	"Bye Bye Baby" (逢えるかもしれない)	9	CBS Sony
1976	"Koi no Yowami" (恋の弱味)	4	CBS Sony
1976	"20 Sai no Binetsu" (20才の微熱)	3	CBS Sony
1976	"Anata ga Itakara Boku ga Ita" (あなたがいたから僕がいた)	2	CBS Sony
1976	"Samui Yoake" (寒い夜明け)	5	CBS Sony
1977	"Mayonaka no Hero" (真夜中のヒーロー)	5	CBS Sony
1977	"Kanashiki Memory" (悲しきメモリー)	5	CBS Sony
1977	"Kouzui no Mae" (洪水の前)	5	CBS Sony
1977	"Kikyou/Obake no Rock" (帰郷/お化けのロック)	2	CBS Sony
1977	"Kinryouku" (禁猟区)	8	CBS Sony
1978	"Vibration" (バイブレーション)	6	CBS Sony
1978	"Boku no Rusuban" (ぼくのるすばん)	51	CBS Sony
1978	"Ringo Satsujin Jiken" (林檎殺人事件)	6	CBS Sony
1978	"Hollywood Scandal" (ハリウッド・スキャンダル)	13	CBS Sony
1978	"Chijou no Koibito" (地上の恋人)	17	CBS Sony
1979	"Naiyo Naiyo Night" (ナイヨ・ナイヨ・ナイト)	24	CBS Sony
1979	"Itsumo Kokoro ni Taiyou wo" (いつも心に太陽を)	12	CBS Sony
1979	"My Lady" (マイ レディー)	8	CBS Sony
1980	"Sexy You (Monroe Walk)" (セクシー・ユー（モンロー・ウォーク）)	11	CBS Sony
1980	"Taboo (Kinjirareta Ai)" (タブー（禁じられた愛）)	8	CBS Sony
1980	"How Many ii Kao" (How many いい顔)	8	CBS Sony
1980	"Wakasa no Catharsis" (若さのカタルシス)	15	CBS Sony
1981	"Mikansei" (未完成)	13	CBS Sony
1981	"Oyome Samba" (お嫁サンバ)	6	CBS Sony
1981	"Mou Ichido Shishunki" (もういちど思春期)	12	CBS Sony
1981	"Aishuu Hero Part1 / Part2" (哀愁ヒーロー Part1・Part2)	16	CBS Sony
1982	"Junjou" (純情)	17	CBS Sony
1982	"Onna Deare, Otoko Deare" (女であれ、男であれ)	19	CBS Sony
1982	"Aishuu no Casablanca" (哀愁のカサブランカ)	2	CBS Sony
1982	"Kanashimi no Kuroi Hitomi" (哀しみの黒い瞳)	10	CBS Sony
1983	"Bibou no Miyako" (美貌の都)	18	CBS Sony
1983	"Romance" (ロマンス)	20	CBS Sony
1983	"Suteki ni Cinderella Complex" (素敵にシンデレラ・コンプレックス)	9	CBS Sony
1983	"Hottoitekure" (ほっといてくれ)	22	CBS Sony
1983	"Chatelet Amona Hotel" (シャトレ・アモーナ・ホテル)	25	CBS Sony
1984	"2 Oku 4 Sen Man no Hitomi" (2億4千万の瞳-エキゾチック・ジャパン-)	7	CBS Sony
1984	"Yakushini" (ヤクシニー)	21	CBS Sony
1984	"Doko Made Aventure / Careless Whisper" (どこまでアバンチュール/ケアレス・ウィスパー)	20	CBS Sony
1985	"Ai no Empty Page" (愛のエンプティーペイジ)	34	CBS Sony
1985	"Charisma"	-	CBS Sony
1985	"Sapphire Blue" (サファイア・ブルー)	42	CBS Sony
1985	"Cool/Labyrinth"	-	CBS Sony
1987	"Sennen no Kodoku" (千年の孤独)	68	CBS Sony
1988	"Sennen no Kodoku" (時をかさねたら)	-	CBS Sony
1989	"Saishuu Bin ni Maniaeba" (最終便にまにあえば)	-	CBS Sony
1990	"W Booking -La Chica De Cuba-" (Wブッキング)	82	CBS Sony
1990	"Mou Daremo Aisanai" (もう誰も愛さない)	-	CBS Sony
1991	"Hadaka no Venus / Yoroshiku Aishuu" (裸のビーナス/よろしく哀愁)	-	Sony
1991	"Mayoism" (迷イズム)	-	Sony
1992	"Venustachi no Siesta" (ビーナスたちのシエスタ)	-	Sony
1993	"Boku ga Donna ni Kimi wo Suki ka, Kimi wa Shiranai" (僕がどんなに君を好きか、君は知らない)	43	Sony
1994	"Ienai yo" (言えないよ)	27	Sony
1995	"Aitakute Shikatanai / Wasurarenai Hito" (逢いたくてしかたない)	17	Sony
1995	"Nakeba ii" (泣けばいい)	29	Sony
1996	"Donna ni Kimi ga Hanarete Itatte / Hadaka no Yume" (どんなに君がはなれていたって)	20	Sony
1996	"Ku.Se.Ni.Na.Ru / Amai Sokubaku" (く・せ・に・な・る)	26	Sony
1996	"Don't leave you alone / Itsumo Soba ni Kimi ga Ita" (Don't leave you alone/いつもそばに君がいた)	29	Sony
1997	"Zero ni Nare" (Zeroになれ)	84	Sony
1997	"Yukkuri Koi Shiyou" (ゆっくり恋しよう)	30	Sony
1998	"Kiss ga Kanashii" (KISSが哀しい)	42	Sony
1999	"Otoko ga Koi ni Deau Toki" (男が恋に出逢うとき)	78	Sony
1999	"Goldfinger '99"	13	Sony
2000	"Hallelujah, Burning Love"	20	Sony
2001	"Only for you: Kono Eien ga Aru Kagiri" (Only for you〜この永遠がある限り〜)	34	Sony
2001	"Kemono wa Hada ni Naritagaru" (獣は裸になりたがる)	27	Sony
2001	"Waki Waki my Friend" (ワキワキマイフレンド)	43	Sony
2001	"Kono Sekai no Dokoka ni" (この世界のどこかに)	29	Sony
2005	"Ai Yori Hayaku" (愛より速く)	19	Sony Music
2005	"Kimi ga Nakeru Basho ni Naru" (君が泣ける場所になる)	18	Sony Music
2006	"Life"	34	Sony Music
2007	"Boom Boom Boom/Come On Baby"	12	Sony Music
2007	"Good Times Bad Times"	26	Sony Music
2008	"Kimi Dake wo feat. Dohzi-T" (君だけを)	19	Sony Music
2008	"Ari no Mama de Soba ni Ite" (ありのままでそばにいて)	62	Sony Music
2009	"Dangan Groove!" (男願 Groove!)	15	Sony Music
2009	"Get Real Love: GOLDFINGER'009"	15	Sony Music
2010	"Bokura no Hero" (僕らのヒーロー)	29	Sony Music
2010	"Aishiteru / Aishitewa Ikenai Hito" (愛してる/愛してはいけないひと)	13	Sony Music
2011	"Egao ni Kanpai!" (笑顔にカンパイ!)	16	Sony Music
2012	"Dangerer" (デンジャラー☆)	21	Sony Music
2013	"Bang Bang"	28	Sony Music
2014	"99 wa Owaranai" (99は終わらない)	23	Sony Music
2015	"100 no Negai" (100の願い)	12	Sony Music
2016	"Irregular"	21	Sony Music
2017	"Suki Dakara" (スキだから)	17	Sony Music
2018	"Koi wa Shumishumi" (恋はシュミシュミ)	12	Sony Music
2019	"Jan Jan Japanese"	16	Sony Music
2020	"Want You" (ウォンチュー!!!)	7	Sony Music
2021	"100 Kai no Kakushin-Han / Kitsunebi" (100GO!回の確信犯/狐火)	14	Sony Music
2022	"Jan Ken Pon GO" (ジャンケンポンGO!!)	13	Sony Music
2023	"Ore wa Saikou" (俺は最高!!!)	16	Sony Music
2024	"Dekiru Dake" (できるだけ)	12	Sony Music

==== Collaboration singles ====
Year	Album	Chart positions (JP)	Label
2000	"Nakatta Koto ni Shite" (忘れていいの-愛の幕切れ-): with Hyper Go Go	8	Sony
2000	"True Love Story / Sayonara no Kiss wo Wasurenai" (True Love Story/さよならのKISSを忘れない): with Seiko Matsuda	7	Sony

=== Albums ===
==== Studio albums ====
Title	Album details	Peak chart positions
Title	Album details	JPN Oricon
Otoko no Ko Onna no Ko (男の子女の子)	Released: 1972.11.01; Label: CBS Sony; Formats: CD, LP, Cassette tape, digital download, streaming	4
Ai he no Shuppatsu (愛への出発)	Released: 1973.05.01; Label: CBS Sony; Formats: CD, LP, cassette, digital download, streaming	2
Hiromi no Heya (ひろみの部屋)	Released: 1974.01.01; Label: CBS Sony; Formats: CD, LP, cassette, digital download, streaming	2
Hiromi no Asa.Iru.Ban (ひろみの朝・昼・晩)	Released: 1974.06.11; Label: CBS Sony; Formats: CD, LP, cassette, digital download, streaming	2
Hiromi no Tabi (ひろみの旅)	Released: 1975.06.21; Label: CBS Sony; Formats: CD, LP, cassette, digital download, streaming	7
Hiromic World	Released: 1975.11.21; Label: CBS Sony; Formats: CD, LP, cassette, digital download, streaming	5
Machikado no Shinwa (街かどの神話)	Released: 1976.12.05; Label: CBS Sony; Formats: CD, LP, cassette, digital download, streaming	12
Idol NO.1 (アイドルNO.1)	Released: 1977.10.01; Label: CBS Sony; Formats: CD, LP, cassette, digital download, streaming	7
Pyramid Hiromiddo (ピラミッドひろみっど)	Released: 1977.12.21; Label: CBS Sony; Formats: CD, LP, cassette, digital download, streaming	24
Narci-rhythm	Released: 1978.07.21; Label: CBS Sony; Formats: CD, LP, cassette, digital download, streaming	15
Apollon no Koibito (アポロンの恋人)	Released: 1979.04.01; Label: CBS Sony; Formats: CD, LP, cassette, digital download, streaming	14
Lookin' For Tomorrow	Released: 1979.08.01; Label: CBS Sony; Formats: CD, LP, cassette, digital download, streaming	20
Super Drive	Released: 1979.12.21; Label: CBS Sony; Formats: CD, LP, cassette, digital download, streaming	27
Magic	Released: 1980.08.21; Label: CBS Sony; Formats: CD, LP, cassette, digital download, streaming	20
How many Ii Kao (How many いい顔)	Released: 1981.01.01; Label: CBS Sony; Formats: CD, LP, cassette, digital download, streaming	41
Plastic Generation	Released: 1981.05.01; Label: CBS Sony; Formats: CD, LP, cassette, digital download, streaming	20
Asphalt Hero (アスファルト・ヒーロー)	Released: 1981.12.21; Label: CBS Sony; Formats: CD, LP, cassette, digital download, streaming	33
Aishuu no Casablanca (哀愁のカサブランカ)	Released: 1982.09.22; Label: CBS Sony; Formats: CD, LP, cassette, digital download, streaming	2
Ai no Shinwa (愛の神話)	Released: 1982.12.21; Label: CBS Sony; Formats: CD, LP, cassette, digital download, streaming	9
Hiromi Go no Hanzai (比呂魅卿の犯罪)	Released: 1983.04.01; Label: CBS Sony; Formats: CD, LP, cassette, digital download, streaming	6
Tailored Song	Released: 1983.12.21; Label: CBS Sony; Formats: CD, LP, cassette, digital download, streaming	19
Allusion	Released: 1984.12.01; Label: CBS Sony; Formats: CD, LP, cassette, digital download, streaming	20
Labyrinth	Released: 1985.10.02; Label: CBS Sony; Formats: CD, LP, cassette, digital download, streaming	13
Love of Finery	Released: 1987.04.01; Label: CBS Sony; Formats: CD, LP, cassette, digital download, streaming	20
Driving Force	Released: 1989.06.01; Label: CBS Sony; Formats: CD, cassette, digital download, streaming	47
America Kabure (アメリカかぶれ)	Released: 1990.06.01; Label: CBS Sony; Formats: CD, cassette, digital download, streaming	43
Catalonian Blood	Released: 1992.05.02; Label: Sony; Formats: CD, digital download, streaming	-
Luna Lllena	Released: 1993.05.21; Label: Sony; Formats: CD, digital download, streaming	-
GOrgeous	Released: 1994.06.11; Label: Sony; Formats: CD, digital download, streaming	40
I Miss You: Aitakute Shikatanai (I miss you〜逢いたくてしかたない〜)	Released: 1995.07.01; Label: Sony; Formats: CD, digital download, streaming	19
Ku.Se.Ni.Na.Ru (く・せ・に・な・る)	Released: 1996.07.01; Label: Sony; Formats: CD, digital download, streaming	29
Kokoro no Kagi (く・せ・に・な・る)	Released: 1998.06.20; Label: Sony; Formats: CD, digital download, streaming	60
Koi no Hallelujah Daisakusen: Mission Code is "G" (恋のハレルヤ大作戦〜Mission Code is "G")	Released: 2000.07.05; Label: Sony; Formats: CD, digital download, streaming	36
Period	Released: 2001.11.21; Label: Sony; Formats: CD, digital download, streaming	58
Evolution	Released: 2005.09.14; Label: Sony Music; Formats: CD, digital download, streaming	27
place to be	Released: 2008.06.11; Label: Sony Music; Formats: CD, digital download, streaming	29
one and only...	Released: 2010.11.17; Label: Sony Music; Formats: CD, digital download, streaming	19

==== EPs ====
Title	Album details	Peak chart positions
Title	Album details	JPN Oricon
With Whom?	Released: 2001.03.28; Label: Sony; Formats: CD, digital download, streaming	-
Winter Mood	Released: 2006.11.12; Label: Sony Music; Formats: CD, digital download, streaming	55

==== Remix albums ====
Title	Album details	Peak chart positions
Title	Album details	JPN Oricon
Hiromix	Released: 1991.11.21; Label: Sony; Formats: CD, digital download, streaming	-

==== Live albums ====
Title	Album details	Peak chart positions
Title	Album details	JPN Oricon
Hiromi on Stage: Yoroshiku Aishuu (HIROMI ON STAGE〜よろしく哀愁〜)	Released: 1974.12.10; Label: CBS Sony; Formats: LP	4
GO Goes On!(Part1): Hiromi In U.S.A	Released: 1976.8.21; Label: CBS Sony; Formats: LP	4
GO Goes On!(Part2): Hiromi In U.S.A	Released: 1976.9.21; Label: CBS Sony; Formats: LP	7
Hero (ヒーロー)	Released: 1977.5.21; Label: CBS Sony; Formats: LP	8
Phoenix: Hiromi in Budoukan (フェニックス〜HIROMI IN BUDOKAN〜)	Released: 1978.4.1; Label: CBS Sony; Formats: LP	17
Idols of Idols	Released: 1978.10.1; Label: CBS Sony; Formats: 2-LP	22
Super Entertainment My Own Road	Released: 1980.5.21; Label: CBS Sony; Formats: 2-LP	26
At the Starting Live: Ready Set Go!	Released: 1981.9.5; Label: CBS Sony; Formats: LP	21
Concert Tour Labyrinth	Released: 1981.9.5; Label: CBS Sony; Formats: 2-CD	28
Hiromi Go 50th Anniversary Celebration Tour 2022: Keep Singing	Released: 2022.08.03; Label: Sony Music; Formats: 2-CD	15

==== Compilation albums ====
Title	Album details	Peak chart positions
Title	Album details	JPN Oricon
Go Hiromi Deluxe (郷ひろみデラックス)	Released: 1975.06.01; Label: CBS Sony; Formats: 2-LP	8
Go Hiromi Hit Zenkyokushuu (郷ひろみヒット全曲集)	Released: 1975.11.1; Label: CBS Sony; Formats: LP	21
Best of Best Go Hiromi no Subete (ベスト・オブ・ベスト 郷ひろみのすべて)	Released: 1975.06.01; Label: CBS Sony; Formats: 2-LP	64
Go Hiromi Hit Zenkyokushuu (郷ひろみヒット全曲集)	Released: 1976.11.1; Label: CBS Sony; Formats: LP	43
Ninki Touhyou Renzoku Number One Go Hiromi (人気投票連続ナンバー・ワン 郷ひろみ)	Released: 1977.6.21; Label: CBS Sony; Formats: 2-LP	55
GO 1977-1972	Released: 1977.11.01; Label: CBS Sony; Formats: 3-LP	12
The Best Go Hiromi (THE BEST 郷ひろみ)	Released: 1978.6.21; Label: CBS Sony; Formats: LP	50
The Best Go Hiromi (THE BEST 郷ひろみ)	Released: 1978.11.1; Label: CBS Sony; Formats: 2-LP	68
The Best Go Hiromi (THE BEST 郷ひろみ)	Released: 1979.6.21; Label: CBS Sony; Formats: LP	76
The Best Go Hiromi (THE BEST 郷ひろみ)	Released: 1979.11.1; Label: CBS Sony; Formats: 2-LP	75
The Best Go Hiromi (THE BEST 郷ひろみ)	Released: 1980.6.21; Label: CBS Sony; Formats: LP	-
The Best Go Hiromi (THE BEST 郷ひろみ)	Released: 1980.11.1; Label: CBS Sony; Formats: 2-LP	-
Kinjitou Pyramid (金字塔)	Released: 1980.11.1; Label: CBS Sony; Formats: 6-LP	21
The Best Go Hiromi (THE BEST 郷ひろみ)	Released: 1981.11.21; Label: CBS Sony; Formats: LP	-
My Collection (マイコレクション)	Released: 1982.06.21; Label: CBS Sony; Formats: LP	43
The Best Go Hiromi (THE BEST 郷ひろみ)	Released: 1982.11.1; Label: CBS Sony; Formats: LP	37
Ougon Gon (黄金郷)	Released: 1983.11.01; Label: CBS Sony; Formats: LP	22
Ougon Go I: 2 Oku 4 Sen Man no Hitomi (黄金郷I〜2億4千万の瞳〜)	Released: 1984.06.10; Label: CBS Sony; Formats: LP	14
Best Collection (ベスト・コレクション)	Released: 1985.4.1; Label: CBS Sony; Formats: CD	-
Go Hiromi Zenshuu / '72~'85Dandyism (郷ひろみ全集/'72〜'85 DANDYISM)	Released: 1985.4.1; Label: CBS Sony; Formats: 4-CD, music download, streaming	-
Best Collection (ベスト・コレクション)	Released: 1986.05.21; Label: CBS Sony; Formats: CD	299
My Self: Sincerely Yours (MY SELF〜Sincerely yours)	Released: 1987.05.31; Label: CBS Sony; Formats: 3-CD	-
Jumbi Bantan: Vingt Ans (準備万端〜VINGT ANS〜)	Released: 1991.05.22; Label: Sony; Formats: CD, music download, streaming	64
Jumbi Bantan: Vingt Ans Songless (準備万端〜VINGT ANS〜 Songless)	Released: 1991.4.25; Label: Sony; Formats: CD	-
Go Hiromi Zenshuu / '86~'91DANDYISM (郷ひろみ全集/'86〜'91 DANDYISM II)	Released: 1992.02.21; Label: Sony; Formats: 2-CD, music download, streaming	-
The Greatest Hits Of Hiromi Go	Released: 1994.11.02; Label: Sony; Formats: 2-CD, digital download, streaming	73
The Greatest Hits Of Hiromi Go Vol.II: Ballads	Released: 1995.11.22; Label: Sony; Formats: 2-CD, music download, streaming	23
The Greatest Hits Of Hiromi Go Vol.III: Selection	Released: 1996.11.01; Label: Sony; Formats: 2-CD, music download, streaming	79
All The Singles 1972-1997	Released: 1997.8.1; Label: Sony; Formats: 9-CD, music download, streaming	-
The Goldsinger	Released: 1999.8.21; Label: Sony; Formats: CD, music download, streaming	40
Most Loved Hits Of Hiromi Go Vol.1: Heat	Released: 2001.07.04; Label: Sony; Formats: CD, SACD, music download, streaming	60
Most Loved Hits Of Hiromi Go Vol.2: Cool	Released: 2001.07.04; Label: Sony; Formats: CD, SACD, music download, streaming	58
Samba de GO: Hiromi Go Latin Song Collection	Released: 2007.8.8; Label: Sony Music; Formats: CD, CD+DVD, music download, streaming	33
Hiromi Go All Time Best	Released: 2022.12.21; Label: Sony Music; Formats: 3-CD, music download, streaming	15

- Note: Although the 2nd and 4th; 7th to 12th, 14th and 16th; 19th and 21st compilation album title are identical, the track list is different and as result considered as different albums.

==== Box sets ====
Title	Album details	Peak chart positions
Title	Album details	JPN Oricon
Single Collection of Early Days vol.1	Released: 2005.10.5; Label: Sony Music; Formats: 11-CD	-
Single Collection of Early Days vol.2	Released: 2005.10.19; Label: Sony Music; Formats: 11-CD	-
Single Collection of Early Days vol.3	Released: 2005.11.02; Label: Sony Music; Formats: 11-CD	-
Single Collection of Early Days vol.4	Released: 2005.11.16; Label: Sony Music; Formats: 11-CD	-
Single Collection of Early Days vol.5	Released: 2005.11.30; Label: Sony Music; Formats: 11-CD	-
40th anniversary limited box set "LINK"	Released: 2012.3.14; Label: Sony Music; Formats: 3-CD + 1DVD	20
The 70's Albums	Released: 2017.10.18; Label: Sony Music; Formats: 13-CD	21
Hiromi Go All Time Best Box	Released: 2022.12.21; Label: Sony Music; Formats: 5-CD	15

== Videography ==
=== Live albums ===
	Release	Title	Format	Serial No.	Chart
1st	1986.3.21	Hiromi Go Concert Tour "Labyrinth"	VHS	96ZH-105	—N/a
2nd	1990.10.21	Go Hiromi Concert Tour’90 "America Kabure"	VHS	CSVM-210	—N/a
3rd	1992.5.1	Dedication 20 years a GO: A new departure Anniversary Films	2-VHS	SRVM-316/7	—N/a
4th	1994.11.21	The Greatest Hits of Hiromi Go-Hiromi Go Concert Tour '94	VHS	SRVM-416	—N/a
5th	1996.3.1	Hiromi Go Historic Collection Now and Then	VHS	SRVM-505	—N/a
6th	1996.12.1	Hiromi Go Concert Tour ’96 "Ku.se.ni.na.ru"	VHS	SRVM-555	—N/a
7th	1997.11.1	Go Hiromi Debut 25 Shuunen Kinen Video "One And Only Vol.3 Hiromix World Live at Nippon Budokan 1997.9.12"	VHS	SRVM-5598	—N/a
8th	2000.9.20	Hiromi Go Concert Tour 2000 Koi no Hallelujah Daisakusen	VHS	SRVM-5702	—N/a
8th	2000.9.20	Hiromi Go Concert Tour 2000 Koi no Hallelujah Daisakusen	DVD	SRBL-1086	—N/a
9th	2002.1.17	Most Loved Hits of Hiromi Go	VHS	SRVL-5732	—N/a
9th	2002.1.17	Most Loved Hits of Hiromi Go	DVD	SRBL-1132	—N/a
10th	2006.3.24	Hiromi Go Concert Tour 2005”Evolution”	DVD	SRBL-1276	74
11th	2007.1.17	Delight&Devotion! Hiromi Go Live 35th Anniversary Celebration 2006	DVD	SRBL-1294	57
12th	2007.12.5	Hiromi Go Concert Tour 2007 Boom! Boom! Boom!	DVD	SRBL-1329	38
13th	2008.12.10	Hiromi Go Concert Tour 2008 "The Place to Be"	DVD+CD	SRBL-1375/6	23
13th	2008.12.10	Hiromi Go Concert Tour 2008 "The Place to Be"	DVD	SRBL-1377	23
14th	2009.12.23日	Hiromi Go Concert Tour 2009 "Dan Gan Groove!"	2-DVD	SRBL-1418/9	49
14th	2009.12.23日	Hiromi Go Concert Tour 2009 "Dan Gan Groove!"	DVD	SRBL-1420	49
15th	2011.1.12	Hiromi Go Concert Tour 2010 55!! Densetsu Final: Big Birthday	2DVD+CD-ROM	SRBL-1457/9	3
15th	2011.1.12	Hiromi Go Concert Tour 2010 55!! Densetsu Final: Big Birthday	DVD	SRBL-1460	3
16th	2011.12.21	Hiromi Go Concert 40th Anniversary Celebration 2011 GIFT: 40Nen no Okurimono	2-DVD	SRBL-1503/4	40
16th	2011.12.21	Hiromi Go Concert 40th Anniversary Celebration 2011 GIFT: 40Nen no Okurimono	DVD	SRBL-1505	40
17th	2012.12.5	Hiromi GO Concert Tour 2012 “Link”	DVD	SRBL-1544	15
17th	2012.12.5	Hiromi GO Concert Tour 2012 “Link”	DVD	SRBL-1545	15
17th	2012.12.5	Hiromi GO Concert Tour 2012 “Link”	Blu-ray	SRXL-34	28
17th	2012.12.5	Hiromi GO Concert Tour 2012 “Link”	Blu-ray	SRXL-35	28
18th	2013.12.4	Hiromi Go Discotheque Tour 2013 “Let’s Groove”	DVD	SRBL-1595	21
18th	2013.12.4	Hiromi Go Discotheque Tour 2013 “Let’s Groove”	Blu-ray	SRXL-47	26
19th	2014.12.3	Hiromi Go Concert Tour 2014“Never End”	DVD	SRBL-1636	22
19th	2014.12.3	Hiromi Go Concert Tour 2014“Never End”	Blu-ray	SRXL-59	32
20th	2016.1.20	Hiromi Go Concert Tour 2015 The Gold	DVD	SRBL-1689	12
20th	2016.1.20	Hiromi Go Concert Tour 2015 The Gold	Blu-ray	SRXL-89	21
21st	2016.6.1	Special Concert 2016 Hiromi Go & The Orchestra at Suntory Hall	DVD	SRBL-1700	13
21st	2016.6.1	Special Concert 2016 Hiromi Go & The Orchestra at Suntory Hall	Blu-ray	SRXL-93	17
22nd	2016.10.26	Go Hiromi To iu Iki Kata: 60sai no Entertainer	DVD	SRBW-40	26
22nd	2016.10.26	Go Hiromi To iu Iki Kata: 60sai no Entertainer	Blu-ray	SRXW-1	43
23rd	2017.1.25	Hiromi Go Concert Tour 2016 New World	DVD	SRBL-1737	17
23rd	2017.1.25	Hiromi Go Concert Tour 2016 New World	Blu-ray	SRXL-119	43
24th	2018.1.24	Hiromi Go Concert Tour 2017“My Dear...”	DVD	SRBL-1774	13
24th	2018.1.24	Hiromi Go Concert Tour 2017“My Dear...”	Blu-ray	SRXL-146	29
25th	2019.1.23	Hiromi Go Concert Tour 2018 Urvan Velocity: UV	DVD+CD	SRBL-1837/8	14
25th	2019.1.23	Hiromi Go Concert Tour 2018 Urvan Velocity: UV	Blu-ray+CD	SRXL-194/5	14
26th	2019.11.27	Hiromi Go Concert Tour 2019“Brand-New Exotic”	DVD+CD	SRBL-1881/2	13
26th	2019.11.27	Hiromi Go Concert Tour 2019“Brand-New Exotic”	Blu-ray+CD	SRXL-224/5	26
27th	2021.3.31	Hiromi Go Concert Tour 2020-2021“The Golden Hits”	DVD+CD	SRBL-1982/3	7
27th	2021.3.31	Hiromi Go Concert Tour 2020-2021“The Golden Hits”	Blu-ray+CD	SRXL-306/7	18
28th	2022.02.01	Hiromi Go Concert Tour 2021 “Beside The Life” More Than The Golden Hits	DVD	SRBL-1994	4
28th	2022.02.01	Hiromi Go Concert Tour 2021 “Beside The Life” More Than The Golden Hits	Blu-ray	SRXL-321	5
29th	2023.04.26	Hiromi Go Anniversary "Special Version" 50 times 50 in 2022	2-DVD	SRBL-2134/6	7
29th	2023.04.26	Hiromi Go Anniversary "Special Version" 50 times 50 in 2022	2-Blu-ray	SRXL-416/7	18
30th	2023.12.20	Hiromi Go Concert Tour 2023 New Intentions	2-DVD	SRBL-2198/9	17
30th	2023.12.20	Hiromi Go Concert Tour 2023 New Intentions	2-Blu-ray	SRXL-453/4	-

=== Music-video albums ===
	Release	Title	Format	Serial No.	Chart
1st	1994.11.21	I miss you (Aitakute Shikatanai) Hiromi Go Ballads Collection	VHS	SRVM-466	—N/a
2nd	1996.7.1	Hiromi Go Video Clips ’96 "Ku.se.ni.na.ru"	VHS	SRVM-527	—N/a
3rd	1997.11.1	Go Hiromi Debut 25 Shuunen Kinen Video "One And Only Vol.1 production work"	VHS	SRVM-5596	—N/a
4th	1997.11.1	Go Hiromi Debut 25 Shuunen Kinen Video "One And Only Vol.2 Document 1996〜1997"	VHS	SRVM-5597	—N/a
5th	2000.4.19	Goldfinger’99: Hiromi Go Clips	VHS	SRVM-5686	—N/a
5th	2000.4.19	Goldfinger’99: Hiromi Go Clips	DVD	SRBL-1048	—N/a
6th	2000.7.18	Nakatta Koto ni Shite: Hiromi Go Clips	VHS	SRVM-5696	—N/a
6th	2000.7.18	Nakatta Koto ni Shite: Hiromi Go Clips	DVD	SRBL-1081	—N/a

=== Video box sets ===
	Release	Title	Format	Serial No.	Chart
1st	2002.6.19.	HIROMI GO DVD COLLECTION Vol.1 〜LIVES & CLIPS〜	11DVD	SRBL-1141/51	—N/a
2nd	2002.11.20	HIROMI GO DVD COLLECTION Vol.2: Movies	11DVD	SRBL-1161/71	—N/a
3rd	2023.10.18	Hiromi Go in Yoru no Hit Studio	7-DVD	PCBC-61679	2

== Filmography ==
=== Film ===
- MacArthur's Children (1984), Masao Nakai
- Gonza the Spearman (1984), Gonza – lead role
- Comic Magazine (1986)
- Samurai Cowboy (1993), Yutaka Sato

=== Drama ===
- Shin Heike Monogatari (1972), Taira no Tsunemori
- Kusa Moeru (1979), Minamoto no Yoriie
- Nobunaga: King of Zipangu (1992), Tokugawa Ieyasu
- Iron Chef (1998)
- The Emperor's Cook (2015)

=== Television programs ===
- Everyone's Best Kouhaku 100th Anniversary of Broadcasting Special (NHK, 2025) (cast)

== Other media ==
=== Radio dramas ===
- Kaze to Ki no Uta (c. 1970s), Gilbert Cocteau – TBS Radio drama written by Mann Izawa, based on the 1976 manga of the same name by Keiko Takemiya

== See also ==
- List of best-selling music artists in Japan
