= Ravensong =

1993 novel by Lee Maracle

Ravensong is a novel written by the contemporary Canadian author, Lee Maracle. It was published by Press Gang Publishers in 1993 and reissued by Canadian Scholars' Press/Women's Press in 2011.

== Setting ==
The novel takes place in 1954, in two small Canadian villages in British Columbia, one largely populated by First Nations people and the other with a largely white Euro-Canadian population.

== Characters ==
The protagonist of the novel is Stacey, a First Nations girl in her late teens who is attending a high school for non-native residents. Some other important characters include Stacey's sister Celia and brother Young Jim; Rena a "two-spirit" (lesbian) and her partner German Judy; and Madeline, a Saulteaux woman from Manitoba. The Raven is a crucial element in this novel; she represents a traditional Native Canadian trickster, inflicting sickness upon the people. She functions as a messenger of "cross-cultural communication" throughout the novel. (Eigenbrod 2005: 89). German and Madeline play an important role in helping to develop Stacey's perceptions of society. The characters form two ethnic communities which divide the population based on whether one is a native of Canada.

== Narration ==
The novel is told from "several perspectives within the community". In the epilogue, the storytellers are presented as Stacey, Celia, and Rena. However, Stacey's perspective is the most relevant.

== Themes ==
=== Sexual and ethnic discrimination ===
Due to their sexual orientation, the two lesbian characters, German Judy and Rena, are being ostracized (Eigenbrod 2005: 93) by the Native community. Due to Judy's German origins, she is more affected by discriminating and even "dehumanizing" (Eigenbrod 2005: 94) attitudes than her partner, Rena, who has Native origins. Rena is regarded as a respectable figure regardless of her homosexuality. This demonstrates that it is ethnicity rather than sexual orientation that plays an important role in the Native community.

=== Nature ===
Nature is the main source of the Native community's food supply and medications. The perception of nature by the younger members of the tribe is highly influenced by the older generations. All of their knowledge about the edible plants and their uses are inherited from the elders. This is evident in Stacey, who learns this art from her mother. Stacey's mother teaches her to use the plants and respect the Earth for all its gifts. The extent to which the villagers depend on nature in their everyday existence is shown in the novel when a summer drought deprives the village of supplies. Thus, the novel manifests the insignificance and weakness of humankind against nature.

=== Sexuality and love ===
The awakening of Stacey's sexual awareness takes place upon learning about her friend's sexual initiation. Despite the presence of a romantic aspect in her adolescence, she does not yield to Steve's love for her. The ethnic differences between them is their main obstacle.

=== Raven ===
The Raven's function in the novel is primarily that of a trickster and transformer. His role is to bring both communities, the Native Canadian villagers and the inhabitants of Maillardville, together, and encourage a deeper mutual understanding between them. The means to achieve that is by a sickness that Raven sent to both the communities. The trickster figure of the Raven impacts not only the whole groups but also the lives of individuals which is something the young members of the tribe must themselves discover.
