= Bette Bourne =

British actor (1939–2024)

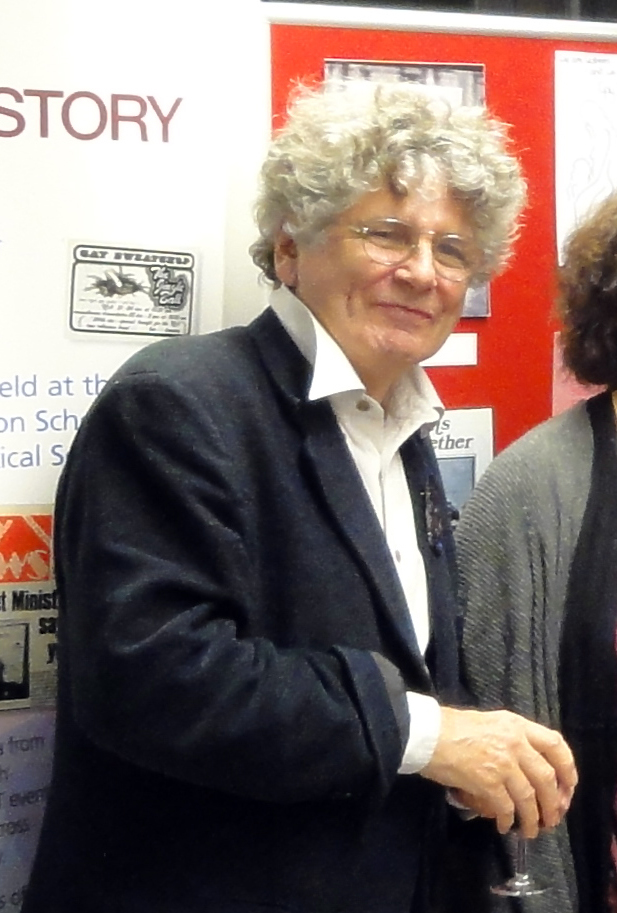
- Bourne in 2010
- Born: Peter Bourne; 22 September 1939; Hackney, London, England
- Died: 23 August 2024 (aged 84); Notting Hill, London, England
- Education: Central School of Speech and Drama
- Occupation: Actor
- Years active: 1943–2022
- Notable work: The Vortex, Donmar Warehouse, 2002
- Family: Mike Berry (brother)
- Awards: Clarence Derwent Award 2003, OBIE Award for Performance (2001, 1991), Manchester Evening News Award

Bette Bourne (/ˈbɛti/; born Peter Bourne; 22 September 1939 – 23 August 2024) was a British actor, drag queen, and activist. His theatrical career spanned six decades. He came to prominence in the mid-1970s when he adopted the name "Bette" and a radical posture on gay liberation. He joined the New York-based alternative gay cabaret troupe Hot Peaches on a tour of Europe and then founded his own alternative London-based gay theatrical company, Bloolips, which lasted until 1994.

Beginning in the 1990s, Bourne took on more traditional acting assignments in both male and female roles, sometimes in fringe theatres and campy new dramas, but also in classics by Shakespeare, Oscar Wilde, and Noel Coward. He toured widely in one-man biographical shows playing Quentin Crisp and as himself. He generally eschewed such labels as drag queen or female impersonator, preferring to describe himself as "a gay man in a frock". Rather than "mimic a male stereotypical conception of womanhood", wrote one theatre journalist, Bourne sought "to find a different way of being a man". Asked in 2010 if he had left his radical politics behind he said: "One doesn't just stop being what one is. I'm still out there, still full of fury and rage, but on the whole I do try to keep up a very pleasant façade."

== Early life ==
Peter Bourne was born in Hackney, East London, into a working-class family. He had two sisters and a brother (actor and singer Mike Berry). His mother was an amateur actress.

Bourne made his stage debut at the age of four with Madame Behenna and her Dancing Children performing at Stoke Newington Town Hall where he sang "Don't Sit Under the Apple Tree". The first play he remembered seeing was a production of Thornton Wilder's Our Town in the early 1950s, although he had an interest in acting before that. His father was indifferent to his son's acting aspirations. When Bourne was 16, he did a three-month apprenticeship as a printmaker. He then worked in journalism at the New Scientist. Bourne began his theatre career working as a stagehand.

== 1960s performances ==
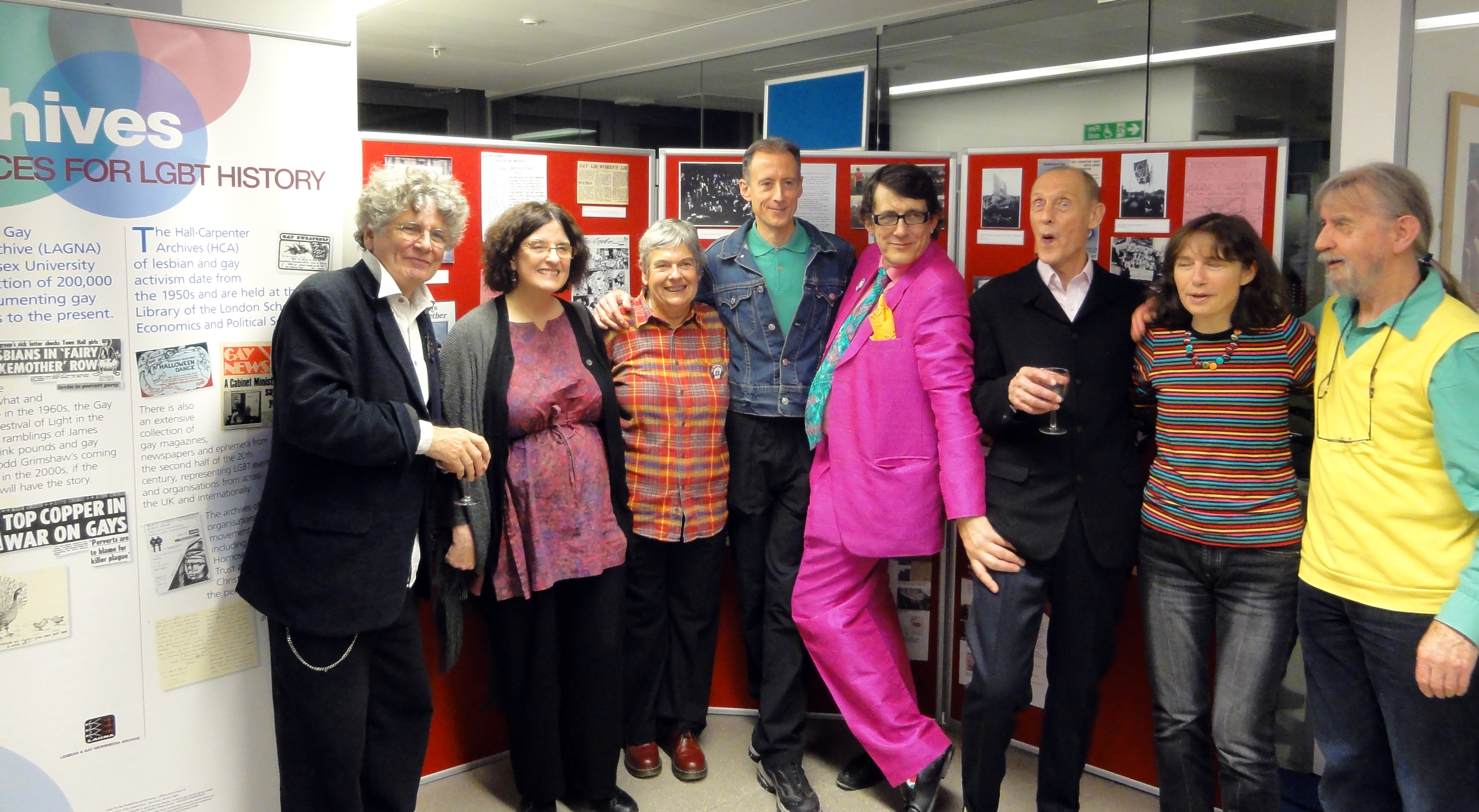
Bette Bourne (left) with other original GLF activists at a 40th anniversary celebration in the LSE

Bourne studied drama at London's Central School of Speech and Drama in Swiss Cottage. In the 1960s he appeared, credited as Peter Bourne, in several episodes of TV series, including Dixon of Dock Green, The Avengers, and The Prisoner.

From August 1969 to March 1970, still as Peter, he performed alongside Sir Ian McKellen in a Prospect Theatre Company touring double bill of Christopher Marlowe's Edward II and Shakespeare's Richard II.

== Activism and cabaret career ==
In the 1970s, feeling disillusioned with show business, Bourne put his acting career on hold to become an activist with the Gay Liberation Front. He became a part of a gay commune based in Colville Terrace in Notting Hill, London.

Years later Bourne recalled the political transformation. Before the change in gay consciousness that came in the 1970s, he said, "The drag queens would be making the most terrible crude jokes about women but we'd be laughing along." Eventually motivated by anger at harassment and the attraction of a growing counterculture, he took to wearing women's clothing: "It wasn't about impersonating a woman. It was about trying to find a new sort of man, to really question what a man was.... Putting on a skirt, putting on some make-up, it changed the agenda, the way that you thought and spoke." He said others began calling him "Bette" and he adopted the name.

Bourne recalled how the early participation of men in drag in a public demonstration in the early 1970s disturbed more traditional civil rights advocates: "A lot of the queens were very afraid of us because we were disobeying the rules in some deep way and scaring them. People got very frightened. We weren’t frightening at all. But it was much stronger than anything they were doing. It was also about a sense of humour or not. Wearing the dresses was great fun as well. It certainly was for me."

In 1976, Bourne joined the New York-based gay cabaret troupe Hot Peaches on a European tour that culminated in a show at the Institute of Contemporary Arts in London. Bourne remained there when the troupe returned to New York City.

=== Bloolips ===
In London Bourne founded an all-male gay musical comedy company, Bloolips. In addition to Bourne, who took the leading role, original members were Lavinia Co-op, Precious Pearl, Diva Dan, and Gretel Feather. Between 1977 and 1994, there were around 25 members in the troupe. The company employed John Taylor to provide scripts, and later Ray Dobbins. The productions combined satirical political comedy with tap dancing and singing, with the men in clown-like costumes rather than in female attire or as female impersonators.

The shows drew heavily on the glamour of the 1920s and 1930s golden era of Hollywood and Broadway theatre. They were staged, produced, and directed in the vaudeville tradition. The scenery and costumes were designed to look tawdry and down-at-heel. The actors made their own costumes on a limited budget "out of plastic laundry baskets, broken lampshades, and tat from second-hand shops, sometimes using mops as wigs", Co-op recalled. "The first Bloolips rehearsals were done in my flat in Notting Hill, seven of us tap dancing in a line.", Bourne told The Guardian in 2005.

The shows featured adaptations of such well-known numbers as "We're in the Money" and original songs like "I'm Mad about Leisure", "I Want to Be Bad", and "I'd Love to Dance the Tango but my Suit Says No". Many of the show's titles and plots were adapted from well-known movies, including Lust in Space, Gland Hotel, and Get Hur.

Bloolips was first and foremost a vehicle for Bourne, both his insistence on managing his career and showcasing his talents. The troupe premiered their first show at The Tabernacle, Notting Hill, in Powis Square in August 1978 and were, according to Bourne, "a sensation". It became a regular practice for the troupe to premiere their productions at The Tabernacle to benefit the local community.

Bloolips performed in New York in 1980, opening off-off Broadway at the New City Theater, moving to the off-Broadway Orpheum Theatre, and closing in June 1981. Its production of Lust in Space won the OBIE Award for best costumes.

New York Times critic Mel Gussow lavished praise on Lust in Space and the cast of six: "Bloolips are bizarrely funny. It's not what you do, but how you do it. They tap-dance with clattering precision, harmonize on old sounding tunes and never forget the parodistic nature of their endeavour, imitating everyone from dim-witted ingenues to flamboyant femmes fatales." In 1993 one reviewer wrote: "If Busby Berkeley had concocted a musical about Ancient Rome and cast it with English music-hall comics who love to dress up like chorines, it might look like Get Hur."

Bloolips shows

Bloolips performed 13 shows before disbanding in 1998. These included:

- The Ugly Duckling (1978–79)
- Cheek! (1978)
- Vamp and Camp (1979)
- Lust in Space (1980–82)
- Yum Yum (1983)
- Odds 'n Sods (1983–84)
- Sticky Buns (1983–84)
- Living Leg-ends (1985)
- Slung Back and Strapless (1986–87)
- Teenage Trash (1987–88)
- Gland Hotel (1988–90)
- Get Hur (1993)
- The Island of Lost Shoes (1995)

In 1988, Bloolips toured Canada, visiting Halifax, Nova Scotia, and Ottawa in a Best of Bloolips production.

A documentary movie shot in New York City in 1993 and titled Bloolips contains footage of the troupe performing Get Hur, as well as backstage footage and interviews with Bourne and other members of the cast.

== Acting career ==
In 1990, Bourne and Paul Shaw appeared with Lois Weaver and Peggy Shaw in Belle Reprieve, which Bourne and Shaw had a hand in writing. The play was produced by Split Britches and performed in London, New York, San Francisco, Boston, and Seattle. The show won an OBIE Award for Ensemble Production in 1991. In the New York Times, a reviewer dismissed the show's claim to be a "musical sendup" of Tennessee Williams's A Streetcar Named Desire and wrote that it was a cabaret act that referenced that play "only as a point of departure" and "there is little to connect the two works, even as a takeoff". He praised some of the musical numbers–"another number in which three paper lanterns do a tap dance is lively"–but judged the show "sophomoric" with "little originality". He noted the four actors' "energy".

In 1991, Bourne appeared as the 250-year-old La Zambinella in Neil Bartlett and Nick Bloomfield's production of Sarrasine at New York's Dance Theater Workshop. Stephen Holden called it a "bravura performance" and described Bourne as "a phantasmal apotheosis of a renegade erotic spirit, at once a ruined (though regal) grand dame and a sad clown". Bourne reprised that role at the Lyric Hammersmith in 1996.

On 9 October 1994, he joined McKellen, Stephen Fry, and others in a benefit reading of Wilde's The Ballad of Reading Gaol at the Lyric Theatre in Hammersmith that was broadcast on BBC Radio 3.

In 1997, Bourne performed in New York City in a production of Ray Dobbins' one-man show East of Eadie. The New York Times reviewer found much to criticize but thought Bourne had "some excellent material" and "gives the impression of being able to charm by just standing there". She praised Bourne's "splendid Noel Coward imitation" singing "Why Must the Frock Go On?" and the way he delivered his lines in his "wonderful, deep Tallulah-like voice". That same year Bourne won a Manchester Evening News award for his performance as Lady Bracknell in the English Touring Theatre production of Wilde's The Importance of Being Earnest. That role was Bourne's first as a female impersonator, chosen only after he determined that "a caricature was not required".

In 1998, Bourne and Shaw visited the US with a best of Bloolips production tilted Bloo Revue: A Bloolips Retrospectacle, a series of sketches "in an extremely loopy vein", said one glowing review.

In 1999, Bourne played his friend Quentin Crisp in Tim Fountain's play, Resident Alien, at London's Bush Theatre. The production toured widely and played in New York City and Sydney. Ben Brantley described its New York incarnation as "a compilation of wit, wisdom and reminiscence, delivered by an elderly person for whom personal style is a life force" and praised Bourne for "a performance that sweetens clinical observation with beneath-the-skin empathy". Bourne's work received an OBIE for performance. At the Edinburgh Festival Fringe in 2001, Bourne won a Herald Award for his portrayal of Crisp. Fountain wrote two more plays for Bourne: H-O-T-B-O-I, which was produced at the Soho Theatre in 2004, and Rock in 2008.

Bourne played the role of Pauncefort Quentin in the Donmar Warehouse production of Noël Coward's The Vortex in 2002, for which he won the Clarence Derwent Award. In 2005, he appeared in Ray Dobbins' Read My Hips at London's Drill Hall, playing the gay 20th-century Greek poet Cavafy.

Bourne worked with Bartlett again at the Lyric Hammersmith in 2003, as the narrator in a production of Shakespeare's Pericles, Prince of Tyre starring Will Keen. More Shakespeare followed in 2004 when Bourne played the nurse in Romeo and Juliet at Shakespeare's Globe.

In 2005 at the Royal National Theatre Bourne played in Improbable Theatre's stage adaptation of the film Theatre of Blood. For the Royal Shakespeare Company, Bourne played Dogberry in Shakespeare's Much Ado About Nothing at London's Novello Theatre in 2007. In Variety David Benedict wrote that the director dealt with the "usually unfunny" character by casting Bourne, who "plays marvelously high-status as a doddering gay captain of the guard and savors every last syllable of his character's language-mangling to high comic effect".

That same year Bourne worked with the playwright Mark Ravenhill on a short play, Ripper, staged at the Union Theatre in London. Bourne played the role of Queen Victoria.

In 2009, Bourne talked about his life in A Life in Three Acts at the Traverse Theatre, Edinburgh, a staged reading of transcripts of conversations with playwright Mark Ravenhill.

In 2013, Bourne and Shaw gave a special retrospective performance titled A Right Pair, charting their journey together over 40 years with monologues and turns from selected productions. In 2022, Bette appeared alongside Shaw as the Queen at Duckie's Alternative Royal Command event held at the Queen Elizabeth Hall, part of the Platinum Jubilee celebrations.

== Tributes ==
In 2014, Bourne featured in a documentary film about his life and work, It Goes with the Shoes, written and directed by Mark Ravenhill. In The Guardian, Leslie Felperin called it "practically a microcosm of 20th-century gay culture" and called the archive material "ace".

In 2019, an exhibition celebrating the legacy of Bloolips, In Pictures: Bloolips and the Empowering Joy of Dressing Up, was mounted at Platform Southwark in London.

== Personal life and death ==
In the summer of 1964, Bourne had an affair with Brian Epstein (the Beatles manager). Bourne was aged 23 at the time and featured in a West End production. Their relationship lasted a couple of months and was serious enough for Epstein to trust Bourne with a door key to his Knightsbridge apartment.

Bourne died at his home in Notting Hill, London, on 23 August 2024, at the age of 84, where he had lived since the late 1970s.

== Acting credits ==
=== Theatre ===
- Marlowe's Edward II (Edmund of Kent), Prospect Theatre Company, Edinburgh Festival & West End, 1969–70
- Shakespeare's Richard II (Sir Henry Green and Abbott of Westminster), Prospect Theatre Company, Edinburgh Festival & West End, 1969–70
- Bartlett's A Vision of Love Revealed in Sleep, Gloria [production company] at The Drill Hall, London, 1989 and 1990
- Shakespeare's As You Like It (Jaques), Regent's Park Open Air Théâtre, 1992
- Wilde's The Importance of Being Earnest (Lady Bracknell), 1995
- Bartlett's Sarrasine (La Zambinella), Lyric Hammersmith, London, 1996
- Orton's Funeral Games (Pringle), Drill Hall, London, 1996
- Ray Dobbins' East of Eadie (Eadie), Performance Space 122, New York, 1997
- Fountain's Resident Alien (Quentin Crisp), Bush Theatre, London, 1999
- Coward's The Vortex (Pauncefort Quentin), Donmar Warehouse, London, 2002
- Shakespeare's Pericles, Prince of Tyre (Narrator), Lyric Hammersmith, London, 2003
- Shakespeare's Romeo and Juliet (nurse), Shakespeare's Globe, 2004
- Wilder's The Skin of Our Teeth (Esmeralda, Homer), Young Vic, London, 2004
- Fountain's H-O-T-B-O-I (Reg), Soho Theatre, London, 2004
- Ray Dobbins' Read My Hips (Cavafy), The Drill Hall, London, 2005
- Simpson and McDermott's Theatre of Blood (Michael Merridew), Royal National Theatre, London, 2005
- Mark Ravenhill's Ripper (Queen Victoria), Union Theatre, London, 2007
- Shakespeare's Much Ado About Nothing (Dogberry), Novello Theatre, London, 2007
- Fountain's Rock (Henry Willson), Oval House Theatre, London, 2008
- A Life in Three Acts (as himself), Traverse Theatre, Edinburgh, 2009
- A Life in Three Acts (as himself), The Hague, 2009
- A Life in Three Acts (as himself), Soho Theatre, London, 2010
- A Life in Three Acts (himself), St. Ann's Warehouse, Brooklyn, 2010
- A Right Pair (himself), Brighton Festival Fringe, 2012
- Shakespeare's Macbeth (porter), Shakespeare's Globe Theatre, 2013
- Che Walker and Arthur Darvill's The Lightning Child (Tiresias), Shakespeare's Globe Theatre, 2013

=== Film ===
- Caught Looking (narrator), 1991
- My Summer Vacation (English interviewee), 1996; directed by Sky Gilbert, released to retail stores
- Chéri (Baroness), 2009
- Macbeth (porter), 2013; filmed version of the Shakespeare's Globe production
- It Goes with the Shoes (himself), 2014; documentary

=== Television ===
- Dixon of Dock Green (1963) – Robert
- Dixon of Dock Green (1964)– Blackie
- Dixon of Dock Green (1965) – Matcham
- The Avengers (1966) – Allen
- The Prisoner (1967) – Projection Operator
- The Saint (1967) – Perry
- The Baron (1967) – Peter
- The Avengers (1968) – Preece
- Edward II (1970) – Edmund of Kent; telefilm based on the 1969 Prospect Theatre Company production
- A Little Bit of Lippy (1992) – Venus Lamour; ScreenPlay, season 7, episode 9, aired 16 September 1992
