= Blackfly (TV series) =

Canadian sitcom

- Created by: Ron James
- Starring: Ron James; Colin Mochrie; Cheri Maracle; Lorne Cardinal
- Country of origin: Canada
- No. of seasons: 2
- No. of episodes: 26

Production
- Running time: 30 minutes
- Production company: Salter Street Films

Original release
- Network: Global Television Network
- Release: January 3, 2001 – 2002

Blackfly is a Canadian sitcom which ran on the Global Television Network for two seasons in 2001 and 2002. Although shot single-camera like most Canadian comedies, this series was shot on videotape and contains a laugh track rather than making use of the usual live audience because most scenes take place outdoors.

== Premise ==
The show is set in 18th-century Canada back "in days when beaver fur was good as gold" and features a twisted "Blackadder meets F Troop"-style Canadian history in which Benny "Blackfly" Broughton (Ron James), a Maritimes-born undersized but ambitious general jack-of-all-trades at the isolated Fort Simpson-Eaton on the colonial Canadian frontier, is joined by the prissy by-the-book upper class British officer Corporal Entwhistle (Colin Mochrie) whom he is usually able to talk into his latest doomed-to-failure get-rich-quick scheme.

Other characters include Blackfly's boss at the Hudson's Bay Company-style trading post, the rowdy, penny-pinching Scottish storekeeper MacTavish (James Kee); Misty Moon (Cheri Maracle), a wryly wise native barkeep who loves watching the white man blow his money on whisky at her Leg Hold Trap Bar between visits by her boisterous if distinctly anglophobic French Canadian voyageur lover Ti Jean (Marcel Jeannin); tough but good-natured local tribal leader Chief Smack-Your-Face-In (Lorne Cardinal); masochistic and desperate-to-be-martyred Jesuit priest Brother Jacques (Stephen Coats); the deranged and drunken fort commander Colonel Boyle (Richard Donat); and his buxom blond daughter Lady Hammond (Shauna Black), the hot-blooded young princess of privilege who had no idea what she was getting into when she decided to join her father in Canada after becoming a widow.

Changes to the show during the second season included the arrival of Misty's nasty little witch of a mother Mugwump Moon (Madeleine Bergeron) and the departure of Entwhistle who had inherited his twin brother's title and estate in England, although with his usual luck he found himself stuck back at the fort by the end of the series. The laugh track was removed as James was displeased with the use of it in the first season.

== Production and distribution ==
The show was produced by Salter Street Films. A standalone pilot was produced in 1999, shot in Nova Scotia primarily at the Fortress of Louisbourg and the Port-Royal National Historic Site. The pilot was aired by Global in August 1999, and the network greenlit a full series at its 2000-01 upfronts.

The series premiered January 3, 2001. The network subsequently renewed the show for a second season, which premiered in December 2001 and ran into the winter of 2002.

The network did not renew the series for a third season.

== Critical response ==
John Doyle of The Globe and Mail wrote that the series "is far from being a first-rate TV comedy, but it's very refreshing...The humour is broad, often childish and sometimes it's groan-inducing and flat. For all of that, the show's sheer perversity is a delight. It views the characters of Canadian history as feckless braggarts, the idiot sons of the British upper classes and an assortment of other fools. The French-Canadian characters are belligerent, beer-swilling imbeciles and the only people with an ounce of sense are the natives. They're the ones with a sense of humour and they're far more articulate than the allegedly intrepid English. In a sly twist, they actually understand the land treaties better than the English."

Joel Rubinoff of the Waterloo Region Record dismissed the show as "the kind of stuff your grand-parents -- or maybe your great-grandparents -- might have found funny back in, say, the late 1920s, when vaudeville was king and the broader the humour, the more easily it was understood."

Although Tony Atherton of the Ottawa Citizen had praised the original pilot's potential, he was dismissive of the full series, writing that "in an age of sophisticated satire and withering sarcasm, Blackfly is a broad farce with pratfalls, implausible caricatures, misconstrued meanings and punchlines you can spot clear across a pile of beaver pelts. Think of F Troop, the 1965 U.S. sitcom that made the Old West look really stupid. Then add Benny Hill, the leering British sketch show, which nudged and winked through the '60s and didn't evolve a whit in the decades that followed. You end up with Blackfly, a goofy, double-entendre-ridden, U.S.- British hybrid that might be called Carry on North of Superior."
