= Tom Glass (chuckwagon racer) =

Canadian actor, chuckwagon racer and stuntman (1948–2026)

- Born: Thomas William Glass; December 8, 1948
- Died: June 26, 2026 (aged 77); Diamond Valley, Alberta, Canada
- Occupations: Actor, chuckwagon racer, stuntman
- Spouse: Joanne Glass
- Children: 3

Thomas William Glass (December 8, 1948 – June 26, 2026) was a Canadian actor, chuckwagon racer and stuntman.

== Early life and career ==
Glass was the son of Ronald and Iris Glass. At the age of fourteen, he began his career as an outrider, and won his first Ponoka Stampede in 1972. His brother was killed at the Calgary Stampede in the 1970s. In 1974, he won the Last Chance Chuckwagon races in Lethbridge, Alberta, and in 1980, he won the North American Chuckwagon Racing Championship.

He began his screen career in 1970, performing an uncredited stunt in the film Moonfire. Later in his career, he appeared and performed stunts in numerous films such as Draw!, Naked Gun 33 1/3: The Final Insult, High Noon, Beverly Hills Cop, Stop! Or My Mom Will Shoot, Snow Day, Cool Runnings, Happy Gilmore, Bird on a Wire and Stakeout. He also performed a truck stunt in the NBC detective drama television series The Rockford Files, and in 2001, he was nominated for a Taurus World Stunt Award in the category Best Fight for the film Shanghai Noon.

In 2013, Glass was inducted into the Alberta Sports Hall of Fame.

== Personal life and death ==
Glass was married to Joanne. They had three children. Their marriage lasted until his death in 2026.

Glass died at the Oilfields General Hospital in Diamond Valley, Alberta, on June 26, 2026, at the age of 77.
