= The Unnatural and Accidental Women =

Play by Metis playwright Marie Clements

- Original language: English
- Written by: Marie Clements
- Subject: Missing and murdered Indigenous women, Gilbert Paul Jordan
- Setting: Downtown Eastside of Vancouver

Premiere
- Date: November 2, 2000
- Place: Firehall Arts Centre, Vancouver, British Columbia, Canada

The Unnatural and Accidental Women is a play by Metis playwright Marie Clements about the disappearance of multiple Indigenous women from the Downtown Eastside of Vancouver whose deaths of extremely high blood-alcohol levels were all caused by one man, Gilbert Paul Jordan.

In an attempt to reclaim the lives and importance of the victims, which was largely ignored by press coverage of the Jordan case, Clements' play is a surrealist exploration that jumps around in time to show the women in the final days before their deaths. Through the figure of the daughter of one of the victims, who is searching for answers to her mother's disappearance, the women are brought back to life and talk about their hopes, desires, and challenges as residents of "Skid Row" in Vancouver.

== Characters ==
- Rebecca — ages 4 and 30, Mixed blood/Native, a writer
- Rose — age 52, English immigrant
- Aunt Shadie — age 52, Native, later revealed to be Rebecca's mother
- Mavis — age 42, Native
- The Woman — age 27, Native
- Valerie — age 33, Native
- Verna — age 38, Native
- Violet — ages 27 and 5, Mixed blood/Afro-Canadian
- The Barbershop Women: a singing, dancing trio
  - Marilyn — age 25, Native
  - Penny — age 30, Native
  - Patsy — age 40, Native
- The Barber — ages 30s and 60s, white
- Ron — age 35, a cop

== Production history ==
The Unnatural and Accidental Women premiered on November 2, 2000, and ran until November 25 at the Firehall Arts Centre in Vancouver.

Produced by Native Earth Performing Arts at Buddies in Bad Times Theatre from November 18 to December 5, 2004.

In 2019, as the first presentation of the National Arts Centre's (NAC) Indigenous Theatre department, the NAC staged The Unnatural and Accidental Women. The production was directed by Muriel Miguel and starred PJ Prudat as Rebecca and Monique Mojica as Aunt Shadie. Miguel's production was the second time Mojica had played Aunt Shadie. Colleen Winton, Yolanda Bonnell, Columpa C. Bobb, Cheri Maracle, Nimikii Couchie-Waukey, Lisa Cromarty, Pierre Brault, Olivier Lamarche, Jenifer Brousseau, Soni Moreno, and Kelsey Wavey also appeared in the show.

== See also ==
- Unnatural & Accidental, a 2006 film adaptation
