= Spiderwoman Theater =

NYC-based indigenous women's theater troupe

- Formation: 1976
- Type: Theatre group
- Location: Brooklyn, New York
- Artistic director: Muriel Miguel
- Website: www.spiderwomantheater.org

Spiderwoman Theater is an Indigenous women's performance troupe that blends traditional art forms with Western theater. Named after Spider Grandmother from Hopi mythology, it is the longest running Indigenous theatre company in the United States.

Founded in 1976, Spiderwoman theater began as an early feminist theatre group, of both Indigenous and non-Indigenous women in New York City. As part of the feminist movement of the 1970s, their work questioned gender roles, cultural stereotypes, sexual and economic oppression. The current core group consists of sisters Muriel Miguel, Gloria Miguel, and Lisa Mayo. It is the first Native American women's theater troupe to gain international recognition.

== History ==
Spiderwoman Theater was founded in 1976, as a mixed group of Indigenous and non-Indigenous women, with a focus on producing work about general feminist issues.

Spiderwoman Theater was founded in 1976, when Muriel Miguel gathered together a diverse company of women which included both of her sisters. They were of varying ages, races, sexual orientation, and worldview. The collective sprang out of the feminist movement of the 1970s and the disillusionment with the treatment of women in radical political movements of the time.

— spiderwoman.org "about us"

Muriel Miguel developed a piece with Lois Weaver based on three stories of the Hopi goddess Spiderwoman teaching people how to weave. Weaver calls the signature Spiderwoman approach to performance creation, which they developed as a collective, storyweaving, saying it combines improvisational techniques from the Open Theatre, the Hopi goddess of creation's lessons on weaving, movement, and personal stories.

The group premiered their first work, Women in Violence, at Washington Square Methodist Church. The play combined the actors' personal stories of facing violence, contrasting serious subject matter with slapstick and sexual humor. For the piece they created a simple lighting design and a backdrop made out of Native American quilts. They toured the play in the United States and Europe. At a theatre in Nancy, France, the women refused to sweep their performance space before their show. Hecklers gathered at the performance, upset that a male producer had to sweep the floor. Organizers of a later performance in Bologna, Italy cancelled it for fear of riots. They debuted their second play, The Lysistrata Numbah!, in 1977. The production melded Aristophanes' Lysistrata with group members' stories.

In 1978, the troupe performed in Europe. In Berlin, their luggage was lost in transit, and they had to borrow performance costumes from the performers in fellow New Yorker Jimmy Camicia's troupe Hot Peaches. As the troupe was mostly made up of drag queens, this caused some mixed reactions in the group. At the performance, they met one of only three women in Hot Peaches, Peggy Shaw who later joined Spiderwomen.

Schisms developed in the collective that led to group splitting in two in 1981. The offshoot, non-Indigenous, lesbian performance troupe Split Britches included Lois Weaver, Peggy Shaw, and Deb Margolin.

Spiderwoman Theater continued on with the three sisters and shifted its focus to Indigenous issues that year with the play Sun, Moon and Feather. Their Winnetou's Snake Oil Show from Wigwam City is a satire of the European and particularly German fascination with Native Americans. The play parodies the characters of dime-store novelist Karl May, New Ageism, and non-Natives who pretend to be Native American. The play includes a phony shaman workshop where white people are transformed into Indians for a weekend for $3000. According to the troupe, it was an act of resistance meant to reclaim their identity as Indigenous women. After Winnetou's Snake Oil Show, the sisters had enough remaining material that they produced an additional show on the theme, Reverb-ber-ber-rations.

Performance Documentation of the pieces "Women In Violence" (1976) and "Lysistrata Numbah!" (1977) were included in the WACK! Art and Feminist Revolution Exhibition, organized by Cornelia Butler and presented at The Museum of Contemporary Art, Los Angeles, March 4 – July 16, 2007. Additionally, Spiderwoman founder Muriel Miguel was the subject about a short documentary by Theatre Communications Group in a series about theatre companies about people of color.

In 1997, a repository for Spiderwoman Theater, the Native American Women Playwrights Archive (NAWPA), was created. It contains promotional and personal documents associated with the theater troupe and also holds a collection of manuscripts and related items pertaining to Native American women in theater.

Over the years, Spiderwoman Theater has been honored with various accolades. In 1997, the Native American Women Playwrights Archive at Miami University in Oxford, Ohio recognized their life's work by awarding them with Honorary Doctorates of Fine Arts. In 2005, the Smithsonian Institution's National Museum of the American Indian in New York City paid tribute to Spiderwoman Theater by including them as a part of an exhibit called "New Tribe, New York." In 2010, the Women's Caucus for Art honored them with a Lifetime Achievement Award.

== Founders ==
Spiderwoman Theater was founded by sisters Muriel Miguel, Gloria Miguel and Lisa Mayo (born Elizabeth Miguel). They are of Guna and Rappahannock ancestry and were born and grew up in Brooklyn, New York. The sisters' mother and maternal grandmother also grew up in Brooklyn, but their father, a Guna Indian, was born in the San Blas Islands near Panama. According to Muriel, their father struggled to provide for his family via conventional means, and so the family would perform dances and snake oil shows for money. The three sisters were embarrassed by these performances and decided they would rather associate with more professional types of theater as opposed to being "spectacles of cliché."

Muriel Miguel is a founder of the Native American Theatre Ensemble at La MaMa. She is a choreographer, play writer, actor, educator, and Two-spirit woman. She gathered a diverse group of women including both of her sisters Gloria Miguel and Lisa Mayo, thus creating the Spiderwoman theater. She also taught theater at Bard College. In addition to Spiderwoman Theater, she was a founding member of Joseph Chaikin's Open Theater.

Gloria Miguel studied drama at Oberlin College. She has worked extensively in television and theater with the Spiderwoman, she has toured throughout New Zealand, Australia and Europe. She was a drama consultant for the Minnesota Native American AIDS, she was also a drama teacher at the YMCA eastern district in Brooklyn. she is also the mother of Monique Mojica, another playwright and actress.

Lisa Mayo (1924–2013) was trained as a mezzo-soprano at the New York School of Music. Mayo also studied dance and musical comedy. She has written and performed in more than 20 plays that were produced by The Spiderwoman Theater, and toured New Zealand, Europe, Australia, China, United States and throughout Canada. She has created two one-woman shows The Pause That Refreshes and My Sister Ate Dirt. Mayo contributed to the Minnesota Native American AIDS by teaching theater crafts to young people. She served on the board of directors of The American Indian Community House from 1998 to 2007.

== Works ==
Of the many plays by Spiderwoman Theatre, the following plays have been printed in anthologies:

- "Sun, Moon, and Feather" in Contemporary Plays by Women of Color: An Anthology. Kathy A. Perkins and Roberta Uno, editors (London: Routledge, 1996. Republished in 2006).
- "Power Pipes" in Seventh Generation: An Anthology of Native American Plays. Mimi D'Aponte, editor, (New York: Theatre Communications Group, June 1998).
- "Winnetous Snake Oil Show from Wigwam City" in Playwrights of Color. Meg Swanson and Robin Murray, editors, (Nicholas Brealey Publishing, Aug. 1999).
- "Sun, Moon, and Feather" in Stories of Our Way: An Anthology of American Indian Plays. Jaye T. Darby and Hanay Geiogamah, editors, (UCLA American Indian Studies Center: Jan. 2000).
- "Reverb-ber-ber-rations" in Staging Coyote's Dream: An Anthology of First Nation Drama in English. Monique Mojica and Ric Knowles, editors (Playwrights Canada Press: Sept. 2002).
- "Winnetou's Snake Oil Show from Wigwam City" in Keepers of the Morning Star: An Anthology of Native Women's Theater. Jaye T. Darby and Stephanie Fitzgerald, editors (UCLA American Indian Studies Center: Jan. 2003).
- "Winnetous Snake Oil Show from Wigwam City" in Footpaths & Bridges: Voices from the Native American Women Playwrights Archive. Shirley A. Huston Findley and Rebecca Howard, editors (University of Michigan Press: 2009)
- "Trail of the Otter" in Staging Coyote's Dream: An Anthology of First Nation Drama in English, Volume 2. Monique Mojica and Ric Knowles, editors (Playwrights Canada Press: Sept. 2009).
- "Hot 'n' Soft" in Two Spirit Acts: Queer Indigenous Performances. Jean O'Hara, editor (Playwrights Canada Press: April 2014).

Other works include:

- "Red Mother," a one-woman play produced for 2 nights at the Museum of the American Indian.
- "Persistence of Memory," a play about the healing aspects of story-telling as well as stereotypes surrounding Indigenous expressions and the challenges Indigenous performers face as a result.
- Women in Violence 1977
- Lysistrata Numbah! 1977
- The Trilogy of: My Sister Ate Dirt, Jealousy and Friday Night 1978
- Cabaret: An Evening of Disgusting Songs and Pukey Images 1979
- Oh, What a Life 1980
- The Fittin' Room 1980
- Material Witness, 2016
- Fear of Oatmeal, 2018: The day after "Fear of Oatmeal" closed, Muriel Miguel was named a recipient of a Doris Duke Performing Artist Award of $275,000.
- Town of Little Sagas, a podcast series following the everyday inhabitants of an imaginary Native town, which premiered May 3, 2021.
- Misdemeanor Dream, 2022
