= Unnatural & Accidental =

- Directed by: Carl Bessai
- Written by: Marie Clements
- Based on: The Unnatural and Accidental Women by Marie Clements
- Produced by: Emily Alden (co-producer); Carl Bessai (producer); Cynthia Chapman (line producer); Jason James (producer)
- Starring: Carmen Moore; Callum Keith Rennie; Tantoo Cardinal
- Cinematography: Carl Bessai
- Edited by: Julian Clarke
- Music by: Clinton Shorter
- Distributed by: Odeon Films
- Release date: February 14, 2006
- Running time: 90 minutes
- Country: Canada
- Language: English
- Box office: $5,420

Unnatural & Accidental is a 2006 Canadian film directed by Carl Bessai and starring Carmen Moore, Callum Keith Rennie, and Tantoo Cardinal. It was adapted from a Marie Clements play The Unnatural and Accidental Women.

== Premise ==
Unnatural & Accidental is about a First Nations woman named Rebecca (Carmen Moore) who returns home to Vancouver to be with her dying father and searches for her mother, Rita Jones (Tantoo Cardinal), who has been missing for years. Her journey leads her into the troubled life faced by many First Nations women who have ended up killed.

== Awards ==
=== 2007 ===
- Genie Award for Best Achievement in Music – Original Song – Jennifer Kreisberg, song "Have Hope"
- Leo Award for Best Lead Performance by a Male in a Feature Length Drama – Callum Keith Rennie
- Leo Award for Best Picture Editing in a Feature Length Drama – Julian Clarke
- Leo Award for Best Supporting Performance by a Female in a Feature Length Drama – Margo Kane

=== 2006 ===
- Vancouver International Film Festival Best Western Canadian Feature Film – Special Citation – Carl Bessai
- Vancouver International Film Festival Women in Film Award – Carmen Moore

== See also ==
- The Ecstasy of Rita Joe, George Ryga
