= Centre for Indigenous Theatre =

Ontarian non-profit theater educational institution

Coordinates: 43.64792°N 79.39478°W

- Abbreviation: CIT
- Formation: 1974
- Location: Toronto, Ontario
- Staff: Celeste Sansregret (managing director), Rose C. Stella (Artistic Director)
- Website: indigenoustheatre.com
- Formerly called: Native Theatre School (1974–1994)

The Centre for Indigenous Theatre is a non-profit theater educational institution located in Toronto, Ontario. It focuses on performance art from an Indigenous cultural foundation.

The goal of the Centre "is to develop and implement educational programs that promote and foster an understanding of Indigenous Theatre while providing the highest caliber arts training to Indigenous students from across Canada."

== History ==
James H. Buller founded the Centre in 1974 as the Native Theatre School with the Association for Native Development in the Performing and Visual Arts. Buller was a noted opera and musical comedy singer.

Before founding the school, Buller served in the Royal Canadian Navy and competed as a popular boxer known as "Gentleman Jim". He wanted to see Aboriginal actors, playwrights and directors flourish across Canada and create a network of Aboriginal theatre companies.

The school changed its name to the Centre for Indigenous Theatre in 1994. The Centre first offered a one-year program, which was later expanded to a two-year program. By 1998, the program offered an additional, optional third year.

== Funding ==
All levels of government fund the Centre. The Miziwe Biik Aboriginal Management Board, The McLean Foundation, Molson Companies Donation Fund and the Toronto Blue Jays also provide monetary support to the Centre.

== Notable people ==
=== Notable students ===
Students must be over the age of eighteen and of Aboriginal descent.

- Gary Farmer – 1974
- Graham Greene – 1974
- Billy Merasty – 1984
- Tina Louise Bomberry – 1988
- Jennifer Podemski – 1992
- George Leach – 1996
- Lucie Idlout – 1997

=== Notable faculty ===
- Columpa Bobb
- Margo Kane
- Jani Lauzon
- David Ley
- Lee Maracle – cultural director 1998–2000
- Muriel Miguel
- Daniel David Moses
- Drew Hayden Taylor
- Paul Thompson
- John Turner (Mump and Smoot)
- Tomson Highway
- David Calderisi
- August Schellenberg

== James Buller Awards for Aboriginal Theatre Excellence ==
The award, established in 1995, "recognizes the work of Aboriginal people in the arts".
