= Marie Clements =

Canadian writer

- Born: Marie Humber Clements; January 10, 1962 (age 64); Vancouver, British Columbia, Canada
- Education: Mount Royal College
- Occupations: Actor, writer, director

Marie Clements (born January 10, 1962) is a Canadian Métis playwright, performer, director, producer and screenwriter. She was the founding artistic director of Urban Ink Productions, and is currently co-artistic director of Red Diva Projects, and director of her new film company Working Pajama Lab Entertainment. Clements lives on Galiano Island, British Columbia. As a writer she has worked in a variety of media including theatre, performance, film, multi-media, radio and television.

== Early life ==
Clements was born in Vancouver, British Columbia. Early in her life she studied dance, speech, singing, piano and music, but she dreamed of being a foreign correspondent. She studied journalism at Mount Royal College in Calgary, Alberta.

== Career ==
During the 1980s, Clements worked as a radio news reporter and is still a freelance contributor to CBC radio. She has also worked in the writing department of the television series Da Vinci's Inquest which had a plot line similar to The Unnatural and Accidental Women which is based on the murders of several Indigenous women in Vancouver's Skid Row district.

She has been a playwright in residence at the National Theatre School of Canada, the Banff Centre for the Arts, the Firehall Arts Centre and the National Arts Centre. She has been writer-in-residence at several Canadian universities, including Simon Fraser University and University of British Columbia

Theatre Research in Canada dedicated a special issue of the journal to the celebration of Clements's contribution to Canadian theatre.

In 2010, Clements founded Working Pajama Lab, which specializes in the development, creation and strategic weaving of story across film, TV, digital media and live performance. She also founded Red Diva Project the same year when she was commissioned to create the Aboriginal Pavilion's closing performance at the 2010 Winter Olympics in Vancouver.

Clements's plays often consider several overlapping themes, such as the themes of racism, sexism and violence explored in The Unnatural and Accidental Women. Her theatrical style is a blending of Aboriginal storytelling, ritual and western theatrical conventions. As a playwright, director and dramaturge, she "explores important issues of women, aboriginals, and the realities of the urban core in innovative, highly theatrical stagings".

While touring the Canadian north, Clements wrote her first play, Age of Iron (1993). She says it was "sheer cold boredom and a serious desire to understand and integrate the elemental connections between Greek mythology and Native thought" that inspired her to write it.

Clements's plays often "reframe...authorized Western histories" to encourage spectators acknowledgement of alternative histories and critically engage with the process of historiography. Both Burning Vision (staged by Tom Bentley-Fisher for The Barcelona International Grec Festival) and The Unnatural and Accidental Women engage with elements of Canadian history that are pushed to the periphery and press issues of "counter-hegemonic remembrance practices".

Her importance as a Canadian playwright is reflected in the number of award nominations, the numerous translations of her works and the number of scholarly articles dedicated to her plays.

In 2025 she entered production on her latest film, under the working title Tombs. Under the release title How We Stand, it is slated to premiere in the Centrepiece program at the 2026 Toronto International Film Festival.

== Awards and honours ==
=== Awards and fellowships ===
- 1996: Fellowship from the Minneapolis Playwrights' Center for Now Look What You Made Me Do.
- 1998: Jessie Richardson Theatre Award, P.T.C. Award for Outstanding Original Play in Development, for The Unnatural and Accidental Women.
- 2004: Canada–Japan Literary Award, English-language category, for Burning Vision.
- 2024: Matt Cohen Award from the Writers' Trust of Canada for her body of work.

=== Recognition ===
- 2010: Theatre Research in Canada published a special issue examining her work.

=== Nominations and shortlistings ===
==== Theatre awards ====
- 1993: Nominated for the Jessie Richardson Theatre Award for Outstanding Original Play for Age of Iron.
- 1994: Nominated for the Jessie Richardson Theatre Awards for Outstanding Ensemble Creation and Outstanding Ensemble Performance for Wet Dreams.
- 1994: Nominated for the Sydney Risk Award at the Jessie Richardson Theatre Awards for Age of Iron.
- 2002: Nominated for the Jessie Richardson Theatre Award for Outstanding Original Play or Musical, small theatre category, for Burning Vision.
- 2002: Nominated for the Siminovitch Prize in Theatre.

==== Literary awards ====
- 2003: Finalist for the Governor General's Award for English-language drama for Burning Vision.
- 2004: Finalist for the George Ryga Award for Burning Vision.

==== Screenwriting competitions ====
- 1997: Shortlisted in the Praxis Screenwriting Competition for Now Look What You Made Me Do.
- 1998: Finalist in the Sundance Screenwriting Competition for Now Look What You Made Me Do.

== Writings and appearances ==
=== Plays ===
- Age of Iron (1993)
- Now Look What You Made Me Do (1997)
- The Girl Who Swam Forever (1997)
- The Unnatural and Accidental Women (2000)
- Burning Vision (2002)
- Copper Thunderbird (2007)
- The Edward Curtis Project : A Modern Picture Story (2010)
- Tombs of the Vanishing Indian (2012)
- Iron Peggy (2020)

=== Film ===
- Da Vinci's Inquest (2002), actor (Melanie Frum)
- Unnatural & Accidental (2006), screenwriter, actor (Native Bartender)
- Making History: Louis Riel and the North-West Rebellion of 1885
- The Road Forward (2017), writer/director
- Red Snow (2019)
- Bones of Crows (2022)
- Lay Down Your Heart (2022)
- How We Stand (2026)

=== Radio ===
- Vancouver Rose - ongoing CBC Radio Commentary 2002
- The Meter is Running - Sounds Like Canada, CBC Radio 2003
- Women in Fish Series - A four-part documentary, CBC Outfront 2005
- hours of water- radio drama - CBC Radio Drama 2005
- Tombs of the Vanishing Indian (in development)

=== Multi-media ===
- Urban Tattoo (1999)
- The Women in Fish Interactive Installation
- Hours of Water (2004)
- The Red Diva Project (2008)
- The Edward Curtis Project (2013)
- Missing (2017)
