= Schoolgirl =

Schoolgirl(s) or School Girl(s) may refer to:

== Film and theater ==
- School Girl (film), a 1971 American pornographic film
- Schoolgirls (film), a 2020 Spanish drama film
- The School Girl, a 1903 British stage musical by Leslie Stuart
- School Girls; Or, the African Mean Girls Play, a 2017 play by Jocelyn Bioh

== Other uses ==
- "Schoolgirl" (song), a 1986 song by Kim Wilde
- "School Girls", a 2017 song by L Devine
- The Schoolgirl, a 1920s–1940s British girls' story paper

== See also ==
- School Gyrls, an American pop quintet
- Schoolgirl uniform fetish
- Single-sex education
- Female education
- Student
