= Susannah Flood =

American theatre actress

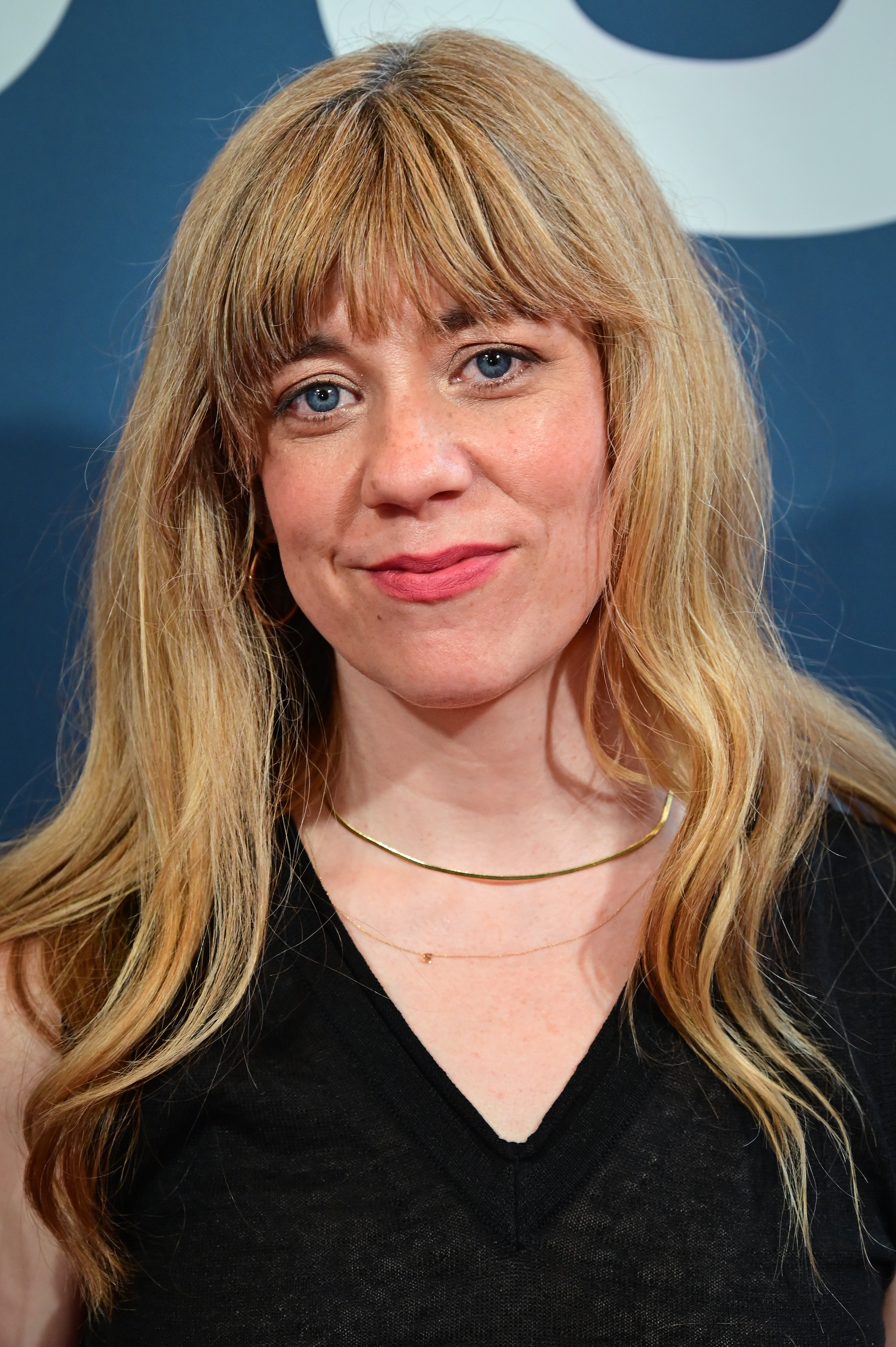
- Flood in 2026
- Born: June 30, 1982 (age 44); New York City, New York, U.S.
- Education: University of California, Berkeley (BA); Brown University (MFA)
- Occupation: Actress
- Years active: 2008-present

Susannah Winnifred Flood (born June 30, 1982) is an American actress known for her work in the theatre.

== Early life and education ==
Flood is the daughter of Peter Gosnell Flood, an acting teacher and lifetime member of the Actors Studio. Prior to his marriage to her mother, Virginia, he was married to musical theatre actress Betty Buckley from 1972 until 1979. Flood spent her early years in New York City and Los Angeles.

She studied English at the University of California, Berkeley and went on to earn a Master of Fine Arts in Acting from Brown University, graduating in 2007.

== Career ==
Flood is known for her work Off-Broadway, originating roles in new plays. In 2023, she originated the role of Caitlin in The Comeuppance by Branden Jacobs-Jenkins. In 2024, she played the role of Mina in Abe Koogler's Staff Meal.

She made her Broadway debut in 2016, playing the role of Dunyasha in The Cherry Orchard. In 2022, she returned to Broadway in the new play Birthday Candles, playing multiple roles. In 2025, Flood played the lead role of Lizzie in Liberation by Bess Wohl directed by Whitney White. Flood starred in the original Off-Broadway production from January 31, 2025, through March 30, 2025, continuing on to Broadway from October 8, 2025, until the play closed on February 1, 2026.

On television, she played Ann, the sister of Amy Schumer's character on Life & Beth and Kate Littlejohn in the television series For The People. On film, she played Dorothy in The Chronology of Water, directed by Kristen Stewart.

== Acting credits ==
=== Theater ===
Year	Title	Role	Venue	Ref.
2012	Tribes	Sylvia (replacement)	Off-Broadway, Barrow Street Theatre	
2013	Mr. Burns, a Post-Electric Play	Performer	Off-Broadway, Playwrights Horizons	
2014	Love and Information	Performer	Off-Broadway, New York Theatre Workshop	
2016	The Effect	Connie	Off-Broadway, Barrow Street Theatre	
2016	The Cherry Orchard	Dunyasha	Broadway, American Airlines Theatre	
2018	Nassim	Guest Performer	Off-Broadway, Barrow Street Theatre	
2019	Make Believe	Performer	Off-Broadway, Second Stage Theatre	
2022	Birthday Candles	Alice/ Madeline/ Ernie	Broadway, Todd Haimes Theatre	
2023	The Comeuppance	Caitlin	Off-Broadway, Signature Theatre Company	
2024	Staff Meal	Mina	Off-Broadway, Playwrights Horizons	
2024	The Counter	Katie	Off-Broadway, Laura Pels Theatre	
2025	Liberation	Lizzie	Off-Broadway, Laura Pels Theatre	
2025	Liberation	Lizzie	Broadway, James Earl Jones Theatre	

== Awards and nominations ==
Year	Award	Category	Work	Result	Ref.
2025	Lucille Lortel Award	Outstanding Lead Performer in a Play	Liberation	Nominated	
2025	Drama Desk Award	Ensemble Award	Liberation	Won	
2025	New York Drama Critics Circle	Best Ensemble	Liberation	Won	
2026	Drama League Award	Distinguished Performance	Liberation	Nominated	
2026	Tony Award	Best Performance by a Leading Actress in a Play	Liberation	Nominated	
