= MaameYaa Boafo =

Ghanaian-American actress

- Born: Pakistan
- Education: Hood College; Rutgers University 2009 Marc Bloch University
- Occupations: Actress, comedian
- Years active: 2012–present

MaameYaa Boafo (/ˈmɑːmiːjɑː ˈbwɑːfoʊ/ MAH-mee-yah BWAH-foh) is a Pakistan-born Ghanaian-American actress and comedian.

== Biography ==
Boafo was born in Pakistan. She is of Ashanti (Ghanaian) ethnicity. She was raised in Sudan, Ethiopia, Switzerland, and Kenya, but is a citizen of Ghana. In 2001, after graduating from high school, Boafo travelled to the United States to study French and communication.

After graduating from Hood College in 2005, she received a scholarship to study acting at Rutgers University and earned her master's degree in 2009. Boafo did a study abroad semester at Marc Bloch University in Strasbourg, France.

Boafo made her acting debut as Asa in the 2012 short film Asa, A Beautiful Girl. In 2014, Boafo began portraying Nana Yaa in Nicole Amarteifio's web TV series An African City. Her character is a journalist who struggles to afford rent in Accra, analogous to Carrie Bradshaw in Sex and the City. Boafo noticed the role on a Facebook page, and because she was travelling she sent a videotaped audition to Amarteifio, who called a week later.

In 2014, she starred in Bus Nut, an experimental short film in which she read the words from the trial of Rosa Parks. It premiered at the San Francisco Film Festival.

In 2015, Boafo had a small role in The Family Fang. She appeared in the short films New York, I Love You and Olive in 2016. From 2017 to 2018, she starred as Paulina in the play School Girls; Or, the African Mean Girls Play, which was inspired by Mean Girls.

Boafo was nominated for the Lucille Lortel Award and the Los Angeles Drama Circle Award for best actor, was nominated for a Drama League Award and won a Drama Desk Award for her performance. She played HIV patient Abena Kwemo in a 2018 episode of Chicago Med. In 2019, she played private investigator Briana Logan in the TV series Bluff City Law. Boafo portrayed Zainab in the TV series Ramy in 2020.

Boafo made a video in reaction to the death of Freddie Gray in Baltimore titled "As Nina", as she reportedly bears a resemblance to the late singer Nina Simone. In addition to English, she speaks Twi.

== Filmography ==
=== Film ===
Year	Title	Role	Notes
2012	Asa, A Beautiful Girl	Asa Kolawole	Short film
2012	Tied & True	Roda	Short film
2012	Azure II		Short film
2014	When It All Falls Down...	Dominique	Short film
2014	Bus Nut		Short film
2015	The Family Fang	College student	
2016	New York, I Love You	Viviane	Short film
2016	Olive	Ava Nuyame	Short film
2017	Where Is Kyra?	Casey	
2017	The Blue Car	Mother	Short film
2017	Ibrahim	Aminata	Short film

=== Television ===
Year	Title	Role	Notes
2013–2018	Thru 25	Cassie	10 episodes
2014	Madam Secretary	Komoyo	Episode: "The Call"
2014	An African City	Nana Yaa	Main cast
2014–2015	Deadstar	Charice	2 episodes
2015	American Odyssey	Desk clerk	Episode: "Bug Out"
2015	The Blacklist	Lucinda	Episode: "Marvin Gerard (No. 80)"
2015	The Mysteries of Laura	Kimmie	Episode: "The Mystery of the Maternal Instinct"
2016	Conversating While Black	Renee	TV Pilot
2016	Beyond Complicated	Camilla	Episode: "As Told By Her 103"
2017	Iron Fist	Female receptionist	Episode: "Snow Gives Way"
2018	Chicago Med	Abena Kwemo	Episode: "Mountains and Molehills"
2019	Theater Close Up	Paulina	Episode: "School Girls; Or, the African Mean Girls Play"
2019	Bluff City Law	Briana Johnson	Main cast
2020	Ramy	Zainab	Recurring (season 2)
2021–2022	The Mysterious Benedict Society	Rhonda Kazembe	Main cast
2023	Extrapolations	Lucy Adobo	Episode: "2070: Ecocide"

== Awards and nominations ==
Year	Award	Category	Work	Result	Ref.
2018	Drama Desk Award	Ensemble Award	School Girls; Or, the African Mean Girls Play	Won	
2018	Drama League Award	Distinguished Performance	School Girls; Or, the African Mean Girls Play	Nominated	
2018	Outer Critics Circle Award	Outstanding Actress in a Play	School Girls; Or, the African Mean Girls Play	Nominated	
2018	Lucille Lortel Award	Outstanding Lead Actress in a Play	School Girls; Or, the African Mean Girls Play	Nominated	
2019	Los Angeles Drama Critics Circle Award	Lead Performance	School Girls; Or, the African Mean Girls Play	Won	
