= An African City =

2014 Ghanaian TV and web series

- Genre: Romantic comedy Sitcom
- Created by: Nicole Amarteifio
- Starring: MaameYaa Boafo; Nana Mensah; Maame Adjei; Marie Humbert; Esosa E
- Country of origin: Ghana
- Original language: English
- No. of seasons: 2
- No. of episodes: 23

Production
- Executive producers: Nicole Amarteifio; Millie Monyo

Original release
- Network: YouTube
- Release: March 2, 2014 – present

An African City is a television and a web series, which was created as a Ghanaian equivalent of Sex and the City for YouTube. The first episode of the webseries debuted on March 2, 2014. The second season debuted on January 24, 2016. The series follows the lives of five single young women of African descent who have recently resettled in Accra, Ghana, after living abroad for most of their lives. The series also displays how each woman balance being a successful college-educated woman with their personal lives as well as their new life as "returnees" in Ghana. Each episode is told in first-person narrative through the main character NanaYaa and touches on a wide array of subjects from power outages or skin whitening to condom use, self-gratification and sexual abstinence before marriage.

== History ==
Nicole Amarteifio, the creator and executive producer of the webseries, was inspired to create the series based upon her life as she was born in Ghana but raised abroad. Upon her official return to Ghana, she wanted to tell the story of women returning to the country, as well as help change the face of the African woman within mainstream society. Inspired by Issa Rae of the webseries Awkward Black Girl, Amarteifio made the series a webseries because she felt that her ideas would be changed and it wouldn't be the story she was trying to tell had she made it a television series. However, she based the series off of Sex and the City because she believed that Sex and the City gave American women confidence, and she wanted to do the same for women across the African continent.

== Characters ==
- NanaYaa was born in Ghana and raised in the suburbs of New York City. After living alone in Manhattan following her family's return to Ghana, NanaYaa returned as a journalist and works as a talk show host at one of Ghana's top radio stations. While living in New York, NanaYaa previously dated Segun, a Nigerian-British man who moved to Accra shortly after their break up. Although the two are still in love with each other, NanaYaa begins to date Fidel Roberto, a wealthy Angolan man. Because NanaYaa is the main character, the series typically revolves around NanaYaa's struggle to make it in Ghana, as well as her imperfect love life. NanaYaa is portrayed by Ghanaian actress MaameYaa Boafo.
- Ṣadé was born and raised in Houston, Texas, to a Nigerian pastor and his Ghanaian wife. A graduate of Harvard Business School, Sade returned to Ghana after living most of her professional life in Boston. The marketing manager of a prominent Nigerian bank in Accra, Sade has a way of getting what she wants through dating wealthy men much older than she. Sade is known for playing hard to get, as well as being promiscuous and for being spoiled by her many suitors. She is also very irreligious. Because of her promiscuous and liberal sexual attitude, Sade often clashes with Ngozi who is a devout Christian. Sade is portrayed by Ghanaian-American actress Nana Mensah.
- Zainab was born in Sierra Leone and raised in Atlanta, Georgia. An entrepreneur, Zainab is known for being committed to her work which was what brought the young businesswoman to Ghana. She exports shea butter to the United States, as well as helping impoverished women in the Northern Region of Ghana. Because she is involved in her work, Zainab has little time for her love life although she has had several potential lovers through the series. Zainab is portrayed by Ghanaian-American actress Maame Adjei.
- Makena was born in Kenya and raised in London, England. The daughter of an English father and a Ghanaian mother, Makena is a graduate from the University of Oxford's Faculty of Law. After a divorce and a successful law career in London, Makena returned to Ghana both single and jobless. She has been staying with relatives since her move to Accra and hasn't been able to find much work since. Makena also left a romantic interest back in London. She has a smoking habit, and is sometimes seen smoking cigarettes. Makena is portrayed by Ghanaian-Australian actress Marie Humbert.
- Ngozi was born and raised in Silver Spring, Maryland, to Nigerian parents. After earning a graduate degree in international affairs, Ngozi moved to Accra after she was offered a job at a development agency. A devout Christian, Ngozi is celibate and vows to not have sex until she is married. Due to her strong Christian beliefs, she often clashes with Sade, who is entirely irreligious. Ngozi is portrayed by Nigerian-American actress Esosa E.
