= Aleshea Harris =

American filmmaker and playwright

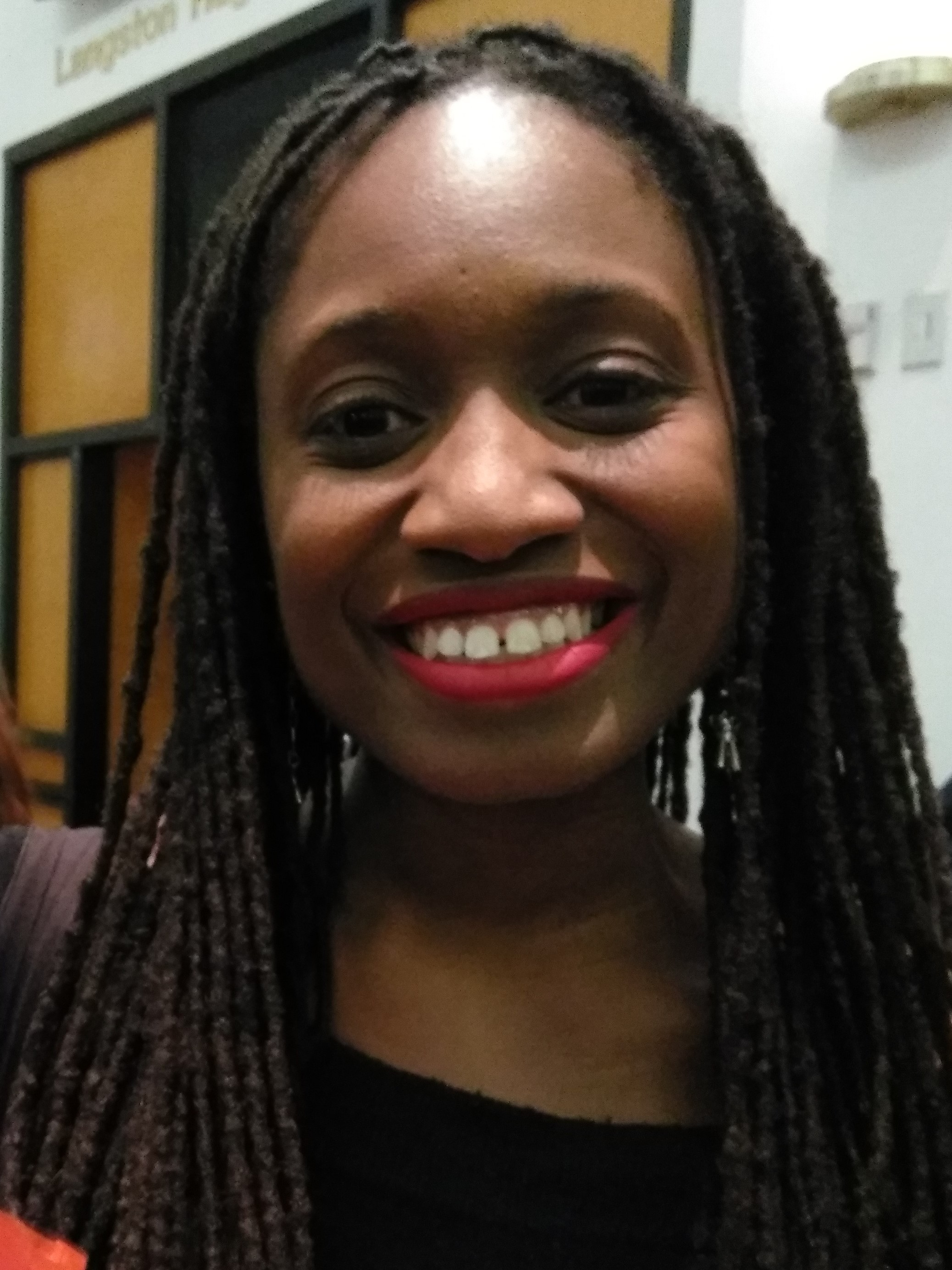
- Harris in 2018
- Born: Germany
- Education: University of Southern Mississippi (BA); California Institute of the Arts (MFA)
- Occupations: Playwright, screenwriter, filmmaker
- Writing career
- Language: English
- Genres: Theatre, film
- Notable works: Is God Is, What to Send Up When It Goes Down, On Sugarland
- Website: www.bagofbeans.net

Aleshea Harris is an American playwright, filmmaker, and screenwriter. Her play Is God Is won the American Playwriting Foundation's Relentless Award in 2016 and was adapted into a film—which she directed—in 2026. In 2023, her play On Sugarland was a finalist for the Pulitzer Prize for Drama.

Her work has been commissioned for the Denver Center for the Performing Arts. Her plays have toured in France and in Belgium and have been presented at Playfest at the Orlando Shakespeare Theater, the Edinburgh Festival Fringe, the Harriet Tubman Center for Social Justice, California Institute of the Arts, VOXfest at Dartmouth College in New Hampshire, and the Comédie de Saint-Étienne-National Drama Center in France.

== Early life ==
Harris was born in Germany and raised as a U.S. Army child. She spent her youth in many places, including Germany and in the South, notably Mississippi. She was born to an African-American father and Trinidad-born mother.

Harris is a CalArts alumna. She was a part of CalArts' student organization, a collective that collaborated with the American Conservatory Theater in San Francisco and with the African-American Shakespeare Company, with three plays and two staged readings.

== Career ==
Harris's work appeared in the anthology The BreakBeat Poets: New American Poetry in the Age of Hip-Hop, published in 2015.

In 2016 she directed her ritual play What to Send Up When it Goes Down at Occidental College in Los Angeles. What to Send Up When it Goes Down incorporates song, language (spoken word), and audience participation to honor black bodies and lives. It is described as a play/pageant/ritual about the death of black people due to racial violence.

In 2018, What to Send Up When It Goes Down was produced off-Broadway by The Movement Theatre Company in a Drama Desk-nominated, extended production. That production later traveled to the American Repertory Theatre in Cambridge, Woolly Mammoth Theatre Company in Washington D.C., The Public Theater in New York for the Under the Radar Festival, and at Playwrights Horizons and Brooklyn Academy of Music in New York.

In 2018, Is God Is, written by Harris and directed by Taibi Magar, premiered at Soho Rep in New York City and ran from February 6 to March 11. Is God Is received 3 Obie Awards for Playwriting, Directing, and Performance. The play won the American Playwriting Foundation's Relentless Award in 2016.

Her play On Sugarland was produced by the New York Theatre Workshop in 2022, directed by Whitney White and choreographed by Raja Feather Kelly. It was a finalist for the 2023 Pulitzer Prize for Drama.

A film adaptation of Is God Is, written, produced and directed by Harris for distribution by Orion Pictures, began filming in 2024 and was released in 2026 to critical acclaim.

== Awards ==
In addition to the Relentless Award in 2016, Harris has been a two-time finalist for the Susan Smith Blackburn Prize and a two-time MacDowell Fellow.

In 2019, Harris received the Helen Merrill Award for playwriting.

In 2020, Harris was awarded one of the eight Windham-Campbell Literature Prizes.
