= Hull-Warriner Award =

The Hull-Warriner Award is an award bestowed by the Dramatists Guild of America. The award is unique in that it is given by dramatists to dramatists. It is presented annually by the Dramatists Guild Council to an author, or team of authors, in recognition of their work dealing with difficult subjects including political, religious, and social mores of the times. The award is named in honor of the late Broadway performer Kate Warriner (1914—1960) and her partner, director Elizabeth Hull.

== Awardees ==
- 2023 Samuel D. Hunter A Case for the Existence of God and Sanaz Toossi English
- 2022 Martyna Majok Sanctuary City
- 2021 No Writer Awarded
- 2020 No Writer Awarded
- 2019 Michael R. Jackson A Strange Loop
- 2018 Heidi Schreck What the Constitution Means to Me
- 2017 Jocelyn Bioh School Girls; Or, the African Mean Girls Play
- 2016 Paula Vogel Indecent
- 2015 Lin-Manuel Miranda Hamilton
- 2014 Stephen Adly Guirgis Between Riverside and Crazy
- 2013 Annie Baker The Flick
- 2012 Christopher Durang Vanya and Sonia and Masha and Spike
- 2011 Stephen Karam Sons of the Prophet and John Kander & David Thompson The Scottsboro Boys
- 2010 Bruce Norris Clybourne Park
- 2009 Lynn Nottage Ruined
- 2008 David Ives New Jerusalem
- 2007: Tracy Letts August: Osage County
- 2006: Steven Sater & Duncan Sheik Spring Awakening
- 2005: Adam Guettel & Craig Lucas The Light In The Piazza
- 2004: John Patrick Shanley Doube
- 2003: Doug Wright I Am My Own Wife
- 2002: Dael Orlandersmith Yellowman
- 2001: Tony Kushner Homebody/Kabul
- 2000: David Auburn Proof
- 1999: Donald Margulies Dinner With Friends
- 1998: Margaret Edson Wit
- 1997: Paula Vogel How I Learned To Drive
- 1996: August Wilson Seven Guitars
- 1995: Emily Mann Having Our Say
- 1994: Edward Albee Three Tall Women
- 1993: Tony Kushner Angels in America
- 1992 Larry Kramer The Destiny Of Me, John Leguizamo Spic-O-Rama and Donald Margulies Sight Unseen
- 1991 Scott McPherson Marvin's Room
- 1990 John Guare Six Degrees of Separation
- 1989 Terrence McNally The Lisbon Traviata
- 1988 Wendy Wasserstein The Heidi Chronicles
- 1987 Terrence McNally Frankie and Johnny in the Clair de Lune
- 1986 George C. Wolfe The Colored Museum
- 1985 Christopher Durang The Marriage Of Bette And Boo
- 1984 David Mamet Glengarry Glen Ross
- 1983 Marsha Norman 'night mother
- 1982 Harvey Fierstein Torch Song Trilogy
- 1981 Shirley Lauro Open Admissions
- 1980 Martin Sherman Bent
- 1979 Stephen Sondheim & Hugh Wheeler Sweeney Todd
- 1978 John Guare Landscape Of The Body
- 1977 Ronald Ribman Cold Storage
- 1976 Edward Albee Seascape
- 1975 Miguel Piñero Short Eyes
- 1974 Terrence McNally Bad Habits
- 1973 Joseph A. Walker The River Niger
- 1972 Philip Hayes Dean The Sty Of The Blind Pig
- 1971 David Rabe The Basic Training Of Pavlo Hummel & Streamers
