= Dede Ayite =

21st century costume designer

- Born: Ghana
- Education: Lehigh University (BS); Yale University (MFA)
- Awards: Tony Award for Best Costume Design of a Play (2024)

Dede Ayite is a Ghanaian-American costume designer. She won the 2024 Tony Award for Best Costume Design of a Play for her work on Jaja's African Hair Braiding, and has received 5 other Tony nominations for costume design. She is best known for her work costuming the Broadway productions of Buena Vista Social Club, Slave Play, A Soldier's Play, Hell's Kitchen, and Jaja's African Hair Braiding.

== Early life and education ==
Ayite grew up in Ghana in West Africa. In 2001, she moved to live with her mother in Silver Spring, Maryland, where she finished high school.

Interested in pursuing her dual interests in science and the arts, Ayite attended Lehigh University, where she studied theater and behavioral neuroscience. After graduating in 2007, Ayite apprenticed at Lehigh for a year managing their scene shop. After, she apprenticed at the Santa Fe Opera in New Mexico. She studied scenic design at the Yale School of Drama, where she earned a Master of Fine Arts degree.

== Career ==
In 2020, Ayite designed costumes for Slave Play and A Soldier's Play, receiving her first two Tony nominations for costume design. For A Soldier's Play, Ayite carefully crafted dog tags for each character with their name, age, and religious affiliation, giving the actors something to hold as they got into character. Later that year, while live theater was on hiatus due to the COVID-19 pandemic, Ayite formed Design Action with fellow designers. Design Action worked to address racism in the theater community and support incoming designers of color.

In 2022, Ayite earned a special Drama Desk Award for having "costumed half the actors of this theatre season with her designs for “Merry Wives,” “Seven Deadly Sins,” “The Last of the Love Letters,” “Chicken and Biscuits,” “Slave Play,” “Nollywood Dreams,” “American Buffalo,” and “How I Learned to Drive,” demonstrating a knack for conveying characters' means, values, and aspirations before the actors utter a word."

In 2023, she designed costumes for the Off-Broadway and later Broadway productions of Buena Vista Social Club, earning a Tony nomination for the latter. The following year, she designed the costumes for Alicia Keys' jukebox musical Hells Kitchen, drawing inspiration from 90's street fashion. This also earned her a Tony nomination. She won the 2024 Tony Award for Best Costume Design of a Play for her work on Jaja's African Hair Braiding. This made her the first Black woman to win a Tony Award in this category.

In 2025, she designed costumes for Broadway's Othello starring Denzel Washington and Jake Gyllenhaal. Her work was praised for its modernized depiction of a historic play and for its well-researched military accuracy.

== Theatre credits ==
Broadway

- Lady Day at Emerson's Bar & Grill (2014) - Assistant Costume Design
- The Gin Game (2015) - Associate Costume Design
- In Transit (2016) - Associate Costume Design
- Children of a Lesser God (2018) - Costume Design
- American Son (2018) - Costume Design
- Slave Play (2019, 2021) - Costume Design
- A Soldier's Play (2019) - Costume Design
- Chicken & Biscuits (2021) - Costume Design
- American Buffalo (2022) - Costume Design
- How I Learned to Drive (2022) - Costume Design
- Topdog/Underdog (2022) - Costume Design
- Ohio State Murders (2022) - Costume Design
- Jaja's African Hair Braiding (2023) - Costume Design
- Appropriate (2023) - Costume Design
- Days of Wine and Roses (2024) - Costume Design
- Hell's Kitchen (2024) - Costume Design
- Home (2024) Costume Design
- Our Town (2024) - Costume Design
- Purpose (2025) - Costume Design
- Buena Vista Social Club (2025) - Costume Design
- Othello (2025) - Costume Design
- The Last Five Years (2025) - Costume Design
- Proof (2026) - Costume Design

Select Off-Broadway and Regional

- Ugly Lies the Bone (2015, Roundabout)
- The Last Tiger in Haiti (2016, La Jolla Playhouse, Berkeley Rep)
- Bella: An American Tall Tale (2017, Playwrights Horizon)
- BLKS (2017, Steppenwolf)
- Jesus Hopped the 'A' Train (2017, Signature)
- Slave Play (2018, NYTW)
- School Girls; Or, the African Mean Girls Play (2018, MCC)
- Secret Life of Bees (2019, Atlantic)
- By the Way, Meet Vera Stark (2019, Signature)

== Awards ==
=== Outer Critics Circle Awards ===
Year	Category	Nominated work	Result	Ref.
2023	Outstanding Costume Design	Topdog/Underdog	Nominated	
2024	Outstanding Costume Design	Jaja's African Hair Braiding	Nominated	
2026	Outstanding Costume Design	Goddess	Nominated	

=== Drama Desk Awards ===
Year	Category	Nominated work	Result	Ref.
2018	Costume Design of a Musical	Bella: An American Tall Tale	Nominated	
2018	Outstanding Costume Design of a Play	School Girls; Or, the African Mean Girls Play	Nominated	
2019	Outstanding Costume Design of a Play	By the Way, Meet Vera Stark	Nominated	
2019	Outstanding Costume Design of a Play	If Pretty Hurts Ugly Must Be a Muhfucka	Nominated	
2024	Outstanding Costume Design of a Musical	Buena Vista Social Club	Nominated	
2025	Outstanding Costume Design of a Play	Our Town	Won	

=== Lucille Lortel Awards ===
Year	Category	Nominated work	Result	Ref.
2018	Outstanding Costume Design	School Girls; Or, the African Mean Girls Play	Won	
2018	Outstanding Costume Design	Bella: An American Tall Tale	Nominated	
2019	Outstanding Costume Design	By the Way, Meet Vera Stark	Nominated	
2020	Outstanding Costume Design	BLKS	Nominated	
2024	Outstanding Costume Design	Buena Vista Social Club	Nominated	

=== Tony Awards ===
Year	Category	Nominated work	Result	Ref.
2020	Best Costume Design in a Play	Slave Play	Nominated	
2020	Best Costume Design in a Play	A Soldier's Play	Nominated	
2024	Best Costume Design in a Play	Jaja's African Hair Brading	Won	
2024	Best Costume Design in a Play	Appropriate	Nominated	
2024	Best Costume Design in a Musical	Hell's Kitchen	Nominated	
2025	Best Costume Design in a Musical	Buena Vista Social Club	Nominated	
