= Jaja's African Hair Braiding =

Play written by Jocelyn Bioh

- Original language: English
- Written by: Jocelyn Bioh
- Genre: Comedy
- Setting: Harlem, Present Day

Premiere
- Date: 2023
- Place: Manhattan Theatre Club

Jaja's African Hair Braiding is a 2023 comedic play written by Ghanaian-American playwright Jocelyn Bioh. The play premiered on Broadway as part of the Manhattan Theatre Club's 2023–2024 season.

== Synopsis ==
Jaja’s African Hair Braiding in Harlem is a salon full of funny, whip-smart, talented women ready to make you look and feel nice-nice. Every day, a lively and eclectic group of West African immigrant hair braiders are creating masterpieces on the heads of neighborhood women. On this particularly muggy summer day, Jaja’s rule-following daughter Marie is running the shop while her mother prepares for her courthouse, green-card wedding—to a man no one seems to particularly like. Just like her mother, Dreamer Marie is trying to secure her future; she’s just graduated high school and all she wants to do is go to college. While Marie deals with the customers’ and stylists’ laugh-out-loud drama, news pierces the hearts of the women of the salon, galvanizing their connections and strengthening the community they have longed to make in the United States. The uncertainty of their circumstances simmers below the surface of their lives and when it boils over, it forces this tight-knit community to confront what it means to be an outsider on the edge of the place they call home.

== Notable cast and characters ==
Character	Broadway (2023)	Tour (2024-2025)
Jaja	Somi Kakoma	Victoire Charles
Miriam	Brittany Adebumola	Bisserat Tseggai
Jennifer	Rachel Christopher	Mia Ellis
Ndidi	Maechi Aharanwa	Aisha Sougou
Aminata	Nana Mensah	Tiffany Renee Johnson
Marie	Dominique Thorne	Jordan Rice
Bea	Zenzi Williams	Awa Sal Secka
Chrissy/Michelle/LaNiece	Kalyne Coleman	Melanie Brezill
Vanessa/Radia/Sheila	Lakisha May	Colby N. Muhammad
James/Sock Man/DVD Man/Jewelry Man	Michael Oloyede	Yao Dogbe

== Production history ==
The play premiered on Broadway at the Samuel J. Friedman Theatre on October 3, 2023, with previews starting September 12. The play closed on November 19, 2023, after a limited-run of 56 performances. The show extended twice from its original end date and offered live streams of the show for the final week of performances. The play was directed by Whitney White and was commissioned by the Williamstown Theatre Festival in 2018. Among the producers of the show are Madison Wells Live, LaChanze and Taraji P. Henson.

Following the Broadway production, the show launched a tour beginning in September 2024 at Arena Stage in Washington, D.C., Berkeley Repertory Theatre in November 2024, and Chicago Shakespeare Theater in January 2025. It will also make its New England premiere at SpeakEasy Stage Company in Boston in May 2025.

== Critical reception ==
The play has received critical acclaim. Aramide Tinubu wrote in Variety, "The beauty of Jaja’s African Hair Braiding is the play's ability to bring life to a seemingly mundane space. ... The play moves beyond the intricate hairstyles to highlight the women at the heart of these shops. These are women boasting bold laughs and heavy hearts, who twist and manipulate hair until their fingers swell from the effort. Director Whitney White presents the ecosystem of the braiding shop without extensive explanation. It's either a place you know intimately or have never encountered. In presenting this intimate space, without frill or excessive polish, she exposes the full scope of Black womanhood with its joys, delights, pains and sorrows as we experience them daily."

Whilst theatre critic Jesse Green wrote in The New York Times, "The first 80 minutes of the 90-minute play are a buffet of delights. ... Jaja's is full of such treasurable moments, when the drama feels tightly woven with the comedy. And if the weave frays a bit at the end, what doesn't?"

Charles Isherwood in The Wall Street Journal wrote, "Bioh draws her characters with sharp skill and provides them with colorfully contrasted personalities. And as the day wears on and we catch glimpses of the difficulties, minor and major, of their experience, the playwright subtly underscores how their lives are all circumscribed by their uncertain status."

== Awards and nominations ==
=== Broadway ===
Year	Award	Category	Nominee	Result	Ref.
2024	Tony Awards	Best Play	Jocelyn Bioh	Nominated	
2024	Tony Awards	Best Direction of a Play	Whitney White	Nominated	
2024	Tony Awards	Best Scenic Design of a Play	David Zinn	Nominated	
2024	Tony Awards	Best Costume Design of a Play	Dede Ayite	Won	
2024	Tony Awards	Best Sound Design of a Play	Stefania Bulbarella and Justin Ellington	Nominated	
2024	Tony Awards	Special Tony Award	Nikiya Mathis (Hair and Wig Design)	Won	
2024	Drama Desk Award	Outstanding Play	Jocelyn Bioh	Nominated	
2024	Drama Desk Award	Outstanding Featured Performance in a Play	Brittany Adebumola	Nominated	
2024	Drama Desk Award	Outstanding Wig and Hair Design	Nikiya Mathis	Won	
2024	Drama League Awards	Outstanding Production of a Play	Jocelyn Bioh	Nominated	
2024	Drama League Awards	Outstanding Direction of a Play	Whitney White	Nominated	
2024	Drama League Awards	Distinguished Performance	Zenzi Williams	Nominated	
2024	Outer Critics Circle Awards	Outstanding New Broadway Play	Jocelyn Bioh	Nominated	
2024	Outer Critics Circle Awards	Outstanding Costume Design	Dede Ayite	Nominated	
