= Vivienne Benesch =

Vivienne Benesch is a theatre director and former artistic director of the Chautauqua Theatre who is currently artistic director at North Carolina's PlayMakers Repertory Company, a position she has held since 2016. As part of her work at PlayMakers, Benesch focuses on amplifying the work of women playwrights through their @PLAY program.

Benesch trained as an actor and received her MFA from Tisch School of the Arts and has been on the faculty of Juilliard. As an actor, Benesch won an Obie Award in 2005 for her role in Lee Blessing's Going to St. Ives and played opposite Dame Maggie Smith in a 2007 London production of The Lady from Dubuque. In film, she appeared in the 2007 comedy horror Teeth as Kim, the mother of the protagonist. In 2017, she received the Zelda Fichandler Award.

In 2019, she made her Washington, D.C. directorial debut with the Folger Theatre production of Love's Labor Lost. In 2022, she directed Noah Haidle's Birthday Candles, starring NYU classmate Debra Messing.
