= Jocelyn Bioh =

American dramatist

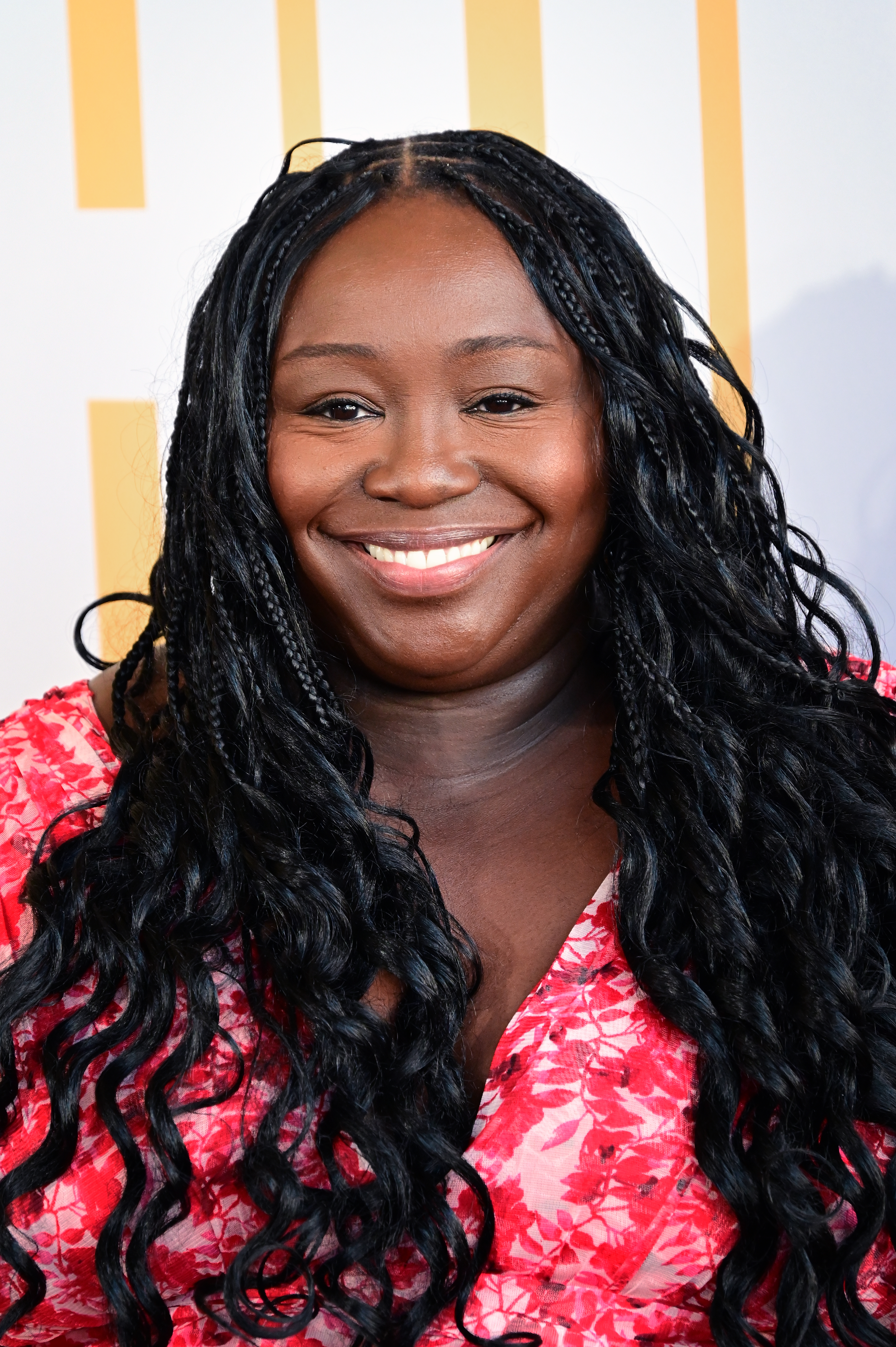
- Bioh in 2026
- Born: New York City, New York, U.S.
- Education: Ohio State University (BA); Columbia University (MFA)
- Occupation: Actress, playwright, writer
- Awards: Lortel Award for Outstanding Play (2018); John Gassner Playwriting Award; Hull-Warriner Award (2018)

Jocelyn Bioh is a Ghanaian-American writer, playwright and actress. She graduated from Ohio State University with a BA degree in English and got her master's degree in Playwriting from Columbia University. Jocelyn's Broadway credits include The Curious Incident of the Dog in the Night-Time. She has performed in regional and off-Broadway productions of An Octoroon, Bootycandy and For Colored Girls. She has written many of her own plays that have been produced in national and collegiate theaters. Among her best-known works are Nollywood Dreams (2015) and School Girls; Or, the African Mean Girls Play (2017). Bioh is a playwright with Manhattan Theatre Club (MTC) and Atlantic Theater Company, is a resident playwright at Lincoln Center and is a 2017-18 Tow Playwright-in-Residence with MCC. She is a writer on the Hulu show Tiny Beautiful Things.

== Early life ==
Jocelyn Bioh was born and raised in New York City. She is of Ghanaian-American descent. She grew up in Washington Heights with her parents (who immigrated from Ghana in 1968). As a girl, Bioh attended the Milton Hershey School, a boarding school for economically disadvantaged students. There her love of theater began and she chose to pursue it as a career. Bioh is the youngest of her siblings—her brother is a doctor, her sister is a social worker. She chose a completely different career path and prides herself on being "the black sheep" of the family. While she has had much success as both an actor and playwright, Bioh told The New York Times that she is convinced her mother will "[n]ever forgive [her] for not being a doctor".

== Education ==
Bioh received her Bachelor of Arts degree in English and Theater from Ohio State University. Later, she earned her master's degree in Playwriting from Columbia University. While she attended Ohio State, Bioh quickly found that the theater department relied heavily on typecasting, which meant there were not a lot of roles for her as an actress of color. She realized that "if she wanted better roles, she would have to start writing them". When she got her Master's in Playwriting at Columbia that is what she did. In the beginning, she wrote a lot of "anguished, kitchen-sink dramas". She learned that she did not have to write dramas to be profound or poignant about today's social climate. She found a lot of poignancy in comedy, which describes most of her current plays.

== Playwriting career ==
Her plays include:

- African Americans (Ruby Prize Finalist 2011)
- School Girls; Or, the African Mean Girls Play
- Nollywood Dreams (The Kilroys' List, 2015)
- The Ladykiller's Love Story, featuring music and lyrics by CeeLo Green
- Happiness and Joe, a romantic comedy
- Merry Wives, a translation/adaptation of The Merry Wives of Windsor set in Harlem, developed for Shakespeare in the Park
- Jaja's African Hair Braiding, a comedy that marked her Broadway debut in the fall of 2023

== Production history ==
School Girls; Or, the African Mean Girls Play featured in the MCC PlayLab Series at the Lucille Lortel Theater (November 2017), directed by Tony Award-winning, Rebecca Taichman. The play is set in a boarding school and is centered upon two students, the school's "Queen bee" Paulina and a new student, Ericka. The two come to odds when a pageant recruiter for the Miss Universe pageant takes an interest in Ericka over Paulina, who endeavors to win the crown for herself. Taichman said the play "smashes up this real comic point of view with profound sadness and anger. But it's lifted through this comic impulse. Always."

The play was presented in May and June 2022 at the Arden Theatre Company in Philadelphia, Pennsylvania.

Her Broadway playwriting debut came in the fall of 2023 with Jaja's African Hair Braiding. The comedy, produced by Manhattan Theatre Club at the Samuel J. Friedman Theatre in New York City, was directed by Whitney White and was described on the show's official website in this way:

"This dazzling world premiere welcomes you into Jaja’s bustling hair braiding shop in Harlem where every day, a lively and eclectic group of West African immigrant hair braiders are creating masterpieces on the heads of neighborhood women. During one sweltering summer day, love will blossom, dreams will flourish and secrets will be revealed. The uncertainty of their circumstances simmers below the surface of their lives and when it boils over, it forces this tight-knit community to confront what it means to be an outsider on the edge of the place they call home."

The play was selected as a New York Times Critic's Pick, and was nominated for the 2024 Tony Award for Best Play. It received two extensions and had its final week of performances streamed live worldwide.

On March 17, 2026, the Manhattan Theatre Club announced they will be producing School Girls at the Samuel J. Friedman Theatre as part of their 2026-2027 season. Whitney White is attached to direct the production, which is currently slated to begin performances on September 8.

== Acting career ==
Bioh has appeared on Broadway and numerous Off-Broadway productions throughout her career. In 2014, she was an original ensemble member of the Broadway production of The Curious Incident of the Dog in the Night-Time. She has also had Off-Broadway roles in Soho Repertory Theatre's production of An Octoroon, Playwrights Horizons's Men on Boats, and Signature Theatre Company's production of Suzan-Lori Parks' The Red Letter Plays: In the Blood. As an actor, Bioh caught the eye of playwright, Branden Jacobs-Jenkins. After receiving her MFA in Playwriting from Columbia University, she took a break from writing and began auditioning. In 2010, Bioh earned the role of Topsy in Jacobs-Jenkins' play Neighbors. After her performance, he "went on to write the part of the slave Minnie in An Octoroon specifically for [her]". Bioh also performed in Jacobs-Jenkins' play Everybody, at the Signature Theater Company in January 2017 and received a Lucille Lortel Award nomination for Outstanding Featured Actress in a Play.

== Style and themes presented in her work ==
As a writer, Bioh is identified with affectionate and fun narratives that also humanize people, including their emotions. In an interview with the New York Times, she noted that she favors the comedic style because she finds humor in everything. Her plays, School Girls, Nollywood Dreams and Happiness and Joe try to find something positive in tragedy and to destroy stereotypes attributed to persons of color. School Girls was inspired by Erica Nego and the 2011 Miss Universe Ghana competition, and the controversy around colorism that this contest sparked.

Bioh, however, is also drawn to stories and characters that defy stereotypes. "As an artist, I live in a constant cloud of goals, dreams, and certainly risks", she told Darrel Alejandro Holnes from Stage and Candor, an online theater forum. When asked about working with director Will Davis on a production of Men in Boats, Bioh said: "We have a dance background and understand the importance of telling stories with our bodies."

== Critical reception ==
Bioh's work has been included on The Kilroys' List in both 2015 and 2016. According to The Kilroys' List website: "The List...includes the results of [an] industry survey of excellent un- and underproduced new plays by female and trans playwrights. It is a tool for producers committed to ending the systemic underrepresentation of female and trans playwrights in the American theater."

"She's a heat-seeking missile.... I don't ever want to let her go," says playwright Jacobs-Jenkins of Bioh. Nigel Smith, director of Neighbors (2010) said of Bioh: "Jocelyn is go for broke, no stone unturned.... She’s not an artist to be messed with."

== Awards and honors ==
Year	Award	Category	Work	Result	Ref.
2011	The Ruby Prize		African Americans	Finalist	
2015	The Kilroys' List		Nollywood Dreams	Won	
2016	The Kilroys' List		School Girls; Or, the African Mean Girls Play	Won	
2017	Lucille Lortel Award	Outstanding Featured Actress in a Play	Everybody	Nominated	
2018	Lucille Lortel Award	Outstanding Play	School Girls; Or, the African Mean Girls Play	Won	
2018	Outer Critics Circle Award	John Gassner Award	School Girls; Or, the African Mean Girls Play	Won	
2018	Dramatists Guild of America	Hull-Warriner Award for Outstanding Play	School Girls; Or, the African Mean Girls Play	Won	
2018	Off-Broadway Alliance Award	Best New Play	School Girls; Or, the African Mean Girls Play	Nominated	
2018	Drama Desk Award	Outstanding Play	School Girls; Or, the African Mean Girls Play	Nominated	
2024	Tony Award	Best Play	Jaja's African Hair Braiding	Nominated	
