= Liberation (play) =

2025 play by Bess Wohl

- Broadway Promotional Poster
- Original language: English
- Written by: Bess Wohl
- Setting: Ohio, 1970; present day

Premiere
- Date: January 31, 2025
- Place: Laura Pels Theatre (off-Broadway)

Liberation is a 2025 American memory play by Bess Wohl. Developed by the Roundabout Theatre Company, it explores second-wave feminism, memory, and the complexities of social change across generations. The play premiered off-Broadway at the Laura Pels Theatre in February 2025, directed by Whitney White, and transferred to Broadway in October 2025 at the James Earl Jones Theatre. The production won the 2026 Tony Award for Best Play. On May 4, 2026, it was announced that Bess Wohl won the 2026 Pulitzer Prize for Drama for Liberation.

== Premise ==
Set in Ohio in 1970 the play opens in a rec-center basement where Lizzie convenes a consciousness-raising group of women. Fifty years later Lizzie's daughter looks back to try to understand her mother's radical past. Structured as a memory play, the narrative shifts fluidly between past and present, with the narrator directly addressing the audience.

== Productions ==
=== Off-Broadway (2025) ===
Liberation premiered off-Broadway at Roundabout's Laura Pels Theatre. Previews began on January 31, 2025, with an opening night on February 20. It ran until April 6, having extended a week from its originally planned closing date of March 30. The production was directed by Whitney White. The creative team included David Zinn (scenic design), Qween Jean (costume design), Cha See (lighting), and Palmer Hefferan (sound).

=== Broadway (2025) ===
In August 2025 it was announced that a Broadway production had been scheduled at the James Earl Jones Theatre for a 14-week engagement. Previews started October 8, with an opening on October 28, 2025. The original off-Broadway cast reprised their roles. The engagement was later extended by three weeks to February 1, 2026.

=== London (2027) ===
In May 2026 a London production was announced for 2027. Daryl Roth, Eva Price, Rachel Sussman, Eleanor Lloyd Productions, and Eilene Davidson Productions are involved in the production.

== Cast and characters ==
Character	Off-Broadway	Broadway
Character	2025	
Lizzie	Susannah Flood	Susannah Flood
Margie	Betsy Aidem	Betsy Aidem
Dora	Audrey Corsa	Audrey Corsa
Joanne	Kayla Davion	Kayla Davion
Celeste	Kristolyn Lloyd	Kristolyn Lloyd
Isidora	Irene Sofia Lucio	Irene Sofia Lucio
Bill	Charlie Thurston	Charlie Thurston
Susan	Adina Verson	Adina Verson

== Reception ==
The play received acclaim from critics. Sara Holdren of Vulture praised it as "the best play I've seen this season", lauding how it "balances the intensely personal and the broadly civic, the ethical and the theatrical, with extraordinary rigor and grace".

The Week remarked that the play "takes an old form and shakes it like a freshly laundered sheet in the breeze", singling out the cast's performances in a "growing wave of charisma, camaraderie, tenderness, and tension".

The Wrap declared that "2025 has already delivered its first great new play", commending Wohl's deft mixture of sobering, funny, provocative, and "totally engaging" elements and noting her narrator is "even more direct and efficient ... than the Stage Manager in Our Town".

Some reviewers offered more reserved praise. Rachel Graham of TheaterMania observed that while the play does create "multidimensional characters and deftly balances a personal story with the history of the women's movement", ultimately "the landing doesn't quite stick", though "there's enough to keep the thoughtful Liberation in the air throughout its two-and-a-half hours".

== Awards and nominations ==
=== Off-Broadway production ===
Year	Award	Category	Nominee	Result	Ref.
2025	Drama Desk Awards	Outstanding Play		Nominated	
2025	Drama Desk Awards	Outstanding Director of a Play	Whitney White	Nominated	
2025	Drama Desk Awards	Outstanding Wig and Hair	Nikiya Mathis	Nominated	
2025	Drama Desk Awards	Outstanding Ensemble	The cast of Liberation (Note: Betsy Aidem, Audrey Corsa, Kayla Davion, Susannah Flood, Kristolyn Lloyd, Irene Sofia Lucio, Charlie Thurston, and Adina Verson)	Won	
2025	Outer Critics Circle Awards	Outstanding New Off-Broadway Play		Won	
2025	Outer Critics Circle Awards	Outstanding Featured Performer in an Off-Broadway Play	Betsy Aidem	Nominated	
2025	Lucille Lortel Award	Outstanding Play		Nominated	
2025	Lucille Lortel Award	Outstanding Director	Whitney White	Nominated	
2025	Lucille Lortel Award	Outstanding Lead Performer in a Play	Susannah Flood	Nominated	
2025	Lucille Lortel Award	Outstanding Featured Performer in a Play	Betsy Aidem	Nominated	
2025	Lucille Lortel Award	Outstanding Costume Design	Qween Jean	Nominated	
2025	New York Drama Critics Circle	Best Ensemble	The cast of Liberation (Note: Betsy Aidem, Audrey Corsa, Kayla Davion, Susannah Flood, Kristolyn Lloyd, Irene Sofia Lucio, Charlie Thurston, and Adina Verson)	Won	
2025	Dorian Award	Outstanding Off-Broadway Production		Nominated	
2025	Dorian Award	Outstanding Lead Performance in an Off-Broadway Production	Susannah Flood	Nominated	
2025	Dorian Award	Outstanding Featured Performance in an Off-Broadway Production	Betsy Aidem	Nominated	

=== Broadway production ===
Year	Award	Category	Nominee	Result	Ref.
2026	Drama League Awards	Outstanding Production of a Play		Won	
2026	Drama League Awards	Distinguished Performance	Susannah Flood	Nominated	
2026	Pulitzer Prize for Drama		Bess Wohl	Won	
2026	Tony Awards	Best Play	Bess Wohl	Won	
2026	Tony Awards	Best Leading Actress in a Play	Susannah Flood	Nominated	
2026	Tony Awards	Best Featured Actress in a Play	Betsy Aidem	Nominated	
2026	Tony Awards	Best Direction of a Play	Whitney White	Nominated	
2026	Tony Awards	Best Costume Design of a Play	Qween Jean	Nominated	
