= Nana Mensah =

American actress (born 1988)

- Born: Nana Afiah Mensah; New Haven, Connecticut
- Education: University of Pennsylvania (BA)
- Occupation: Actress
- Known for: The Diplomat

Nana Mensah was born on January, 10th 1988. She is a Ghanaian American actress, writer, and director known for her roles in The Diplomat, 13 Reasons Why, An African City, New Amsterdam, Bonding, and The Chair. Mensah's directorial debut, Queen of Glory, had its festival premiere in 2021, and was released in 2022.

== Early life and education ==
Nana Afiah Mensah was born in New Haven, Connecticut and raised in the Farmington Valley region. Her parents emigrated from Ghana in the 1970s. Her father is a chemical engineer. She has one brother. She attended the Loomis Chaffee School, a private boarding school. Her high school drama teacher, Brian Kosanovich, encouraged her to pursue acting professionally.

After she earned a Bachelor of Arts degree in French and sociology from the University of Pennsylvania, her parents wanted her to attend law school. After working in the legal field, she moved to New York City to become an actress in 2009. To support herself, she worked in restaurants, retail, administration, and childcare. She trained at the now-defunct Actors Center, the Shakespeare Lab, at the Public Theater, and LAByrinth Theater Company Master Class.

== Career ==
In 2009, Mensah played Leslie in The Film You Did Not See. She spent the next few years landing roles in short films like 2010 comedy Behold the Swelling Scene, 2012 comedy Alternate Sides, and the 2013 biographical drama Daadi.

In 2014, Mensah played Sade, Nigerian-Ghanaian expat in An African City. The web series created by Nicole Amarteifio was dubbed "Africa's answer to Sex and the City". She reprised the role for season two.

Mensah has starred in various off-Broadway roles including Nollywood Dreams, reprising the role of Dede in after the production shut down due to COVID-19. Other credits include The Bacchae, Mother Courage and Her Children, Inked Baby, and A Question of Impeachment.

In 2016, she starred as Clare in the Obie Award-winning play, I'll Never Love Again. In 2017 she played Tamyra in Man from Nebraska, for which she earned an Outer Critics Circle Award nomination for Outstanding Featured Actress. In 2020, she co-starred in Farewell Amor as Linda, which premiered at the 2019 Sundance Film Festival's U.S. Dramatic Competition.

In 2021, Mensah premiered Queen of Glory, a film about a Ghanaian-American academic who inherits a Christian bookstore after the passing of her mother. Mensah wrote, directed, and starred in the film which was completed in 30 days, but took over seven years total to complete. She cited Zhang Yimou's Raise the Red Lantern, Wong Kar-wai's In the Mood For Love, films by the Duplass Brothers, Kevin Smith's Clerks, and Lena Dunham's Tiny Furniture as influences. Mensah stated that frustration with limited and stereotypical roles led her to create the film as an artistic outlet: "I wasn't given artistic opportunities anywhere else, so I had to go out and make some." The film was funded through investors, Kickstarter campaigns, and Mensah's own savings.

Queen of Glory premiered at the 2021 Tribeca Film Festival U.S. Narrative Competition. Mensah won Best New Narrative Director and Special Jury Prize for Artistic Expression. In February 2022, the film was acquired by Film Movement with plans for a theatrical and video-on-demand release. The film was nominated for Best First Feature at the 2021 Film Independent Spirit Awards. It won numerous film festival prizes, including two awards from the Champs-Élysées Film Festival and the inaugural California Film Institute's Mind the Gap Creation Prize.

In 2021, The Chair premiered on Netflix, in which Mensah portrays Yasmin "Yaz" McKay, a popular English professor. She was a staff writer on Random Acts of Flyness, Amazon's The Power, and the second season of the Netflix series Bonding. She sold an-hour long drama pilot called Imperium to AMC.

Mensah has a recurring role on The Diplomat, which premiered on Netflix in 2023, portraying Billie Appiah, the Chief of Staff to the President of the United States.

She also appeared on Broadway in 2023 in Jaja's African Hair Braiding. In 2024, she starred opposite Adrien Brody in the play The Fear of 13 at the Donmar Warehouse.

== Filmography ==
=== Film ===
Year	Title	Role	Notes
2009	The Film You Did Not See	Leslie	
2014	Love or Something Like That	Asantewaa	Drama
2015	Beasts of No Nation	Young Girl	Drama / War
2017	The Misogynists	Blake	
2018	Like Father	American Airlines Agent	
2020	Farewell Amor	Linda	
2020	The King of Staten Island	Kindergarten Teacher	
2020	The Man in the Woods	Ethel Patterson	
2021	Queen of Glory	Sarah Obeng	Also writer and director
2021	After Yang	Cafe Owner	

=== Television ===
Year	Title	Role	Notes
2014	An African City	Sade	10 episodes
2015	The Walker	Oprah	Episode: "What Being a Celebrity Escort Is Like"
2017–2018	Madam Secretary	Sally Palermo	3 episodes
2018	The Good Fight	Kristen	Episode: "Day 422"
2018	Orange Is the New Black	Hairdresser	Episode: "Well This Took a Dark Turn"
2018	Elementary	Agent Kerner	Episode: "Breathe"
2019	New Amsterdam	Dr. Camila Candelario	12 episodes
2019	Evil	Esther	Episode: "2 Fathers"
2019–2020	13 Reasons Why	Amara Josephine Achola	12 episodes
2020	Little America	Eunice	Episode: "The Baker"
2021	Bonding	Mistress Mira	6 episodes
2021	The Chair	Yaz McKay	6 episodes
2023–present	The Diplomat	Billie Appiah	Recurring role
2024	Presumed Innocent	Det. Alana Rodriguez	8 episodes
2025	Big Boys	Eleanor	4 episodes

=== Stage ===
Year	Title	Role	Venue	Ref.
2023	Jaja's African Hair Braiding	Aminata	Samuel J. Friedman Theatre, Broadway	
2024	The Fear of 13	Jackie Schaffer	Donmar Warehouse, Off-West End	
