= The Comeuppance =

2023 play by Branden Jacobs-Jenkins

- Original language: English
- Written by: Branden Jacobs-Jenkins
- Genre: Drama
- Setting: Washington, D.C. Present Day

Premiere
- Date: May 16, 2023
- Place: Alice Griffin Theatre

The Comeuppance is a dramatic stage play written by American playwright Branden Jacobs-Jenkins.

The play tells the story of five friends reuniting for their high school reunion in a suburb outside Washington D.C., set in the present day. The friends deal with the passage of time, aging, and the discussion of death being sooner than later as they approach middle age.

== Production history ==
=== Off-Broadway (2023) ===
The play premiered Off-Broadway at the Alice Griffin Jewel Box Theatre, located within the Pershing Square Signature Center. The show played from May 16, 2023, until July 9, 2023. The show was directed by Eric Ting. The Off-Broadway production was a critical success, and was given a Critics Pick by New York Times reviewer Jesse Green. The entire cast was recognized as Outstanding Ensemble by the Obie Awards. Shannon Tyo was also given an Obie Award for her performance as Kristina. The play was nominated for five Lucille Lortel Awards, including Outstanding Play.

=== London (2024) ===
The play premiered at the Almeida Theatre in London April 6, 2024 and ran through May 18, 2024, again directed by Eric Ting.

== Original cast and characters ==
Character	Off-Broadway (2023)	London (2024)
Emilio	Caleb Eberhardt	Anthony Welsh
Ursula	Brittany Bradford	Tamara Lawrance
Kristina	Shannon Tyo	Katie Leung
Paco	Bobby Moreno	Ferdinand Kingsley
Caitlin	Susannah Flood	Yolanda Kettle
