= Imitation of God =

Religious instruction to find salvation

Imitation of God (Latin: imitatio Dei) is the religious precept of a person finding salvation by striving to realize their concept of supreme being. It is found in ancient Greek philosophy and several world religions. In some branches of Christianity, however, it plays a key role.

== Hebrew Bible ==
Some scholars, such as Cyril Rodd, argue that the concept is not important in the ethics of the Hebrew Bible.

== Judaism ==
The concept of imitatio Dei—generally taken to be a mitzvah—in Judaism is derived, in part, from the concept of imago Dei, being made in the image of God. Not only do people in the Torah aspire to take on godly virtues, they are aided by the depiction of God as a human—anthropomorphism. The concept is arguably best expressed in the following quote, taken from Deuteronomy:

The LORD will establish you as His holy people, as He swore to you, if you keep the commandments of the LORD your God and walk in His ways.

This exhortation to emulate God's ways was later to become part of the basis of rabbinic Judaism; see Hashkafa § Principles. Jews are exhorted to perform acts of kindness similar to the ones ascribed to God. Examples are burying the dead (as God buried Moses), visiting the sick (as God visited Abraham) and some very similar mitzvot. The Talmud states: "As He is merciful, so should you be merciful".

== Ancient Greek philosophy ==
Imitatio Dei appears in one form or another in Plato, Aristotle (where not only humans but everything else 'strives' toward the unmoved mover), and the Stoic philosophers.

== Christianity ==
The Christian disciple is told to imitate God on several occasions. Matthew 5:48 states, "Therefore you are to be perfect, as your heavenly Father is perfect." Luke 6:36 states, "Be merciful, just as your Father is merciful." In Ephesians 5, they are told by Paul to "Be imitators of God, therefore, as dearly loved children". The believer is also advised to follow the ways of Jesus, notably in 1 Corinthians 11:1: "Follow my example, as I follow the example of Christ."

=== Catholicism and Eastern Christianity ===
The Imitation of God is one of the core principles in Catholicism and Eastern Orthodoxy, as well as in Oriental Orthodoxy (Syriac Orthodoxy, Coptic Orthodoxy, Ethiopian Orthodoxy, and the Armenian Apostolic faith). The Catholic Church fully endorses the concept of Imitatio Dei/Christi. In Catholicism and Orthodoxy, it is integrally related to the concept of Divinization/Theosis.

The general understanding is that a person can become more similar to God over time, a process called theosis in Greek. This doctrine derives from the biblical mandate to be holy as God is Holy (Lev 20.26). It can be achieved by purification (katharsis) and illumination (theoria), the highest point in illumination is the union with God. The best imitation of God is not only the man's effort, but it is mainly achieved by the grace of God. Nevertheless, Eastern Orthodox theology does not usually understand this tri-partite ascent as an attempt to become like God, but as a way to unite with the one God. For most Orthodox theologians, imitatio Dei is not the way to salvation if it is understood as an individual, personal attempt to become god-like.

In Roman Catholicism, the same concepts have been treated under different names (Via purgativa, via iluminativa and via unitiva) by St. John of the Cross and St. Theresa of Avila. Via purgativa is the Roman Catholic equivalent to katharsis, and theoria is subdivided between illumination and full mystical union. This three-step scheme is also found in the Eastern categories of prayer; ordinary prayer, prayer with mind and heart, and unceasing prayer.

=== Protestantism ===
In Protestantism, the picture is different. In the Anglo-Saxon tradition Imitatio dei is widely accepted, whereas the Lutheran tradition prefers to talk of conformitas (in German Nachfolge) instead of Nachahmung (imitation), because Jesus was singular and cannot and need not be imitated, but followed.

== Deism ==
Though lacking an official scripture, the practice of Deism is described by Thomas Paine in The Age of Reason: "The true Deist has but one Deity, and his religion consists in contemplating the power, wisdom, and benignity of the Deity in his works, and in endeavoring to imitate him in everything moral, scientifically, and mechanical." He also explains that the works of the Deity are strictly found in "the Creation we behold" where "God speaketh universally to man." Paine gives an example when he condemns the doctrine of loving the enemy, in which he states, "We imitate the moral character of the Creator by forbearing with each other, for he forbears with all."

== See also ==
- Imitation of Christ (disambiguation)
- Virtue ethics
