= Queen of Glory =

2021 American comedy-drama film by Nana Mensah

- Poster
- Directed by: Nana Mensah
- Written by: Nana Mensah
- Produced by: Jamund Washington; Kelley Robins Hicks; Baff Akoto; Anya Migdal
- Starring: Nana Mensah; Meeko Gattuso; Oberon K. A. Adjepong; Adam Leon; Russell G. Jones; Anya Migdal
- Cinematography: Cybel Martin
- Edited by: Cooper Troxell
- Production company: Cape Coast Media
- Distributed by: Film Movement
- Release dates: June 15, 2021 (Tribeca); July 15, 2022 (US)
- Running time: 78 minutes
- Country: United States
- Languages: English; Twi

Queen of Glory is a 2021 American comedy-drama film written and directed by and starring Nana Mensah, in her directorial debut. Set in the Bronx, New York City, it depicts a Ghanaian-American scientist who inherits a Christian bookstore from her deceased mother.

The film had its world premiere in the US Narrative Competition section at the Tribeca Festival in June 2021, where Mensah received the Best New Narrative Director prize and the Special Jury Prize for Artistic Expression. The film garnered two nominations at the 37th Independent Spirit Awards: Meeko Gattuso for Best Supporting Male for his role as Pitt, and the film for Best First Feature.

== Plot ==
Sarah Obeng is a doctoral student in neuro-oncology at Columbia University. She plans to abandon her program and relocate to Ohio, where her colleague and boyfriend Lyle, whom she expects to divorce his current wife, has been offered a post. Her mother dies unexpectedly, and Sarah inherits her house and a Christian bookstore named King of Glory in the Pelham Parkway section of the Bronx, which she decides to sell. Sarah's father returns from Ghana, and she holds a wake at the house, but relatives insist a traditional Ghanaian funeral take place. The bookstore's sole employee is Pitt, an ex-convict. Sarah befriends him, and withholds her plan to sell the store from him.

== Cast ==
- Nana Mensah as Sarah Obeng
- Meeko Gattuso as Pitt
- Oberon K. A. Adjepong as Godwin Obeng
- Adam Leon as Lyle Cummings
- Russell G. Jones as Hezekiah Falusi
- Anya Migdal as Tanya Malinova

== Production ==
Mensah began writing the screenplay in 2012, after showing her script of "a lavish $100 million biopic" set in 1940s Ghana to a filmmaker friend and being told that, in order to get it made, she needed to make a smaller film first. Mensah initially did not intend to direct the film, but she decided to do so after failing to find a director who shared her vision. She was also "on the fence" about starring in the film, so her involvement as the writer-director-star was "a budgetary necessity".

Filming took place in the Bronx in 2014. The bookstore, King of Glory, was owned by Mensah's aunt and uncle. Expenses for post-production were raised through crowdfunding on Kickstarter in 2015. Describing the financing process, Mensah said, "It was extremely hard to raise the money ... we bootstrapped it and took meetings with friends of friends and asked people to introduce us to other people so we could maximize our network. That's how we found a group of investors. Then we did Kickstarter and then we put in money ourselves."

Anya Migdal, who plays a Russian-speaking neighbor and also produced the film, and Mensah met in an acting class. Mensah said they "bonded over our frustrations of being intelligent women who were not being asked to ever explore that side of ourselves in our acting roles".

The archival footage of Ghanaian gatherings interspersed throughout the film was curated by Rita Mawuena Benissan, an archivist Mensah connected with on Instagram. Mensah conceived of using archival footage in the editing stage. She described the footage as a "link to the old country" in a film "about the new world".

== Release ==
In April 2021, Magnolia Pictures International acquired worldwide and US sales rights to the film. In February 2022, Film Movement acquired the US rights. The film was released at BAM Rose Cinemas in Brooklyn on July 15, 2022, expanding to other US cities in the subsequent weeks.

== Reception ==
On review aggregator website Rotten Tomatoes, the film holds an approval rating of 84%, based on 19 reviews, and an average rating of 7.2/10.

Nick Schager of Variety wrote, "Mensah evokes the intricate ties that bind immigrants to their heritages, and the way those connections can both aid and hinder personal growth and progress. The writer-director's concise storytelling captures that complicated stew with next to no wasted gestures or diversions".

Lovia Gyarkye of The Hollywood Reporter wrote that the film "avoids the usual tropes of 'West Africans in America' narratives by leaning into the small details of Ghanaian life", and called the film "tightly conceived, witty and compassionate" and "a love letter to children of Ghanaian immigrants and to the Bronx".

Peter Sobczynski of RogerEbert.com described the film as "like watching a well-oiled sitcom in which all of the performers are playing off of each other so beautifully they hardly seem to be acting at all". Lisa Kennedy of The New York Times wrote, "Mensah traverses the polyglot turf well, infusing details with astute affection and understated laughs".

Richard Brody of The New Yorker wrote, "Mensah looks in loving yet critical detail at the milieu in which she herself was raised and, working with the cinematographer Cybel Martin, realizes a distinctive style that's as memorable as the drama".
