= On Sugarland =

Pulitzer Prize Finalist Play

- 2022 Off-Broadway production poster
- Written by: Aleshea Harris
- Based on: Philoctetes and Antigone
- Setting: Southern United States

Premiere
- Date: February 5, 2022
- Place: New York Theatre Workshop
- Directed by: Whitney White

On Sugarland is a 2022 American play by Aleshea Harris. The play is a loose adaptation of Sophocles's Greek tragedies Philoctetes and Antigone, and centers a teenage girl calling on her matriarchal ancestors to learn the truth about her mother who died in an unnamed, allegorical war. The play takes place in a historical Southern cul-de-sac of mobile homes. On Sugarland was a finalist for the 2023 Pulitzer Prize for Drama.

== Production history ==
=== New York Theatre Workshop (2022) ===
On Sugarland had its world and Off-Broadway premiere on February 5, 2022, at New York Theatre Workshop. The production starred KiKi Layne with direction by Whitney White.

== Reception ==
The show has received mostly positive reviews. In the New York Theatre Guide, Naveen Kumar praised the show for its thrilling energy and rich depiction of trauma, writing that director White imbued "Harris's dreamlike character studies with a collective electricity that exceeds language". Maya Phillips of The New York Times also applauded the play's writing, noting that Harris delivered "tasty figurative gumdrops that subtly illuminate[d] the inner thoughts of the characters". However, the show received some criticism for its many complex themes and symbols, with critics writing that the play's inability to tackle all that it brought up left the show muddled.

== Awards and nominations ==
Year	Award	Category	Nominee	Result	Ref.
2022	Outer Critics Circle Awards	Outstanding New Off-Broadway Play		Nominated	
2022	Outer Critics Circle Awards	Outstanding Actress in a Play	Stephanie Berry	Nominated	
2023	Drama Desk Awards	Outstanding Director of a Play	Whitney White	Nominated	
2023	Drama Desk Awards	Outstanding Featured Actor in a Play	Billy Eugene Jones	Nominated	
2023	Drama Desk Awards	Outstanding Featured Actress in a Play	Stephanie Berry	Nominated	
2023	Drama Desk Awards	Outstanding Costume Design of a Play	Qween Jean	Nominated	
2023	Lucille Lortel Awards	Outstanding Play		Nominated	
2023	Lucille Lortel Awards	Outstanding Director	Whitney White	Nominated	
2023	Lucille Lortel Awards	Outstanding Choreographer	Raja Feather Kelly	Nominated	
2023	Lucille Lortel Awards	Outstanding Lead Performer in a Play	Stephanie Berry	Nominated	
