= Christabel Ekeh =

Ghanaian actress and model (born 1990)

- Born: October 16, 1990 (age 35)
- Education: University of Ghana
- Occupations: Actress, model
- Years active: 2008-present

Christabel Ekeh (born October 16, 1990) is a Ghanaian actress and model. She has been featured in more than eighty Ghanaian and Nigerian movies.

== Career ==
Ekeh started her career as a model and participated at the beauty pageant, Miss Malaika Ghana 2008 and won the second position.

Her acting career began when she featured in the Nigerian movie College Girls.

She is also known for the movie Potomanto.

== Personal life ==
In May 2022, Ekeh gave birth to baby boy.

== Filmography ==
- College Girls (2008)
- The Hidden Fantasy (2011)
- 100% Secret (2012) - Bridget
- Swagger Babes (2012) - Nikita
- Corporate Game (2012) - Aliyah
- Wrong Target (2012)
- Potomanto (2013) - Afia
- Super Models (2014) - Nuella
- Love or Something Like That (2014) - Sonia
- Stalemate (2016) - Witney
- Heaven (2016) - Heaven
- The Engagement (2016) - Ada
- Beautiful Ruins (2016) - Abynah
- Sidechic Gang (2018) - Lady
- Homecoming (2018) - Cynthia
- Getting Married (2018) - Peggy
- 2 Days After Friday (2019)
- Red Carpet (2022)
