= Birthday Candles =

Play by Noah Haidle

- 2022 Broadway production Playbill
- Original language: English
- Written by: Noah Haidle
- Genre: Drama

Premiere
- Date: 2018
- Place: Detroit
- Directed by: Vivienne Benesch

Birthday Candles is a play by Noah Haidle following a woman recreating the same birthday cake every year from age 17 to 101. Originally scheduled to open on Broadway in 2020, it was delayed due to the COVID-19 pandemic, eventually running at the American Airlines Theatre March through May 2022. It has been performed internationally and was nominated for two Outer Critics Circle Awards.

== Synopsis ==
Ernestine Ashworth recreates the same birthday cake each year as she ages from 17 to 101 without any external signs of aging. The actress playing Ashworth is on stage for the entire show. It is 90 minutes long, with no intermission.

== Production history ==
It was originally scheduled to open on April 2, 2020, but was delayed by the COVID-19 pandemic. It subsequently ran at the American Airlines Theatre (now named the Todd Haimes Theatre) from March 18 to May 29, 2022 (with opening night on April 10). There were 25 previews and 57 regular performances.

The Broadway production starred Debra Messing as Ernestine Ashworth and was directed by Messing's Tisch School of the Arts classmate Vivienne Benesch. The rest of the cast included Enrico Colantoni as Kenneth, John Earl Jelks as Matt/William, Crystal Finn as Joan/Alex/Beth, Susannah Flood as Alice/Madeline/Ernie, and Christopher Livingston as Billy/John. Set design was by Christine Jones, costume design by Toni-Leslie James, lighting design by Jen Schriever, sound design by John Gromada, hair & wig design by Matthew B. Armentrout, and makeup design by Kirk Cambridge-Del Pesche. The production featured original music by Kate Hopgood.

Birthday Candles was commissioned by Detroit Public Theatre in fall 2016, and Benesch oversaw a workshop during her tenure as artistic director of the Chautauqua Theater Company. Benesch directed a Chautauqua production in 2017 before it made its debut in Detroit in 2018.

It was translated into Swedish and staged at Playhouse Teater, Stockholm in October 2020. In November 2022, the play was translated into Hebrew and performed at the Cameri Theater in Tel Aviv, Israel, directed by the director and writer Ronnie Brodetzky, where it ran for two years. The same month, the Latvian translation of the play, directed by Alvis Hermanis, opened in the New Riga Theatre in Riga, Latvia.

== Critical reception ==
Birthday Candles was reviewed by Variety, Chicago Tribune, The New York Times, The Daily Beast, The New York Post, and the New York Daily News. Reviews commonly praised Messing's performance and admonished the inauthenticity of the book. Two reviews from the New York Stage Review gave the show three stars, describing the show as "half-baked" and critiqued lack of character development. In 2022, Birthday Candles was nominated for two Outer Critics Circle Awards: Outstanding New Broadway Play and Outstanding Actress in a Play (Debra Messing). In addition, Enrico Colantoni and Crystal Finn both won Theatre World Awards. It did not receive any Tony Award nominations.

== Awards and nominations ==
Year	Award	Category	Work	Result	Ref.
2019	American Theatre Critics Association Award	Harold and Mimi Steinberg/ATCA New Play Award	Noah Haidle	Nominated	
2022	Outer Critics Circle Award	Outstanding New Broadway Play		Nominated	
2022	Outer Critics Circle Award	Outstanding Actress in a Play	Debra Messing	Nominated	
2022	Theatre World Awards		Enrico Colantoni	Won	
2022	Theatre World Awards		Crystal Finn	Won	
