= For the People (2018 TV series) =

2018 American legal drama television series

- Genre: Legal drama
- Created by: Paul William Davies
- Starring: Hope Davis; Ben Shenkman; Jasmin Savoy Brown; Susannah Flood; Wesam Keesh; Regé-Jean Page; Ben Rappaport; Britt Robertson; Anna Deavere Smith; Vondie Curtis-Hall; Charles Michael Davis
- Opening theme: "Novocaine for the Soul" by Eels
- Composer: Kris Bowers
- Country of origin: United States
- Original language: English
- No. of seasons: 2
- No. of episodes: 20

Production
- Executive producers: Paul William Davies; Shonda Rhimes; Betsy Beers; Donald Todd; Tom Verica
- Editor: Geofrey Hildrew
- Camera setup: Single-camera
- Running time: 43 minutes
- Production companies: Shondaland; Davies Heavy Industries; ABC Studios

Original release
- Network: ABC
- Release: March 13, 2018 – May 16, 2019

For the People is an American legal drama television series that aired on ABC from March 13, 2018, to May 16, 2019. On May 11, 2018, ABC renewed the series for a second season, which premiered on March 7, 2019.

On May 9, 2019, ABC canceled the series after two seasons.

== Premise ==
Set in the Southern District of New York (SDNY) Federal Court, For the People follows new lawyers—both prosecutors and federal public defenders—as their lives intersect both in and out of the courtroom.

== Cast and characters ==
- Hope Davis as Jill Carlan
- Ben Shenkman as Roger Gunn
- Jasmin Savoy Brown as Allison Adams
- Susannah Flood as Kate Littlejohn
- Wesam Keesh as Jay Simmons
- Regé-Jean Page as Leonard Knox
- Ben Rappaport as Seth Oliver
- Britt Robertson as Sandra Bell
- Anna Deavere Smith as Tina Krissman
- Vondie Curtis-Hall as Judge Nicholas Byrne
- Charles Michael Davis as Ted (season 2)

== Production ==
Britne Oldford and Lyndon Smith were cast in the pilot as Sandra Black and Allison Anderson, respectively. Both roles were later recast with Britt Robertson as Black (renamed Sandra Bell) and Jasmin Savoy Brown as Anderson (renamed Allison Adams). After re-shooting the pilot and shooting the second episode with the new actresses, production was temporarily shut down in September 2017 in order to rewrite existing scripts for the rest of the season to adjust the show to Robertson and Brown's new dynamic. Filming for the second season began on September 23, 2018.

== Episodes ==
Season	Episodes	Originally released	
Season	Episodes	First released	Last released
1	10	March 13, 2018	May 22, 2018
2	10	March 7, 2019	May 16, 2019

=== Season 1 (2018) ===
No. overall	No. in season	Title	Directed by	Written by	Original release date	U.S. viewers (millions)
1	1	"Pilot"	Tom Verica	Paul William Davies	March 13, 2018	3.22
The new federal public defenders and AUSAs are introduced to the US District Court for the Southern District of New York by Chief Judge Nicholas Byrne and Clerk of Court Tina Krissman. FPD Jill Carlan welcomes Sandra Bell, Allison Adams, and Jay Simmons to her office. Chief of the Criminal Division Roger Gunn introduces Kate Littlejohn, Seth Oliver, and Leonard Knox to his department. After Leonard steals Seth's terrorism case against Sandra, Seth is left to go up against his girlfriend Allison on an insider trading case. The lines between their personal and professional lives are blurred when Allison uses a private conversation in court to win the case, leading to Seth being put on probation and leaving Allison. Jay is fooled by his con artist client while going up against procedural guru Kate. Allison asks Sandra to move in with her indefinitely and they decide they are worthy of The Mother Court.
2	2	"Rahowa"	Mark Tinker	Donald Todd	March 20, 2018	2.69
After the disappointing result on his first case, Jay has to step and set aside his personal beliefs to defend a white supremacist who allegedly shot an assemblywoman at a rally. Sandra has trouble adjusting to her new home. At work, she faces off with Tina upon overhearing her turning down a woman with a disabled son who are facing eviction because she filed a document five minutes late. Sandra decides to defend the woman pro bono. Seth is paired with Kate as they have to figure out a way to make a case out of years worth of investigation into prescription-drug fraud. Allison is convinced Seth will move back in, but he thinks otherwise. Leonard feels sidelined after his big win and attempts to impress Roger by parading his mother, senator Knox, around the office.
3	3	"18 Miles Outside of Roanoke"	Tom Verica	Eli Attie	March 27, 2018	3.58
Kate and Sandra go head-to-head on a case about a whistleblower that leaked documents indicating that the NSA abuses medical files to search for undocumented immigrants. In doing so, they discover each other's motivations behind their work drive and why they chose for their respective sides of the justice system. Allison's case is troubled when the judge decides to use an algorithm that evaluates the defendant's recidivism rate, which would disadvantage her client. On his continuous quest to impress Roger, Leonard uses information from a romantic fling working for the Eastern District to make sure a prestigious case lands in the Southern District.
4	4	"The Library Fountain"	Nzingha Stewart	Elizabeth Craft and Sarah Fain	April 3, 2018	2.76
Seth risks his already friable reputation when he pushes to make a case against a company that pollutes the drinking water in his hometown, resulting in several sick children in his former elementary school. The case only gets tougher when Seth has to go up against a condescending attorney from his old firm, who attempts to appease him with a fund that the company set up to aid the victims. Instead, Seth decides to press charges against the company's CEO to gain more money and push reforms. The federal public defenders all work together on the case of Chloe Daniels, who assaulted a postal worker in self-defense. However, as they dig deeper, they find some inconsistencies in her story and start to notice some erratic behavior from their client, which hits close to home for Jill.
5	5	"World's Greatest Judge"	Andrew Bernstein	Zahir McGhee	April 10, 2018	2.67
When Nicholas receives news that a young kid, whom he once sentenced to jail for being present in a house where a raid happened and drugs were found, was beaten to death, he starts questioning the system. Sandra and Seth go up against one another in the case of Rodrigo Puente, a courier who was caught with 57 grams of meth, 7 grams over the limit for a ten-year mandatory minimum sentence. Rattled by the news he received, Nicholas refuses to impose the same sentence to Rodrigo, infuriating Roger. Allison defends a man who was caught counterfeiting wine and finds herself on the receiving end of his charms. Leonard has to make a tough call in deciding if he's going to make a case against a politician who used campaign funds to cover up an affair.
6	6	"Everybody's a Superhero"	P.J. Pesce	Michelle Lirtzman	April 17, 2018	2.04
Allison's winning streak is threatened when she has to go up against a relentless AUSA in a piracy case involving Arturo Marquez, who allegedly stole supplies from a relief ship after a hurricane hit his home country. Leonard and Sandra once again face each other in court over the case of Freddie Morris, who views himself as a superhero named Captain Shadow and was accused of assault when he tried to stop what he believed was a kidnapping. Meanwhile, Kate teams up with ATF agent Anya Ooms to organize a sting to obtain the evidence Anya needs to make her case. While working together, Anya develops an interest in Kate.
7	7	"Have You Met Leonard Knox?"	Daisy von Scherler Mayer	Paul William Davies	May 1, 2018	2.18
Feeling overlooked by his environment, Leonard sets out to find anything to charge Jared Nash with. Jared was present while his roommate raped, beat and eventually killed a young woman, but there is no evidence to link him to the assault and murder. Jay develops a crush on Tina's co-worker while assigned a case of a young tennis player accused of throwing a match in exchange for money. Meanwhile, Sandra and Seth go toe-to-toe over a comedian accused of threatening the President in her quest for gun control and Jill and Roger unwittingly solidify their relationship by going in on Yankees season tickets together.
8	8	"Flippity-Flop"	Nicole Rubio	Karine Rosenthal	May 8, 2018	2.05
Jill and Roger's complicated friendship is tested when they finally square off over a DEA raid that left an inmate clinging to life. Meanwhile, Kate is assigned to an animal smuggling case involving the death of an endangered red panda; and Jay's emotions are thrust into a case when he learns his trusting father was a victim in a pyramid scheme.
9	9	"Extraordinary Circumstances"	Steph Green	Celia Finkelstein	May 15, 2018	1.95
Roger and Jill bond over their failed marriages as they skip a mandatory congress together. While they both feel more than friendship, Jill states it can't work between them because of opposing views. Kate, Leonard, and Seth have to work together to prove that the New York governor is selling a Senate seat. Sandra is confronted with her past when she's assigned to a client who's stuck in the hospital and accused of trafficking drugs. While she attempts to prevent the FBI from doing an illegal scan, she is handcuffed, which triggers an anxiety attack. With Allison busy in court, Jay has to step in and help her.
10	10	"This is What I Wanted to Say"	Tom Verica	Paul William Davies	May 22, 2018	2.37
Sandra defends a hydrologist accused of spying for the Chinese government, but the similarities between this and a former case she lost has her confidence shaken. Meanwhile, Jay faces his fears and goes up against Kate in a case involving a PTA president accused of selling drugs to students; and Allison receives a tempting proposition from her wine-forger client and Leonard reaches out to Kate for advice that culminates with a surprising confession.

=== Season 2 (2019) ===
No. overall	No. in season	Title	Directed by	Written by	Original release date	US viewers (millions)
11	1	"First Inning"	Tom Verica	Paul William Davies	March 7, 2019	3.07
It's all hands on deck in both offices when United States Senator Walter Carson is shot by the police outside his son's house. Sandra, Jill and new investigator Ted defend Julian Sarco, a teenager who inadvertently caused the shooting through swatting. When Jill and Roger are swatted themselves, Roger emotionally amps up the charges against Julian. Leonard realizes he made a mistake by taking the job in Texas and makes his way back to the U.S. Attorney's Office, much to Kate's dismay as Roger re-assigns the swatting case to him following her objections to the added charges. Meanwhile, Jay is tasked with defending a spoiled millennial when her parents turn her in for minor crimes to make her move out.
12	2	"This is America"	Kevin Dowling	Paul William Davies	March 14, 2019	3.26
When an immigrant, a cooperating witness in Leonard's case, is arrested by ICE in the courtroom, his son Ramon starts looking for him around the courthouse. Tina learns of his father's arrest and decides to hide the boy until she has more clarity on his situation, putting her career on the line. When the ICE agents discover the boy, a tense situation emerges involving both groups of lawyers, Chief Judge Nicholas Byrne and US Attorney Douglas Delap. Sandra flies to Arizona to represent Merced Garcia in his bond hearing but fails, forcing Leonard to come up with a creative solution. Meanwhile, Kate feels overlooked by Roger and decides to bring charges against an infamous criminal defense attorney who committed the perfect murder on his wife.
13	3	"Minimum Continuing Legal Education"	Amanda Marsalis	Eli Attie	March 21, 2019	3.07
Seth is looking to move to another division but he needs another trial on his record to make the move. With Leonard and Kate's help, he takes on the case of a Transnistrian diplomatic agent who piles up small crimes under his personal inviolability and immunity. While he manages to convince the Transnistrian ambassador to waive immunity, he gets tangled up in the complicated web of the United States' diplomatic relationships. Sandra and Ted work to defend a man who stole a car and inadvertently kidnapped a baby in the process. Jay's route to court is blocked due to construction and his borrowing Allison's route sets off a chain of superstitious reactions around the office.
14	4	"The Vast, Immovable Object"	Keith Boak	Karine Rosenthal	March 28, 2019	2.96
Jill takes on an incredibly difficult case of a young man accused of strangling a woman. Since he made a false confession after being relentlessly questioned for hours and presented with fabricated evidence, she enlists the help of Ted, Jay and Allison to do the impossible and get the entire case thrown out by shifting blame to another suspect. Meanwhile, Sandra works together with Kate when her client, who is being prosecuted for transporting body parts, agrees to gather evidence to make a case against the illegal network he is participating in. After speaking at a school about their job, Seth asks the teacher for her number.
15	5	"One Big Happy Family"	Claudia Yarmy	Michelle Lirtzman	April 4, 2019	3.07
Sandra and Kate take on the case of a 12-year-old girl wrongfully serving a 4 year sentence in a private, for-profit detention center receiving kick-backs.
16	6	"You Belong Here"	DeMane Davis	Zahir McGhee	April 11, 2019	3.08
Leonard successfully gets the upper hand on litigator Philip Kaws as they negotiate the surrender of his high-profile client; Kaws teaches Leonard about being black in the legal field.
17	7	"The Boxer"	Jim McKay	Kristin Newman	April 18, 2019	2.71
Roger and Jill's relationship is tested when Sandra's client is suspected of murdering someone, and Roger subpoenas Sandra. Seth accidentally steals evidence.
18	8	"Moral Suasion"	Valerie Weiss	Chelsea Grate	May 2, 2019	2.63
Allison defends a man arrested for selling illegal cigarettes and is determined to get him released without bail.
19	9	"Who are we now?"	Daisy Mayer	Alexander Newman-Wise	May 9, 2019	2.31
Sandra and Kate's relationship is put to the test when they go head-to-head over a high-profile bank robbery case. On the defense side, Alison helps Jay as he decides to take an unconventional approach defending their war veteran client. Meanwhile, Tina gives Roger advice about his relationship with Jill, a relationship beginning to show its cracks.
20	10	"A Choice Between Two Things"	Tom Verica	Paul William Davies	May 16, 2019	2.54
Jay's parents are harassed at a polling place, leading to a case with profound ramifications for the U.S. Attorney's offices---and a decision to prosecute the group sending professional political operatives to harass and intimidate immigrant voters. Seth gets the case of his dreams, one that could take down a major crime family. Roger and Jill's relationship reaches a crossroads. The case against voter harassment gets a conviction---and a drastic leadership change, affecting Kate in particular, while Roger finally makes his own drastic decision.

== Reception ==
=== Ratings ===
==== Overall ====
Viewership and ratings per season of For the People
Season	Timeslot (ET)	Episodes	First aired		Last aired		TV season	Viewership rank	Avg. viewers (millions)	18–49 rank
Season	Timeslot (ET)	Episodes	Date	Viewers (millions)	Date	Viewers (millions)	TV season	Viewership rank	Avg. viewers (millions)	18–49 rank
1	Tuesday 10:00 pm	10	March 13, 2018	3.22	May 22, 2018	2.37	2017–18	118	4.19	TBD
2	Thursday 10:00 pm	10	March 7, 2019	3.07	May 16, 2019	2.54	2018–19	106	4.32	TBD

==== Season 1 ====
Viewership and ratings per episode of For the People
No.	Title	Air date	Rating/share (18–49)	Viewers (millions)	DVR (18–49)	DVR viewers (millions)	Total (18–49)	Total viewers (millions)
1	"Pilot"	March 13, 2018	0.8/3	3.22	—N/a	2.39	—N/a	5.61
2	"Rahowa"	March 20, 2018	0.6/2	2.69	0.5	2.28	1.1	4.93
3	"18 Miles from Roanoke"	March 27, 2018	0.9/4	3.58	—N/a	2.16	—N/a	5.67
4	"The Library Fountain"	April 3, 2018	0.8/3	2.76	—N/a	2.10	—N/a	4.86
5	"World's Greatest Judge"	April 10, 2018	0.6/2	2.67	0.5	2.06	1.1	4.73
6	"Everybody's a Superhero"	April 17, 2018	0.5/2	2.04	0.5	1.91	1.0	3.95
7	"Have You Met Leonard Knox?"	May 1, 2018	0.6/3	2.18	0.4	1.80	1.0	3.98
8	"Flippity-Flop"	May 8, 2018	0.5/2	2.05	0.4	1.71	0.9	3.75
9	"Extraordinary Circumstances"	May 15, 2018	0.5/2	1.95	0.4	1.75	0.9	3.70
10	"This is What I Wanted to Say"	May 22, 2018	0.5/2	2.37	0.4	1.68	0.9	4.05

==== Season 2 ====
Viewership and ratings per episode of For the People
No.	Title	Air date	Rating/share (18–49)	Viewers (millions)	DVR (18–49)	DVR viewers (millions)	Total (18–49)	Total viewers (millions)
1	"First Inning"	March 7, 2019	0.5/3	3.07	0.4	2.04	0.9	5.11
2	"This is America"	March 14, 2019	0.5/3	3.26	0.4	1.74	0.9	4.99
3	"Minimum Continuing Legal Education"	March 21, 2019	0.5/3	3.07	0.4	1.85	0.9	4.92
4	"The Vast, Immovable Object"	March 28, 2019	0.6/3	2.96	0.3	1.95	0.9	4.92
5	"One Big Happy Family"	April 4, 2019	0.5/3	3.07	0.4	1.77	0.9	4.83
6	"You Belong Here"	April 11, 2019	0.5/3	3.08	0.3	1.75	0.8	4.83
7	"The Boxer"	April 18, 2019	0.5/3	2.71	0.3	1.68	0.8	4.39
8	"Moral Suasion"	May 2, 2019	0.5/3	2.63	0.4	1.71	0.9	4.34
9	"Who are we now?"	May 9, 2019	0.4/2	2.31	0.4	1.68	0.8	3.99
10	"A Choice Between Two Things"	May 16, 2019	0.4/3	2.54	0.4	1.59	0.8	4.14

=== Critical response ===
On review aggregator Rotten Tomatoes, the series holds an approval rating of 69% based on 16 reviews, with an average rating of 7.7/10. The website's critical consensus reads, "For the People's concept may be all too familiar, but the character depth and clever dialogue help set it apart." On Metacritic, it has a weighted average score of 60 out of 100, based on 9 critics, indicating "mixed or average reviews".
