= Bluff City Law =

2019 American legal drama television series

- Genre: Crime drama; Legal drama
- Created by: Dean Georgaris; Michael Aguilar
- Starring: Jimmy Smits; Caitlin McGee; Barry Sloane; Michael Luwoye; Stony Blyden; Jayne Atkinson; MaameYaa Boafo
- Country of origin: United States
- Original language: English
- No. of seasons: 1
- No. of episodes: 10

Production
- Executive producers: Dean Georgaris; David Janollari; Michael Aguilar
- Camera setup: Single-camera
- Running time: 43 minutes
- Production companies: Dean Georgaris Entertainment 2.0; David Janollari Entertainment; Universal Television

Original release
- Network: NBC
- Release: September 23 – November 25, 2019

Bluff City Law is an American legal drama television series created by Dean Georgaris and Michael Aguilar that aired on NBC from September 23 to November 25, 2019. In June 2020, the series was canceled after one season.

== Premise ==
Set in Memphis, Tennessee, the series depicts a law firm led by attorney Elijah Strait (played by Jimmy Smits) and his daughter, Sydney. The firm handles controversial civil rights cases. This is Smits' third role portraying a lawyer in an NBC network prime-time series, the previous programs being L.A. Law and Outlaw.

== Cast ==
=== Main ===
- Jimmy Smits as Elijah Strait, a civil rights lawyer regarded as one of the most accomplished litigators of his generation.
- Caitlin McGee as Sydney Strait, Elijah's daughter and a former corporate attorney. She returns to her father's firm despite lingering tensions stemming from her departure three years earlier.
- Barry Sloane as Jake Reilly, a senior partner at Strait & Associates.
- Michael Luwoye as Anthony Little, a former cop and partner at Strait & Associates. He and Sydney went to law school together.
- Stony Blyden as Emerson Howe, an introverted paralegal working under Elijah. The pilot episode reveals that he is Sydney's half-brother from an affair her father had, who her father has subsequently adopted.
- Jayne Atkinson as Della Rose Bedford, a gay senior partner at Strait & Associates and Elijah's oldest friend and confidant.
- MaameYaa Boafo as Briana Logan, a seasoned paralegal and investigator who mentors Emerson.
- Josh Kelly as Robbie Ellis, Sydney's ex-husband and the chief of detectives at the Memphis Police Department

== Episodes ==
No.	Title	Directed by	Written by	Original release date	U.S. viewers (millions)
1	"Pilot"	Jessica Yu	Teleplay by : Dean Georgaris; Story by : Michael Aguilar & Dean Georgaris	September 23, 2019	4.61
Following her mother Carolyn's funeral, corporate lawyer Sydney Strait is asked by her father Elijah to rejoin his firm three years after she walked away from it. Sydney initially refuses owing to the bad blood between them, but later agrees and takes a lead role in the firm's latest case as part of a class-action lawsuit against chemical giant Amerifarm for covering up evidence that one of their products, Greencoat, caused cancer. She persuades her father to have his client, Edgar Soriano, file a separate lawsuit in order to get a speedier trial. However, after getting cited for contempt when she loses control of her temper in court, Sydney admits that she doesn't feel she can handle the pressure of losing the case. Elijah talks to her, and the two reconcile. When Amerifarm's legal team discredits all of her witnesses, Sydney locates a doctor who proved Greencoat was dangerous, puts her on the stand, and has her apologize to Edgar in defiance of the judge's instructions; this sways the jury to rule in his favor. Elijah's top lawyer, Jake Reilly, scores a major victory when he persuades a man wrongfully convicted of murder, George Bell, to sign on to an appeal of his case.
2	"You Don't Need a Weatherman"	Adam Davidson	Dean Georgaris	September 30, 2019	4.25
Elijah's friend Emma Sutton is set to lose her farm after being sued by seed manufacturer Terrenial, one of many victims of a scheme to seed private fields with Terrenial's product and then force growers to continue buying it or risk losing their land for patent infringement. The firm takes on Emma's case but soon realizes that there are no good arguments against the company's wrongdoing. After learning that Terrenial has engaged in systemic harassment of farmers, however, they decide to use the RICO approach to paint Terrenial as behaving like a crime syndicate. Sydney comes to terms with Emerson's place at the firm and tells him not to leave for her sake. Anthony helps two feuding brothers realize that their squabbling is putting their family's restaurant at risk, and they reconcile. Terrenial arranges for a key witness to disappear before he can be subpoenaed; in response, Elijah calls their CEO to the stand and gets him to incriminate himself, leading to him being arrested for witness tampering and forcing Terrenial to settle Emma's case. Jake informs George that the DNA evidence used against him was inaccurate, and that his case can finally go to trial.
3	"25 Years to Life"	John Terlesky	Bill Chais	October 7, 2019	3.71
Jake and Elijah prepare for George's retrial, aware that they must both discredit the state's witnesses and George's own taped confession. Sydney and Anthony's former law instructor (Henry Ian Cusick) asks them to file a petition to legally change his age from 62 to 42. Jake visits Connor Markes, the lawyer who originally represented George, for help, but Markes refuses, since he feels George betrayed him by giving up after he spent five years defending him. Sydney admits to Jake that she was adopted by Elijah as a baby, which is why she feels threatened by Emerson. At the trial, Jake eliminates the first two witnesses but is unable to counter the third, the victim's mother, which deeply upsets him. A remorseful Markes provides a clue that leads to evidence exposing the mother's testimony as too unreliable to count against George. Facing potential embarrassment, the DA's office cuts a deal to clear him of all charges. The petition is denied, but the instructor admits he only wanted to use the arguments his old students made for a Supreme Court filing. Sydney accepts that even though she is not Elijah's biological child, she is still his daughter and nothing will ever change that.
4	"Fire in a Crowded Theater"	Mark Polish	Taylor Hamra	October 14, 2019	3.39
A protest against a far-right group ends with a law student, Ashley Webster, being shot and killed; her family hires Elijah to represent them in a $20 million civil suit against the group's founder, Campbell Mathers. Sydney disagrees with her father, believing that he is wrong to challenge the First Amendment, and so he picks Anthony to act as second chair in the trial. Della asks Sydney to help her determine who should be awarded the estate of a deceased friend of her mother's who died without a will. Jake asks Della for advice concerning George, who is against suing the state for full damages despite the fact that he has no other source of income. In court, Elijah and Anthony's arguments are easily parried by Mathers' lawyer, ACLU attorney Rachel Madsen (Wendie Malick). Elijah then loses his composure and attempts to attack Mathers for insulting his wife's memory, resulting in him being found in contempt of court. Sydney decides that the estate will be put into a fund to support a local park. The jury finds in favor of the Webster family, and Rachel speculates that Elijah used a bit of theatrics to win them over. Jake gives George the hard truth, and he agrees to the lawsuit.
5	"When the Levee Breaks"	Andy Wolk	Mike Daniels	October 21, 2019	3.50
A teenage girl named Erika asks the Straits to sue the U.S. government for the climate change that caused her town to be flooded by the Mississippi. After visiting the ramshackle motel where she and her family now live, they decide to take on the case, filing a lawsuit against the Army Corps of Engineers for failing to build a proper levee to protect the town. In court, however, the defense reveals that the Corps are not responsible for the flooding; Sydney winds up adding nearly a dozen new defendants to the suit, drastically lowering its odds of success. Recognizing that they can't afford to let the idealistic Erika down, the firm uses a strategy of alternative liability to shift responsibility to all of the defendants. With Erika providing a short, but heartfelt rebuttal to the defense's closing argument, Sydney is able to force a settlement in which a new system of levees will be built and proper housing provided for the displaced. Della helps an old blues musician get the royalties he gave up years ago to a song credited to his best friend, while also making him confront his unrealized romantic feelings for his deceased friend's wife. Jake asks George to move in with him while he works on proving his innocence.
6	"The All-American"	Matthew Penn	Lisa Morales	October 28, 2019	3.56
Retired football player Marcus Wright hires the firm to sue the state of Tennessee so that he can die with dignity due to his ALS. Taking his pastor's advice, Elijah spends several days with Marcus and his family to help overcome his reluctance to accept such a challenging case. Sydney, meanwhile, decides to sue the organization representing college athletics to force them to pay for Marcus' treatment, a case that requires her and Jake to accept that the case will be decided through arbitration. Della learns that her distant son Eric won't be attending a gala honoring her efforts to advocate for LGBT individuals. Sydney receives formal divorce papers in the mail, strengthening her conviction to get justice for Marcus' family. The arbiter decides in favor of the colleges, but Elijah is able to win Marcus' case by using the Eighth Amendment to argue that forcing him to live against his wishes constitutes cruel and unusual punishment. The firm arranges for a fund to be set up with private donations to help the Wright family cover their mortgage and pay for further treatment. At the gala, Elijah and Sydney share a private moment of remembrance for Carolyn.
7	"American Epidemic"	Catriona McKenzie	Steve Lichtman	November 4, 2019	3.20
Jason Glassman, a prosecutor and former member of the firm, loses his wife Kate to an opioid overdose. Elijah arranges for himself and Sydney to be sworn in as temporary ADAs to prosecute Dr. Lee Pyle, the owner of the clinic responsible for prescribing the opioids. However, the case is quickly thrown into turmoil when it's revealed that Kate actually died from using heroin, meaning Dr. Pyle could not be held responsible without more proof. Briana and Sydney are able to trick one of Pyle's associates into admitting that his clinics have been secretly committing Medicare fraud, forcing Pyle to agree to 15 years in prison and the turnover of all his assets to avoid a longer sentence. Elijah struggles with his feelings when he meets Hannah, a divorcee who is clearly attracted to him. Della tells him that while it may be natural for him to want to honor Carolyn's memory by staying unmarried, he needs to start dating if he ever wants to be happy again. George has an argument with his ex-wife, telling her to forget him and that he doesn't want to deal with the pain of his lost years, leaving Jake worried that he may never be able to truly cope with the challenges faced by former prisoners re-entering society.
8	"Need to Know"	Janice Cooke	Lynn Sternberger	November 11, 2019	3.59
Old wounds are reopened when Elijah agrees to assist Emerson's mother, Army General Virginia Howe, in her efforts to expose an alleged coverup of a faulty geo-positioning system that could potentially harm American lives. During depositions, the plaintiff's chief witness is discredited, so General Howe asks to be put on the stand instead despite the fact that she could be dishonorably discharged and imprisoned for doing so. Before she can, the case is thrown out when the Defense Department intervenes. Sydney is distraught by her father's warm feelings towards his mistress, but nevertheless continues to work on the case. Della forces her elderly father Buzz to sign over the majority stake of his distillery to Eric; in return, he tells her he's revising his will, disowning her for her refusal to work in his company after law school. Emerson discovers that General Ardmore, Howe's superior, failed to disclose his business ties to the system's manufacturer, which Sydney uses to force the case to be reopened. Ardmore is put under investigation, and the system is recalled. Elijah parts ways with Howe, but they agree to keep in touch as best they can. Jake, with Briana's help, finds evidence pointing towards the real killer in George's case.
9	"Ave Maria"	Erica Dunton	Maya Dunbar	November 18, 2019	3.52
The firm takes on the Church when Elijah agrees to his pastor's request to represent Ava Fuller, a former teacher fired for conceiving a child through IVF in violation of Church rules who wants to sue for discrimination. The case divides Elijah and Sydney, as the latter has always been at odds with the idea that faith is something that should be blindly accepted without proof of its existence; Elijah's decision not to use dirty tactics even though he knows the church will also upsets her. Anthony gets involved when Briana's nephew, Maceo, is denied the right to participate in collegiate wrestling for refusing to cut his dreadlocks. By arguing that the rules governing athlete dress and appearance are racially biased, he is able to get them changed in time for Maceo to take part. In court, the defense's argument that the Church needs to be able to set its own rules without state interference proves too much to overcome. The firm loses, but Ava and her husband Blake remain committed to their dream of starting a family and raising their child in the Church. George receives a formal apology from the state of Tennessee along with his compensation, but is clearly uncomfortable with the attention.
10	"Perfect Day"	John Terlesky	Bill Chais	November 25, 2019	3.25
Sydney's former classmate, Layla Hosmani, stalks her out of desperation: her home country of Saudi Arabia is seeking her extradition on false charges of terrorism after she threatened to expose a government official for orchestrating the murder of a foreign diplomat. Sydney has Briana take Layla to a secure location and refuses to disclose it when ordered to do so by a court; she is arrested and told she'll be disbarred for doing so. When Elijah attempts to discredit the witnesses provided by the Saudis to justify their charges, he learns that they have Layla's older brother in custody and will likely have him killed if she does not turn herself in. Layla is ready to do so, but Elijah convinces her otherwise. The team lures two Saudi agents to Layla's hotel before having marshals take them into custody on camera, forcing the judge to dismiss the case and the prosecution to agree to offering Layla and her brother asylum. Sydney is freed and manages to get a client she picked up in jail off of vandalism charges before joining the family for Thanksgiving. In the middle of festivities, Jake is called by police about George. Jakes goes off, thinking that George must have “climbed a tower” as he had done before. But when he arrives on the scene, Jake is informed that George has jumped off a bridge to his death after making amends with his adult son. George leaves a voice message for Jake, thanking him for all he has done for him. Heartbroken, Jake goes to see Sydney for solace and kisses her passionately. But he runs away when he sees Robbie, Sydney’s ex-husband, coming down her stairs.

== Production ==
=== Development ===
On January 10, 2019, it was announced that NBC had given the production a pilot order. The pilot was written by Dean Georgaris who executive produces alongside David Janollari and Michael Aguilar. Production companies involved with the pilot include David Janollari Entertainment and Universal Television. On May 6, 2019, it was announced that the production had been given a series order, together with Sunnyside. A day after that, it was announced that the series would premiere in the fall of 2019 and air on Monday night entry in the 2019–20 television season at 10:00 p.m. The daily newspaper in Memphis, The Commercial Appeal, reported by June that the series would likely be filmed on location in the city, beginning on July 22, for its initial order of 10 episodes. The series premiered on September 23, 2019. On August 8, 2019, NBC ordered six extra scripts, bringing the script order to 16. On October 17, 2019, it was announced that the six extra script order was canceled and the order was reduced back to 10 episodes. On June 15, 2020, NBC officially canceled the series after one season.

=== Casting ===
In February 2019, it was announced that Jimmy Smits, Caitlin McGee, Barry Sloane, and Michael Luwoye had been cast in the pilot's lead roles. Alongside the pilot's order announcement, in March 2019 it was reported that Stony Blyden, Jayne Atkinson and MaameYaa Boafo had joined the cast.

== Release ==
=== Marketing ===
On May 12, 2019, NBC released the first official trailer for the series.

== Reception ==
The review aggregator website Rotten Tomatoes reported a 38% approval rating with an average rating of 6.62/10, based on 13 reviews. The website's critical consensus reads, "Though Bluff City Law's procedural proceedings often feel outdated, fans of Jimmy Smits and Caitlin McGee may find comfort in its familiar beats." Metacritic, which uses a weighted average, assigned a score of 44 out of 100 based on 7 critics, indicating "mixed or average reviews".

=== Ratings ===
Viewership and ratings per episode of Bluff City Law
No.	Title	Air date	Rating/share (18–49)	Viewers (millions)	DVR (18–49)	DVR viewers (millions)	Total (18–49)	Total viewers (millions)
1	"Pilot"	September 23, 2019	0.8/4	4.61	0.4	3.05	1.2	7.66
2	"You Don't Need a Weatherman"	September 30, 2019	0.7/4	4.25	0.3	2.86	1.0	7.11
3	"25 Years to Life"	October 7, 2019	0.6/3	3.71	0.3	2.79	0.9	6.50
4	"Fire in a Crowded Theater"	October 14, 2019	0.5/3	3.39	—N/a	2.73	—N/a	6.12
5	"When the Levee Breaks"	October 21, 2019	0.5/3	3.50	0.3	2.47	0.8	5.96
6	"The All-American"	October 28, 2019	0.5/3	3.56	0.3	2.32	0.8	5.88
7	"American Epidemic"	November 4, 2019	0.5/3	3.20	—N/a	2.45	—N/a	5.66
8	"Need to Know"	November 11, 2019	0.5/3	3.59	—N/a	2.41	—N/a	6.00
9	"Ave Maria"	November 18, 2019	0.5/3	3.52	—N/a	2.36	—N/a	5.88
10	"Perfect Day"	November 25, 2019	0.5/3	3.25	0.3	2.36	0.8	5.60
