= Marie Humbert =

Ghanaian actress

- Born: Geneva, Switzerland
- Education: Cours Florent, Paris / Deakin University, Melbourne
- Occupation: Actress
- Known for: An African City; Potomanto; 40 and Single

Marie Humbert is a Swiss-Ghanaian actress. She received two nominations at the 2016 Ghana Movie Awards for best discovery and best actress, as well as at 10th Africa Movie Academy Awards for best supporting actress. She grew up in six countries with her family. Her father is Swiss French from Geneva and her mother is Ghanaian from Akim Oda, in the Eastern region.

== Career ==
Humbert played "Ebaner" in 40 and Single, winner of the audience award for episodic pilot at the 2018 LA Film Festival and "Susan" in Potomanto, which was her first feature film and got an Africa Movie Academy Award for Best Actress in a Supporting Role nomination and a Ghana Movie Award nomination. She played "Makena" in An African City, describing her role in the film as a reflection of her personal experience of relocating to Ghana a few years ago. She describes Issa Rae and Meryl Streep among others as industry professionals that inspire her. At the 2016 Ghana Movie Awards, Humbert received nominations for best actress in a drama series and discovery of the year categories. The award ceremony held at Kempinski Gold Coast Hotel, Accra in December. Marie recently featured in the 2020 Netflix movie The Set Up.

== Personal life ==
Humbert is of Ghanaian and Swiss origin. She studied theatre arts at Cours Florent in Paris where she received ‘The Lesley Chatterley’ prize for best actress in 2009. Prior to that, She received a Bachelor of Arts from Deakin University in Melbourne, Australia, majoring in drama. She is fluent in English and French.
