= Potomanto =

- Release poster
- Directed by: Shirley Frimpong-Manso
- Screenplay by: Senanu Gbedawo; Shirley Frimpong-Manso
- Produced by: Ken Attoh; Shirley Frimpong-Manso
- Starring: Olu Jacobs; Adjetey Anang; Yvonne Okoro; Christabel Ekeh
- Cinematography: Ken Attoh; John Passah
- Edited by: Nana Ekua Manso
- Production company: Sparrow Production
- Release date: 20 December 2013
- Running time: 120 minutes
- Countries: Ghana; Nigeria

Potomanto (derived from the French word portmanteau) is a 2013 Ghanaian-Nigerian action thriller film directed by Shirley Frimpong-Manso. It stars Olu Jacobs, Yvonne Okoro and Adjetey Anang. It premiered at Silverbird Cinemas, Accra, Ghana, on 20 December 2013.

== Plot ==
An angry ex-police officer, Andane, whose work is to investigate and catch unfaithful partners takes a different turn when he is hired to investigate the wife of a wealthy businessman. He stumbles on a ring of organ harvesters and traffickers who lure young men with a promise to take them abroad. The fiancé of the wealthy man is an undercover agent also undertaking an investigation to nab the organ traffickers. They join force in an attempt to stop the canker that has taken the lives of many of the youth in the community.

== Cast ==
- Olu Jacobs as Bankole
- Adjetey Anang as Adane
- Christabel Ekeh as Afia
- Yvonne Okoro as Alice
- Marie Humbert as Susan
- Mikki Osei Berko as Koranteng
- Senanu Gbedawo as Gyima
- Jason Nwoga as Jarreth
- Aniek An Iyoho as Shina
- Ian Oshodi as Nana
- Elorm Adablah as Coroner
- Kingsley Yamoah as Gabriel
- Fred Kanebi as Desmong
- John Bredu Peasah as Kwesi
- Victoria Johnson
- Edem Agbenyame
- Amos Lamptet as Sakora
- Michael Antwi as Sakora's friend
- Charlotte Appleton as Kathy
- Evelyn Apene as Vincent's Mum
- Jennipha D. Dogbegah as James's Mistress
- Paul Pascal Therson as DSP James Ofori
- Godwin Namboh as Aboagye
- Farouk Moro Haruan as Bankole Security
- Benjamin Zion as Bankole Security
- Julius Caesar as Bar Cleaner
- Elizabeth Anaba as Kelewele Seller
- George Sarpong as Dead Boy 1 in Morgue
- Felix Lomoin Morgue as Dead Boy 2 in Morgue
- Christian Ako Mensah as Kweku
- Anderson Ato Kwamen as Yaw
- Emmett Tumbay as Fight Bookie
- Frank Aidam as Fight Promoter

== Reception ==
Nollywood Reinvented gave the film a 55% rating and praised its storyline and directing. Ghanafilmindustry.com followed with 4 out of 10 stars and concluded that the film was a cheap attempt towards greatness.
