= Eleanor Lloyd =

British theatre producer (born 1980)

Eleanor Rose Lloyd OBE (born 31 January 1980) is a British theatre producer.

== Biography ==
Lloyd was born on 31 January 1980. She studied at the University of Cambridge.

Lloyd began her career producing plays for the Edinburgh Fringe Festival. She was elected as president of the Society of London Theatre in 2020.

Lloyd's theatre productions include Witness For The Prosecution by Agatha Christie (performed at a specially created theatre in London’s County Hall), Shifters by Benedict Lombe, Emilia by Morgan Lloyd Malcolm, Nell Gwynn by Jessica Swale, Vardy v Rooney: The Wagatha Christie Trial by Liv Hennessey, Constellations by Nick Payne, and Handbagged by Moira Buffini. In May 2026, it was announced that she would produce a 2027 London production of Liberation by Bess Wohl.

In 2025, Lloyd was appointed as an Officer of the Order of the British Empire for services to theatre.
