= The Chair (2021 TV series) =

American comedy drama series

- Genre: Comedy drama
- Created by: Amanda Peet & Annie Julia Wyman
- Starring: Sandra Oh; Jay Duplass; Bob Balaban; Nana Mensah; Everly Carganilla; David Morse; Holland Taylor
- Music by: Stephanie Economou
- Country of origin: United States
- Original language: English
- No. of seasons: 1
- No. of episodes: 6

Production
- Executive producers: Amanda Peet; David Benioff; D. B. Weiss; Bernie Caulfield; Daniel Gray Longino; Sandra Oh
- Producers: Tyler Romary; Hameed Shaukat
- Cinematography: Jim Frohna
- Editors: Jay Deuby; Stacy Moon
- Running time: 30 minutes
- Production companies: BLB; Nice work Ravelli

Original release
- Network: Netflix
- Release: August 20, 2021

The Chair is an American comedy drama television series created by Amanda Peet and Annie Julia Wyman. It is set at the fictional Pembroke University, "in what seems like New England". The series was released on Netflix on August 20, 2021. In January 2023, The Chair was canceled after one season.

== Plot ==
Professor Ji-Yoon Kim is the newly appointed chair of the English department at Pembroke University. The first woman chosen for the position, she attempts to ensure the tenure of a young black colleague, negotiate her relationship with her crush, friend, and well-known colleague Bill Dobson, and parent her strong-willed adopted daughter.

== Cast and characters ==
=== Main ===
- Sandra Oh as Ji-Yoon Kim, the new English department chair at Pembroke University
- Jay Duplass as Bill Dobson, Kim's friend and colleague who is a mess after his wife died and his daughter left for college
- Bob Balaban as Elliot Rentz, a senior faculty member of the English department
- Nana Mensah as Yaz McKay, a young faculty member of English department who is up for tenure
- Everly Carganilla as Ju-Hee "Ju Ju" Kim, Ji-Yoon's adopted daughter
- David Morse as Paul Larson, a dean at Pembroke University who oversees the English department
- Holland Taylor as Joan Hambling, a senior faculty member of the English department

=== Recurring ===
- Ji Lee as Habi, Ji-Yoon's father
- Ron Crawford as Professor McHale, a senior faculty member of the English department
- Ella Rubin as Dafna Eisenstadt, an English student
- Mallory Low as Lila, Dobson's teaching assistant
- Jordan Tyson as Capri
- Simone Joy Jones as Joy
- Marcia Debonis as Laurie, the English department chair's assistant
- Bob Stephenson as IT Support technician
- Cliff Chamberlain as Ronny

=== Guest ===
- David Duchovny as himself

== Episodes ==
No.	Title	Directed by	Written by	Original release date
1	"Brilliant Mistake"	Daniel Gray Longino	Amanda Peet & Annie Julia Wyman	August 20, 2021
At the English department meeting, Ji-Yoon talks to her colleagues about the low enrollments in their courses. The dean tells Ji-Yoon she must remove three members from her department due to low enrollment. Ji-Yoon tells Yaz to combine her lecture section with Elliot's, who is supposed to be chairing Yaz's tenure case. In the combined class, Elliot treats Yaz like a teaching assistant rather than a co-professor. Bill becomes intoxicated after his daughter leaves for college, shows up late for his class, and accidentally shows an intimate video of his deceased wife to the students. The next day, Bill again arrives late to class, then uses the Nazi salute in teaching absurdism and fascism. Some students record this gesture on their phones. Ji-Yoon tells Joan she will file a Title IX report because her office was moved to the basement. Joan gets into a verbal argument with the Title IX investigator. At home, Ji-Yoon's father tells her Ju Ju's teacher wants her to go into therapy for a disturbing picture she drew of Ji-Yoon dying.
2	"The Faculty Party"	Daniel Gray Longino	Amanda Peet & Richard E. Robbins	August 20, 2021
Dafna, the student who gave Bill a ride to school in the previous episode, leaves a pie at his doorstep. Ju Ju scares her new babysitter away, forcing Ji-Yoon to leave her with her father Habi so she can attend the faculty party. Ji-Yoon smokes a joint with Bill outside at the party and then has to deliver a speech, where she impulsively announces Yaz will receive the distinguished lectureship this year. Ji-Yoon's father calls to inform her that Ju Ju is missing. When they find her walking in the town, Ju Ju yells that Ji-Yoon is not her real mother and that Habi is not her real grandfather. Ji-Yoon and Bill take Ju Ju bowling while students start circulating the video of Bill doing the Nazi salute to each other. Bill kisses Ji-Yoon, but she stops him from going any further. He comes to her office the next day to ask her to reconsider, and they see students outside Ji-Yoon's window protesting against Bill.
3	"The Town Hall"	Daniel Gray Longino	Amanda Peet & Annie Julia Wyman	August 20, 2021
At the disciplinary proceeding, Bill refuses to write a public apology for the Nazi salute. Instead, he talks to the students, saying he is proud of their dissent. He compares himself to professors who fled Nazi Germany and says the students are misinterpreting what he did. After being asked to apologize, he apologizes for other people's feelings, and the students jeer him and continue to protest. During a discussion about Herman Melville in Yaz and Elliot's class, a student asks about allegations of Melville beating his wife. Elliot refuses to discuss the matter, but Yaz says she will do so in her section. Joan reads her students' poor reviews of her teaching, lights a few reviews on fire, and nearly burns down her office. Ji-Yoon is told the distinguished lecturer will be David Duchovny even though she would ordinarily be the one who chooses the lecturer, and she had already chosen Yaz. Ji-Yoon argues with the dean over the choice, who says the school needs a guest lecturer that will increase enrollment.
4	"Don't Kill Bill"	Daniel Gray Longino	Richard E. Robbins	August 20, 2021
Ji-Yoon tells Bill that he is suspended, not allowed on campus, and must write a formal apology. Bill babysits Ju Ju, who's been suspended from school, and they bond while helping each other write apology letters. Ju Ju says she prefers her nickname over her full name of Ju-Hee, even though she was named after Ji-Yoon's mother. Two students meet with Ji-Yoon, concerned that Yaz may not be given tenure and noting that another non-white professor was denied tenure. Ji-Yoon advocates for Yaz to Elliot, which Elliot pushes back on. Yaz leads animated discussions about Melville and Moby-Dick, with Elliot looking on sadly as an outsider. That evening, Elliot shares his sadness with his wife, uncomfortable with the world he now lives in and his aging body. The dean tells Ji-Yoon that Duchovny will teach Bill's class for the rest of the semester. When Ji-Yoon pushes back, the dean reminds Ji-Yoon she should act more like the chair of the department, not like Bill's peer. Yaz criticizes Ji-Yoon's leadership, saying she should not allow Duchovny to teach and should not express more sympathy for Elliot, who has had tenure for decades, than for her. Joan meets with the IT guy to figure out who is posting negative reviews of her online. Joan confronts the negative reviewer outside the library.
5	"The Last Bus in Town"	Daniel Gray Longino	Jennifer Kim	August 20, 2021
Ji-Yoon is asked to make a statement about Bill's Nazi salute. She is also told to disclose if she is romantically involved with him, which she says she is not. Bill takes pills from his late wife's medicine cabinet. He attends Ju Ju's cousin's birthday party with her, gets drunk, and disrupts the traditional Korean doljanchi ceremony. Habi and his family members take Bill home, where Ju Ju helps him complete a Day of the Dead ritual for his late wife, a tradition that honors Ju Ju's biological Mexican heritage. Ji-Yoon goes to visit David and tells him that she already promised the distinguished lectureship to someone else and that his research work is obsolete. Yaz tells Elliot their classes have been merged because he is on the list for forced retirement. Elliot, Joan, and John think Ji-Yoon is only protecting Bill because of her feelings for him and is not looking after the entire department. Yaz tells Ji-Yoon she has accepted a distinguished lectureship at Yale and is interviewing for a job there, as well.
6	"The Chair"	Daniel Gray Longino	Andrea Troyer	August 20, 2021
Joan, John, and Elliott tell the dean they will be giving a vote of no confidence against Ji-Yoon as chair. Bill's attorney advises he take a settlement and move to New York City. The attorneys for the university tell Ji-Yoon she must speak out against Bill. Dafna goes to Bill's home to ask him to read a draft of a book she has written. He sees a newspaper article criticizing Ji-Yoon and goes to visit her. He asks her to move to Paris with him if he agrees to a settlement. They kiss, and she tells him she needs to fire him. He accuses her of not supporting him, and she accuses him of using his wife's death as an excuse for behaving badly. At the hearing, Ji-Yoon tells Dean Larson that firing Bill will not change the underlying culture at the school. She recuses herself from the panel since she recognizes she is not an impartial party. Bill loses the hearing and is kicked out of the university. At the department meeting, Elliott tells Ji-Yoon about their vote of no confidence. The majority votes against Ji-Yoon and she nominates Joan to replace her as chair. Later, we see Joan happily ensconced in the chair's office. Ji-Yoon, back in her role as professor, is happier. Bill tells Ji-Yoon he refused the settlement offer and will fight to get his job back, because he would rather be a teacher than rich. In the meantime, he offers to babysit Ju Ju to make ends meet.

== Production ==
The Chair was created by Amanda Peet and Annie Julia Wyman. Peet also served as an executive producer, alongside David Benioff, D. B. Weiss, Bernie Caulfield, Daniel Gray Longino, and Sandra Oh. Peet and Annie Julia Wyman co-wrote the pilot episode. Washington & Jefferson College in Washington, Pennsylvania, and the Shadyside campus of Chatham University in Pittsburgh were used to represent Pembroke University, with the Shadyside neighborhood standing in for the town of Pembroke.

== Reception ==
On the review aggregator website Rotten Tomatoes, the series holds an approval rating of 86% based on 69 critic reviews, with an average rating of 6.9/10. The website's critics consensus reads, "The Chair is too short to achieve all of its ambitions, but spot-on observations about academia and a sturdy ensemble led by an empathetic—and hilarious—performance from Sandra Oh ensure it's never less than watchable." Metacritic gave the series a weighted average score of 73 out of 100 based on 33 critic reviews, indicating "generally favorable reviews".

Reviewing the series for USA Today, Kelly Lawler gave the series a rating of three out of four stars and said, "Like most college students, The Chair is incredibly ambitious at what it will achieve in its short time and occasionally falls flat, but overall the series beats the metaphorical curve."

Ben Travers of IndieWire gave the series a B and wrote, "If The Chair were just a collegiate-level romantic-comedy, it would be a delight, boosted further by its brevity, but the show's eagerness to cover more ground is both exciting and a bit much."
