= Imitation of Christ (disambiguation) =

The imitation of Christ (Latin: imitatio Christi) is the Christian ideal of following the example of Jesus.

Imitation of Christ may also refer to:

In religion:

- The Imitation of Christ (Latin: Imitatio Christi), a 15th-century spiritual book by Thomas à Kempis

In art and music:

- Imitation of Christ (film), a 1967 film by Andy Warhol titled after the book by Kempis
- Imitation of Christ (designs), an art project and fashion line created by Tara Subkoff and Matthew Damhave
- "Imitation of Christ", a song on The Psychedelic Furs (album)

== See also ==
- Imitatio dei
- Imitation of Life (disambiguation)
