= Love or Something Like That =

- Film poster
- Directed by: Shirley Frimpong-Manso
- Produced by: Ken Attoh; Shirley Frimpong Manso; Joselyn Dumas
- Starring: John Dumelo; Joselyn Dumas; OC Ukeje; Christabel Ekeh
- Production company: Sparrow Production
- Release date: 17 April 2014 (Ghana)
- Running time: 125 minutes
- Countries: Ghana; Nigeria
- Language: English

Love or Something Like That is a 2014 Ghanaian Nigerian film directed by Shirley Frimpong-Manso. It stars John Dumelo, Joselyn Dumas and OC Ukeje. The film had its London premiere on 28 November 2014 at Odeon Cinema. It received two nominations at the 11th Africa Movie Academy Awards.

== Cast ==
- John Dumelo as Alex Walker
- Joselyn Dumas as Kwarley Mettle
- OC Ukeje as Henry Dominic
- Nana Mensah as Asantewaa
- Christabel Ekeh as Sonia
- Eckow Smith-Asante as Psychologist

== Plot ==
The film tells a story about a newly married couple and the distractions they faced from work shortly after the wedding ceremony. Kwarley Mettle (Joselyn Dumas) had raw sex with her boyfriend, Henry Dominic (OC Ukeje), against her will, two years before getting married. This has led her to insist that her husband, Alex Walker (John Dumelo), use protection each time they share a bed. After Kwarley's hospital admission for treatment, Henry and Kwarley reunite. Recognizing his ex-girlfriend, Henry immediately leaves the hospital without speaking to her. Kwarley checked his patient file and discovered that he suffers from both cancer and AIDS. She located his home address and then paid him a visit. When she arrived, she expressed her disappointment in him.

== Reception ==
The film got negative reviews from 360nobs.com, who drew similarities between the film and Tango with Me, another film directed by Shirley Frimpong-Manso. It noted that in both films, couples were finding it difficult to have sex because of a rape incident. She also noted extra-marital affair as a buffer effect in both films. Tango with Me and Love or Something Like That both ended with the husbands feeling guilty of not being very caring to their spouse. Additionally, Devil in the Detail, another film by this director, was highlighted as having very dialogues as the film during marital advice session to the couple. It also criticized Kwarley being flabbergasted after seeing Henry for the first time despite having his file on her desk. Finally, the film was described as having a faulty premise since it is now very common for couples to have HIV test before getting married in churches, not to mention that the bride was even a medical doctor.

Kolapo Olapoju of YNaija received the film with mixed reviews. It criticized the sex scene in the film, drawing similarity with the ones in Devil in the Detail, describing it as "clumsy and unbelievable" and explaining that John and Joselyn were "clothed from the waist upwards, the lower halves hidden under covered sheets, cavorting and pretending to be having the best sex possible." It faulted the storyline as being unrealistic but praised the acting of Joselyn Dumas, as the major outstanding factor in the film. It also played down the use of Davido's song in the film, as only to draw [Nollywood] market.
