= Whitney White =

American director, actor, and musician

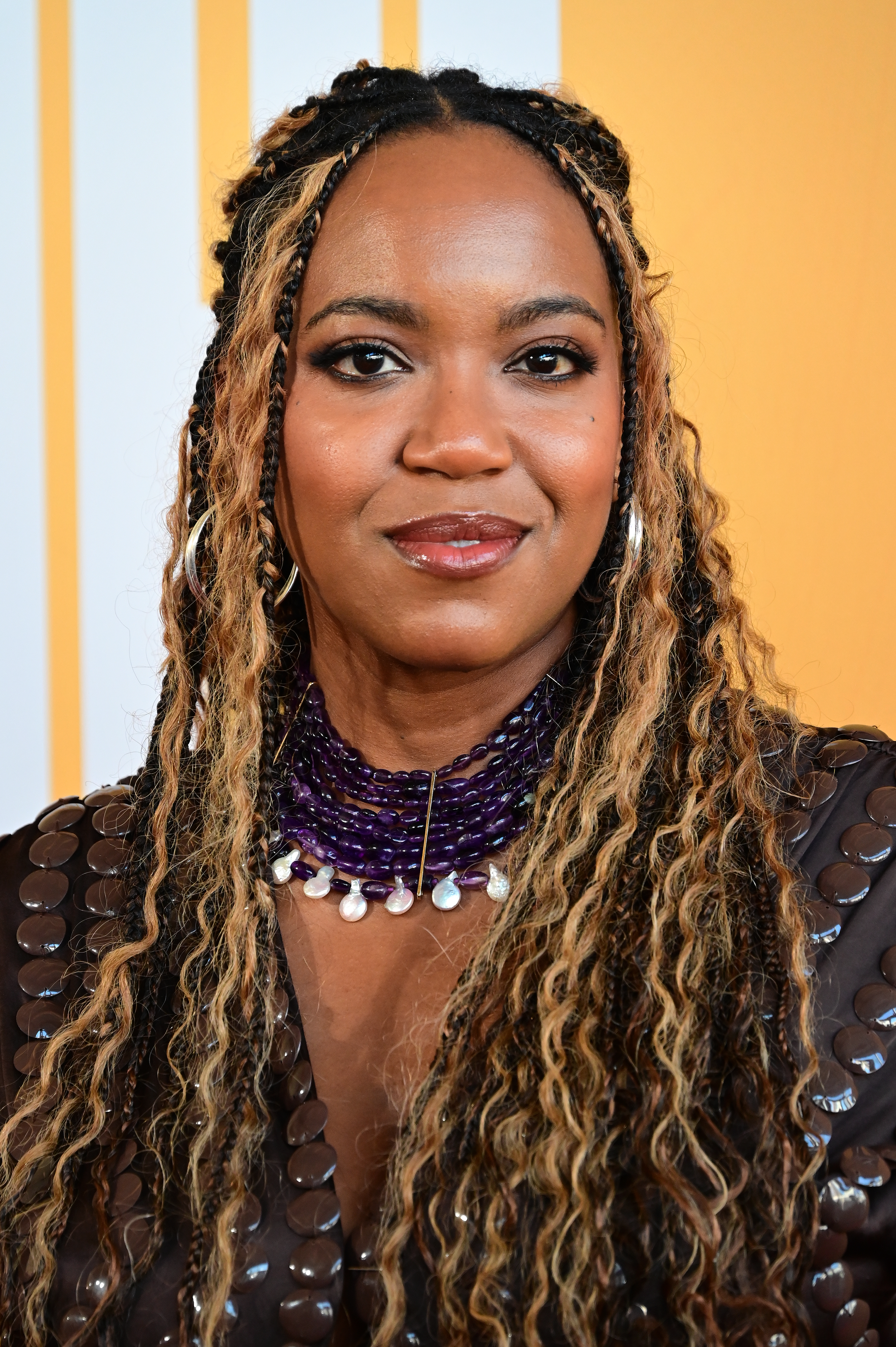
- White in 2026
- Born: 1985 or 1986 (age 40–41)
- Education: Northwestern University (BA); Brown University (MFA)

Whitney White (born 1985 or 1986) is an American director, actor, and musician. Her acting work includes Ocean's 8, Louie, and The Playboy Club. She was nominated for a Tony Award for Best Direction of a Play for Jaja’s African Hair Braiding on Broadway at the 77th Tony Awards in 2024.

== Early life and education ==
Whitney White grew up in Chicago, Illinois. She attended Northwestern University, where she took theater classes, receiving a BA in political science and a certificate in musical theater. While working as an intern on Barack Obama's 2008 presidential campaign, White realized she wanted to pursue the arts. She received a MFA in acting in 2015 from Brown University through their partnership with Trinity Repertory Company.

During White's first year of MFA at Brown University/Trinity Rep, all actor program students had to take one directing class. She received her first opportunity to direct during this class (an adaptation she wrote of Hedda Gabler by Henrik Ibsen), and she felt that all of her skills were being put to use and "that my brain was quiet and focused".

== Career ==
White's directorial debut was in 2018, when she directed Othello for Trinity Repertory, when she fell in love with Shakespeare's work. “I am a Black woman from Chicago, and I always saw my experience reflected in Shakespeare’s world, however, often I would see these great plays live, and these productions wouldn’t represent my experience or even a world I recognized. Yet, when I read Shakespeare, I totally hear my world. I hear my friends and family, and I see the world that I live in. So I wondered how I could unite all these worlds that I love: music, Shakespeare, really high-quality performative art, and entertainment.” Whitney said in an interview with American Repertory Theater. A.R.T commissioned White for five different projects, including Macbeth in Stride, which examined Black female power through the eyes of Lady Macbeth, played by White, and was staged as a rock concert.

In November of the same year White directed What to Send Up When It Goes Down by Aleshea Harris at A.R.T./New York Theatres. The cast included Alana Raquel Bowers, Rachel Christopher, Ugo Chukwu, Kambi Gathesha, Naomi Lorrain, Denise Manning, Javon Q. Minter and Beau Thom.

White won the Obie Award in 2020 for directing Our Dear Dead Druglord at the WP Theater.

In 2023, it was announced that White was attached to direct a stage musical adaptation of The Queen's Gambit.

White is set to direct Lynn Nottage's adaptation of Imitation of Life, with music and lyrics by John Legend, at The Shed in New York in November, 2026.

== Works ==
=== Director ===
Year	Title	Credit	Venue
2017	Marvin's Room	Assistant Director	American Airlines Theatre, Broadway
2018	What to Send Up When It Goes Down	Director	
2019	for all the women who thought they were Mad	Director	Soho Repertory Theatre, Off-Broadway
2019	Our Dear Dead Druglord	Director	WP Theater, Off-Broadway
2020	What to Send Up When It Goes Down	Director	The Public Theater, Off-Broadway
2022	On Sugarland	Director	New York Theatre Workshop, Off-Broadway
2022	Soft	Director	MCC Theater, Off-Broadway
2022	The Most Spectacularly Lamentable Trial of Miz Martha Washington	Director	Steppenwolf Theatre Company, Chicago
2023	The Secret Life of Bees	Director	Almeida Theatre, Off West End
2023	Jaja's African Hair Braiding	Director	Samuel J. Friedman Theatre, Broadway
2024	Jordans	Director	The Public Theater, Off-Broadway
2024	Walden	Director	Second Stage Tony Kiser Theater, Off-Broadway
2025	Liberation	Director	Roundabout at Laura Pels Theatre, Off-Broadway
2025	The Last Five Years	Director	Hudson Theatre, Broadway
2025	Saturday Church	Director	New York Theatre Workshop, Off-Broadway
2025	Liberation	Director	James Earl Jones Theatre, Broadway
2026	The Whoopi Monologues	Director	Mitzi E. Newhouse Theatre, Off-Broadway
2026	School Girls; Or, The African Mean Girls Play	Director	Samuel J. Friedman Theatre, Broadway

=== Filmography ===
Year	Title	Role	Notes
2011	The Playboy Club	Ikette, Hefette	TV Series (2 episodes)
2012	Louie	Stripper	TV Series (1 episode)
2018	Ocean's 8	Cynthia	
2022	Single Drunk Female	Angeline	TV Series (2 episodes)

== Awards and nominations ==
Year	Award	Category	Work	Result
2018	Susan Stroman Award	Direction	n/a	Won
2020	Obie Award	Direction	Our Dear Dead Druglord	Won
2022	Drama Desk Award	Outstanding Director of a Play	On Sugarland	Nominated
2022	Lucille Lortel Award	Outstanding Director	On Sugarland	Nominated
2023	Lucille Lortel Award	Outstanding Director	Soft	Nominated
2024	Tony Awards	Best Direction of a Play	Jaja's African Hair Braiding	Nominated
2024	Drama League Awards	Outstanding Direction of a Play	Jaja's African Hair Braiding	Nominated
2025	Drama League Awards	Founders Award for Excellence in Directing		Honored
2025	Lucille Lortel Award	Outstanding Director	Liberation	Nominated
2025	Drama Desk Award	Outstanding Director of a Play	Liberation	Nominated
2026	Tony Awards	Best Direction of a Play	Liberation	Nominated
2026	Obie Award	Sustained Achievement in Direction	Walden and Liberation	Won

== Personal life ==
White lives in Brooklyn, New York City.
