= Nicole Amarteifio =

Ghanaian film director, producer, and screenwriter

- Born: 1982 (age 43–44)
- Education: Brandeis University; Georgetown University
- Occupations: Film director, producer, screenwriter
- Years active: 2012–present

Nicole Amarteifio (born 1982) is a Ghanaian film director, producer, and screenwriter.

== Biography ==
Amarteifio was born in Ghana in 1982 but moved to London as a three-month-old due to the military coups in her country, living in England for six years. Her grandfather, a white district commissioner, married her grandmother in Ghana in 1945. She later moved with her family to Scarsdale, New York, but vacationed in Ghana every year.

While attending Scarsdale Middle School, a classmate reportedly was heard suggesting blowing up Africa in order to solve the HIV problem.

Amarteifio's parents moved back to Ghana in 1997. She earned a bachelor's degree in African and Afro-American studies from Brandeis University in 2004.

After graduation, she got a job in Washington, D.C. as a consultant for African economic development at The Whitaker Group, working for Rosa Whitaker.

In 2006, Amarteifio moved to Accra, Ghana, to work in economic development at the African Development Foundation. Shortly after her move to Africa, she had the idea to make a show like Sex and the City in Accra.

Amarteifio returned to the United States to attend Georgetown University and obtained a master's degree in corporate communications in 2010. At Georgetown, she studied under Mike Long, who encouraged her interest in screenwriting.

Amarteifio found a job at the World Bank as the first-ever social-media strategist in Accra. Several months after returning to Ghana, she began introducing her idea to television professionals, who declined to take up the project but encouraged her to learn how to write a show.

Amarteifio created a budget and realized she only needed enough money to get started rather than to produce a full season. To learn about producing, she followed the work of multi-media producers and enrolled in a community college course. Amarteifio discovered scripts of Sex and the City episodes and related shows online, and used them as a template for her writing, as well as stories from her friends throughout Africa. She found actors at casting calls, and contacted an old school classmate, Maame Adjei, to play the part of Zainab. Adjei went to school in Connecticut with Nana Mensah, whom Amarteifio chose for the Sadé character.

Using a local Ghanaian film crew, Amarteifio largely shot her show on weekends and nights do not conflict with her work in the World Bank.

The first season of her show, An African City, was released on YouTube in March 2014. It follows the lives of five friends who had moved back to Africa after living abroad and navigate love, careers, and nightlife in the Ghanaian capital, with frank discussions about sexuality. Amarteifio aimed to create conversations about what is African, and to dispel taboos. The series was criticized for representing elitist characters who do not have much in common with most African women.

Amarteifio dispelled this criticism, questioning the idea of the average African woman. The second season of the show came out in 2016. Her second TV series, a political thriller called The Republic, was also released in 2016, based on real-life cases in Accra.

Amarteifio has been called "the Shonda Rhimes of Ghana." She was named one of OkayAfrica 100 Women in 2018. Her first feature film, Before the Vows, premiered at the Seattle International Film Festival in 2018. A romantic comedy, it follows the relationship between Afua and Nii as they contemplate marriage.

== Filmography ==
- 2012: Praying for Daylight (short film; writer and co-producer)
- 2014–present: An African City (TV series; writer, co-director, producer)
- 2016: The Republic (TV series; writer, director, producer)
- 2018: Before the Vows (writer, director, producer)
- 2020: Indie Nation (as herself)
