= Imitation of Life =

The imitation of life in art is called mimesis.

Imitation of Life may also refer to:

== Literature and film ==
- Imitation of Life (novel), a 1933 novel by Fannie Hurst
  - Imitation of Life (1934 film), an adaptation of the novel starring Claudette Colbert
  - Imitation of Life (1959 film), an adaptation of the novel starring Lana Turner

== Music ==
- Imitation of Life, a 1981 album by Steve Beresford and Tristan Honsinger
- "Imitation of Life", a song by Anthrax from the 1987 album Among the Living
- "Imitation of Life" (song), a 2001 song by R.E.M. from Reveal
- Imitations of Life, a 2004 album by the R&B group H-Town

== See also ==
- Imitation of Christ (disambiguation)
