= School Girl (film) =

School Girls (aka The Schoolgirl)
- Directed by: Paul Gerber
- Starring: Debra Allen; George S. McDonald
- Distributed by: Caballero Home Video
- Release date: 1971
- Running time: 87 minutes
- Country: United States
- Language: English

School Girl (also known as The Schoolgirl) is a 1971 pornographic film directed by Paul David Gerber (also known as David Reberg), and was mentioned in the "Guilty Pleasures" section of Time magazine's list of "All-Time 100 best films". The film stars Debra Allen and George S. MacDonald of Behind the Green Door.

== Premise ==
A college coed researches a sex subculture by answering ads in the college's underground newspaper.

== Cast ==
- Debra Allen
- Susan Davis
- Sunny Waters
- Eric Humphrey
- George S. McDonald (as George Allen)

== Recognition ==
Critic Richard Corliss wrote in 1978 that "All critics should have a sex movie among their guilty pleasures", and expanded that his favorite was School Girl because it was "one of the few porn comedies to poke holes in the inanities of the genre without letting the air escape from the spectator's libido". The film was later listed among Corliss's "Guilty Pleasures" as a postscript to Time Magazine's list of "All-Time 100 best films." In his essay, Corliss described the film as a "mini-masterpiece", offering that the film was "a funny, telling comment on how directors bring an audience's gamiest desires to life, and on how power helps define any human relationship." Corliss later wrote that the film was the "friendliest, most naturalistic porno I know" and that it was "a lovely, and hot, demonstration of the thesis that sex is power".

== Controversy ==
The film was the subject of litigation, being declared obscene and its distribution in violation of 18 U.S.C. §§ 371 and 1462 (1976). Originally found so in 1973 by a federal grand jury in Memphis, Tennessee, the finding was appealed in 1978 and confirmed in 1979.
