= School Girls; Or, the African Mean Girls Play =

2017 play by Jocelyn Bioh

- 2026 Broadway production poster
- Original language: English
- Written by: Jocelyn Bioh
- Characters: Paulina; Ericka; Headmistress Francis; Ama; Mercy; Gifty; Nana; Eloise
- Genre: Comedy

Premiere
- Date: November 19, 2017
- Place: MCC Theater

School Girls; Or, the African Mean Girls Play is a comedic stage play written by American playwright Jocelyn Bioh. The play debuted Off-Broadway in 2017 at the MCC Theater, and premiered on Broadway in September 2026.

== Synopsis ==
The play takes place in Ghana at Aburi Girls Boarding School in 1986. Paulina Sarpong, the school's queen bee, sets her sights on the Miss Universe pageant. A new American student, Ericka, joins the school and enters the pageant. This creates a rivalry, leading up to a fight when the pageant recruiter arrives to the school.

The play is described as a commentary on "universal similarities – and glaring differences – of teenage girls across the globe."

== Production history ==
=== 2017 Off-Broadway premiere ===
School Girls; Or, the African Mean Girls Play premiered off-Broadway at the MCC Theater, with previews beginning November 2, 2017, and an official opening on November 19, 2017. Rebecca Taichman served as director of the production, which starred Nabiyah Be as Ericka, MaameYaa Boafo as Paulina, Paige Gilbert as Gifty, Zainab Jah as Eloise, Nike Kadri as Ama, Abena Mensah-Bonsu as Nana, Mirirai Sithole as Mercy and Myra Lucretia Taylor as Headmistress Francis. The limited run concluded on December 10, 2017. The show received acclaim from critics, who praised Bioh's writing and said "the nasty-teen comedy genre emerges wonderfully refreshed and even deepened by its immersion in a world it never considered."

The off-Broadway production was nominated for two Outer Critics Circle Awards, with Bioh winning the Circle's John Gassner Award, four Lucille Lortel Awards, winning as Outstanding Play, and won a Drama Desk Special Award for Outstanding Ensemble.

The production was remounted at Center Theatre Group in Los Angeles from September 2 to September 30, 2018. It was staged again off-Broadway at MCC Theater from October 16 to December 9, 2018. Most of the original cast returned with Latoya Edwards as Ama, Joanna A. Jones as Ericka, and Zenzi Williams as Eloise. The remounted production was filmed and broadcast on PBS Theater Close-Up.

=== 2026 Broadway production ===
Manhattan Theatre Club's Broadway production began previews on September 8, 2026 at the Samuel J. Friedman Theatre, with an opening night on September 28. Directed by Whitney White, the production stars Denée Benton as Paulina, Jasmine Amy Rogers as Ericka, with Heather Simms as Headmistress Francis, Patina Miller as Eloise, Lucia Aremu as Ama, Jordan Rice as Mercy, Nia Otchere-Sarfo as Gifty and Erin Morton as Nana. It was announced that playwright Jocelyn Bioh would take over for the role of Eloise from October 9-11 due to Miller's pre-planned absence.

=== Regional productions ===
Interior of the Samuel J. Friedman Theatre before a showing of School Girls, October 2026

The play has been performed more than 75 times at regional theatres across the United States.

== Cast and characters ==
Character	Off-Broadway	Broadway
Character	2017	2026
Paulina Sarpong	MaameYaa Boafo	Denée Benton
Ericka Boafo	Nabiyah Be	Jasmine Amy Rogers
Headmistress Francis	Myra Lucretia Taylor	Heather Alicia Simms
Eloise Amponsah	Zainab Jah	Patina Miller
Ama	Nike Kadri	Lucia Aremu
Mercy	Mirirai Sithole	Jordan Rice
Gifty	Paige Gilbert	Nia Otchere-Sarfo
Nana	Abena Mensah-Bonsu	Erin Morton

=== Notable Replacements ===
==== Broadway (2026) ====
- Eloise: Jocelyn Bioh

== Accolades ==
=== 2017 Off-Broadway production ===
Year	Award	Category	Nominee	Result	Ref.
2018	Drama Desk Award	Ensemble Award	MaameYaa Boafo, Nabiyah Be, Myra Lucretia Taylor, Zainab Jah, Nike Kadri, Mirirai Sithole, Paige Gilbert, Abena Mensah-Bonsu	Won	
2018	Outer Critics Circle Award	John Gassner Award	Jocelyn Bioh	Won	
2018	Outer Critics Circle Award	Outstanding Actress in a Play	MaameYaa Boafo	Nominated	
2018	Lucille Lortel Award	Outstanding Play		Won	
2018	Lucille Lortel Award	Outstanding Lead Actress in a Play	MaameYaa Boafo	Nominated	
2018	Lucille Lortel Award	Outstanding Featured Actress in a Play	Mirirai Sithole	Nominated	
2018	Lucille Lortel Award	Outstanding Costume Design	Dede M. Ayite	Won	
2018	Drama League Award	Outstanding Production of a Play		Nominated	
2018	Drama League Award	Distinguished Performance	MaameYaa Boafo	Nominated	
