= Drama Desk Award for Outstanding Direction of a Play =

American theatre award

- Awarded for: Outstanding Direction of a Play
- Location: New York City
- Country: United States
- Presented by: Drama Desk
- First award: 1975
- Currently held by: Joe Mantello for Death of a Salesman (2026)
- Website: dramadesk.org (defunct)

The Drama Desk Award for Outstanding Direction of a Play is an annual award presented by Drama Desk in recognition of achievements by theatre directors across collective Broadway, off-Broadway, and off-off-Broadway productions in New York City, United States. The awards were established in 1955, with the Drama Desk Award for Outstanding Director being presented each year to a director from any play or musical production. Starting in 1975, the singular director's award was replaced by separate play and musical categories.

Jack O'Brien and Jerry Zaks hold the record for most wins in the category, with three each. Daniel J. Sullivan holds the record for most nominations, with seven, followed closely by Joe Mantello with six and Mike Nichols with five. Mary Zimmerman was the first female winner, receiving the award in 2002 for Metamorphoses. Since her win, Anna D. Shapiro, Pam MacKinnon, Marianne Elliott, Rebecca Frecknall and current winner Danya Taymor have also won the award as female directors.

== Winners and nominees ==
Key

and bold indicates the winner.

=== 1970s ===
Year	Director	Production
1975
1975	**John Dexter**	**Equus**
1975	Frank Dunlop	Sherlock Holmes
1975	Athol Fugard	Sizwe Banzi Is Dead
1975	Athol Fugard	The Island
1975	Peter H. Hunt	Goodtime Charlie
1975	Ron Link	Women Behind Bars
1975	Gene Saks	Same Time, Next Year
1976
1976	**Ellis Rabb**	**The Royal Family**
1976	Edward Albee	Who's Afraid of Virginia Woolf?
1976	Arvin Brown	Dual Bill
1976	Mike Nichols	Streamers
1976	Stephen Porter	They Knew What They Wanted
1976	Tom Signorelli	Lamppost Reunion
1977
1977	**Mike Nichols**	**Comedians**
1977	**Alan Schneider**	**A Texas Trilogy**
1977	Frank Dunlop	The New York Idea
1977	Tony Giordano	G.R. Point
1977	Ulu Grosbard	American Buffalo
1977	Oz Scott	For Colored Girls Who Have Considered Suicide When the Rainbow Is Enuf
1978
1978	**Melvin Bernhardt**	**Da**
1978	Peter Bennett	Dracula
1978	Joseph Chaikin	The Dybbuk
1978	Mike Nichols	The Gin Game
1978	Steven Robman	Uncommon Women
1978	Garland Wright	K
1979
1979	**Jack Hofsiss**	**The Elephant Man**
1979	Alan Ayckbourn	Bedroom Farce
1979	John Madden	Wings
1979	Stephen Porter	Man and Superman
1979	Horacena J. Taylor	Nevis Mt. Dew
1979	Ted Weiant	The Miracle Worker

=== 1980s ===
Year	Director	Production
1980
1980	**Vivian Matalon**	**Morning's at Seven**
1980	Kevin Conway	Mecca
1980	Gordon Davidson	Children of a Lesser God
1980	Lynne Gannaway and Robert Kalfin	Strider
1980	Marshall W. Mason	Talley's Folly
1980	Alan Schneider	Loose Ends
1981
1981	**Peter Hall**	**Amadeus**
1981	Melvin Bernhardt	Crimes of the Heart
1981	Geraldine Fitzgerald	Mass Appeal
1981	Douglas Seale	The Winslow Boy
1982
1982	**Tommy Tune**	**Cloud Nine**
1982	Athol Fugard	"Master Harold"...and the Boys
1982	Jacques Levy	Potsdam Quartet
1982	John Tillinger	Entertaining Mr Sloane
1982	Douglas Turner Ward	A Soldier's Play
1983
1983	**Trevor Nunn**	**All's Well That Ends Well**
1983	Robert Allan Ackerman	Extremities
1983	Michael Bennett	Third Street
1983	George C. Scott	Present Laughter
1983	Arthur Sherman	The Caine Mutiny Court-Martial
1983	Gary Sinise	True West
1984
1984	**Michael Blakemore**	**Noises Off**
1984	Lee Grant	A Private View
1984	Gerald Gutierrez	Isn't It Romantic
1984	Terry Kinney	And a Nightingale Sang
1984	Gregory Mosher	Glengarry Glen Ross
1984	Mike Nichols	The Real Thing
1985
1985	**John Malkovich**	**Balm in Gilead**
1985	Ron Lagomarsino	Digby
1985	Marshall W. Mason	As Is
1985	Gene Saks	Biloxi Blues
1985	Claudia Weill	Found a Peanut
1986
1986	**Jerry Zaks**	**The Marriage of Bette & Boo**
1986	**Jerry Zaks**	**The House of Blue Leaves**
1986	Liviu Ciulei	Hamlet
1986	Jonathan Miller	Long Day's Journey into Night
1986	Mary B. Robinson	Lemon Sky
1986	Gary Sinise	Orphans
1986	John Tillinger	It's Only a Play
1986	John Tillinger	Loot
1987
1987	**Howard Davies**	**Les Liaisons Dangereuses**
1987	Simon Gray and Michael McGuire	The Common Pursuit
1987	Ron Lagomarsino	Driving Miss Daisy
1987	Lloyd Richards	Fences
1987	Carole Rothman	Coastal Disturbances
1987	Gene Saks	Broadway Bound
1988
1988	**John Dexter**	**M. Butterfly**
1988	W. H. Macy	Boys' Life
1988	Lynne Meadow	Woman in Mind
1988	Gregory Mosher	Speed-the-Plow
1988	Lloyd Richards	Joe Turner's Come and Gone
1989
1989	**Jerry Zaks**	**Lend Me a Tenor**
1989	Simon Callow	Shirley Valentine
1989	Robin Lefèvre	Aristocrats
1989	Jack O'Brien	The Cocktail Hour
1989	Norman René	Reckless
1989	Daniel Sullivan	The Heidi Chronicles

=== 1990s ===
Year	Director	Production
1990
1990	**Frank Galati**	**The Grapes of Wrath**
1990	Roger Michell	Some Americans Abroad
1990	Adrian Noble	The Art of Success
1990	Norman René	Prelude to a Kiss
1990	Lloyd Richards	The Piano Lesson
1991
1991	**Jerry Zaks**	**Six Degrees of Separation**
1991	Michael Greif	Machinal
1991	Richard Jones	La Bête
1991	Kevin Kline	Hamlet
1992
1992	**Patrick Mason**	**Dancing at Lughnasa**
1992	JoAnne Akalaitis	'Tis Pity She's a Whore
1992	Michael Bloom	Sight Unseen
1992	David Chambers	Search and Destroy
1992	Mark Wing-Davey	Mad Forest
1993
1993	**George C. Wolfe**	**Angels in America: Millennium Approaches**
1993	Christopher Ashley	Jeffrey
1993	Adrian Hall	As You Like It
1993	Ariane Mnouchkine	Les Atrides
1993	Daniel Sullivan	The Sisters Rosensweig
1994
1994	**Stephen Daldry**	**An Inspector Calls**
1994	JoAnne Akalaitis	In the Summer House
1994	Jonathan Kent	Medea
1994	Mark Wing-Davey	The Lights
1994	Mary Zimmerman	Arabian Nights
1995
1995	**Gerald Gutierrez**	**The Heiress**
1995	Declan Donnellan	As You Like It
1995	David Esbjornson	Iphigenia and Other Daughters
1995	Emily Mann	Having Our Say
1995	Joe Mantello	Love! Valour! Compassion!
1995	Sean Mathias	Indiscretions
1996
1996	**Gerald Gutierrez**	**A Delicate Balance**
1996	Scott Elliott	The Monogamist
1996	Doug Hughes	The Grey Zone
1996	Adrian Noble	A Midsummer Night's Dream
1996	Lloyd Richards	Seven Guitars
1996	George C. Wolfe	The Tempest
1997
1997	**Mark Brokaw**	**How I Learned to Drive**
1997	Robert La Page	The Seven Streams of the River Ota
1997	Lynne Meadow	Nine Armenians
1997	Deborah Warner	The Waste Land
1997	Mark Wing-Davey	The Skriker
1998
1998	**Michael Mayer**	**A View from the Bridge**
1998	**Michael Mayer**	**Side Man**
1998	Scott Elliott	Goose-Pimples
1998	James Houghton	The American Clock
1998	Garry Hynes	The Beauty Queen of Leenane
1998	Joe Mantello	Mizlansky/Zilinsky or 'Schmucks'
1998	Simon McBurney	The Chairs
1999
1999	**Trevor Nunn**	**Not About Nightingales**
1999	Derek Anson Jones	Wit
1999	Howard Davies	The Iceman Cometh
1999	Robert Falls	Death of a Salesman
1999	Patrick Marber	Closer
1999	Nicholas Martin	Betty's Summer Vacation

=== 2000s ===
Year	Director	Production
2000
2000	**Michael Blakemore**	**Copenhagen**
2000	Thomas Hulce and Jane Jones	The Cider House Rules (Part One)
2000	James Lapine	Dirty Blonde
2000	Michael Mayer	Uncle Vanya
2000	Marion McClinton	Jitney
2000	Daniel J. Sullivan	Dinner with Friends
2001
2001	**Jack O'Brien**	**The Invention of Love**
2001	Mark Brokaw	Lobby Hero
2001	Michael Greif	Dogeaters
2001	Philip Seymour Hoffman	Jesus Hopped the 'A' Train
2001	Jonathan Kent	Richard II
2001	Matthew Warchus	The Unexpected Man
2002
2002	**Mary Zimmerman**	**Metamorphoses**
2002	Howard Davies	Private Lives
2002	Richard Eyre	The Crucible
2002	Carl Forsman	The Voice of the Turtle
2002	Neil LaBute	The Shape of Things
2002	Bartlett Sher	Cymbeline
2003
2003	**Robert Falls**	**Long Day's Journey into Night**
2003	Philip Seymour Hoffman	Our Lady of 121st Street
2003	Joe Mantello	Take Me Out
2003	Sam Mendes	Twelfth Night
2003	Sam Mendes	Uncle Vanya
2003	Deborah Warner	Medea
2004
2004	**Jack O'Brien**	**Henry IV**
2004	Hilary Adams	Moby Dick
2004	Dexter Bullard	Bug
2004	Edward Hall	A Midsummer Night's Dream
2004	Moisés Kaufman	I Am My Own Wife
2004	Kenny Leon	A Raisin in the Sun
2005
2005	**Doug Hughes**	**Doubt**
2005	Josh Carlebach	Frankenstein
2005	Scott Elliott	Hurlyburly
2005	Scott Ellis	Twelve Angry Men
2005	Edward Hall	Rose Rage
2005	Joe Mantello	Glengarry Glen Ross
2006
2006	**Nicholas Hytner**	**The History Boys**
2006	Alan Ayckbourn	Private Fears in Public Places
2006	Gisela Cardenas	Agamemnon
2006	Daniel J. Sullivan	Stuff Happens
2006	Robert Wilson	Peer Gynt
2006	Jerry Zaks	The Caine Mutiny Court-Martial
2007
2007	**Jack O'Brien**	**The Coast of Utopia**
2007	Declan Donnellan	Twelfth Night
2007	Michael Grandage	Frost/Nixon
2007	Doug Hughes	Inherit the Wind
2007	Ciaran O'Reilly	The Hairy Ape
2007	Tom Ridgely	Marco Millions
2008
2008	**Anna D. Shapiro**	**August: Osage County**
2008	David Schweizer	Horizon
2008	Leigh Silverman	From Up Here
2008	Jonathan Silverstein	The Dining Room
2008	Matthew Warchus	Boeing-Boeing
2008	Deborah Warner	Happy Days
2009
2009	**Matthew Warchus**	**The Norman Conquests**
2009	Sarah Benson	Blasted
2009	Michael Blakemore	Blithe Spirit
2009	Garry Hynes	The Cripple of Inishmaan
2009	Terry Kinney	reasons to be pretty
2009	Kate Whoriskey	Ruined

=== 2010s ===
Year	Director	Production
2010
2010	**Michael Grandage**	**Red**
2010	Jonathan Bank	So Help Me God!
2010	Jack Cummings III	The Boys in the Band
2010	Sam Gold	Circle Mirror Transformation
2010	Michael Grandage	Hamlet
2010	Ethan Hawke	A Lie of the Mind
2011
2011	**Joel Grey and George C. Wolfe**	**The Normal Heart**
2011	Trip Cullman	A Small Fire
2011	Moisés Kaufman	Bengal Tiger at the Baghdad Zoo
2011	Davis McCallum	A Bright New Boise
2011	Daniel J. Sullivan	The Merchant of Venice
2011	Kirjan Waage and Gwendolyn Warnock	Baby Universe
2012
2012	**Mike Nichols**	**Death of a Salesman**
2012	Jo Bonney	By the Way, Meet Vera Stark
2012	David Cromer	Tribes
2012	Ed Sylvanus Iskandar	These Seven Sicknesses
2012	Sam Mendes	Richard III
2012	Tony Speciale	Unnatural Acts
2013
2013	**Pam MacKinnon**	**Who's Afraid of Virginia Woolf?**
2013	Lear deBessonet	The Good Person of Szechwan
2013	Sam Gold	Uncle Vanya
2013	Ed Sylvanus Iskandar	Restoration Comedy
2013	Lynne Meadow	The Assembled Parties
2013	Ruben Santiago-Hudson	The Piano Lesson
2014
2014	**Tim Carroll**	**Twelfth Night**
2014	Joe Calarco	A Christmas Carol
2014	Thomas Kail	Family Furniture
2014	Bill Rauch	All the Way
2014	Anna D. Shapiro	Domesticated
2014	Julie Taymor	A Midsummer Night's Dream
2015
2015	**Marianne Elliott**	**The Curious Incident of the Dog in the Night-Time**
2015	Jeremy Herrin	Wolf Hall Parts One & Two
2015	Anne Kauffman	You Got Older
2015	Lila Neugebauer	The Wayside Motor Inn
2015	Austin Pendleton	Between Riverside and Crazy
2015	Joe Tantalo	Deliverance
2015	John Tiffany	Let the Right One In
2016
2016	**Ivo van Hove**	**A View from the Bridge**
2016	Rachel Chavkin	The Royale
2016	Sam Gold	John
2016	Rupert Goold	King Charles III
2016	Joe Mantello	The Humans
2016	Jenn Thompson	Women Without Men
2017
2017	**Ruben Santiago-Hudson**	**Jitney**
2017	Anne Kauffman	A Life
2017	Richard Nelson	What Did You Expect? and Women of a Certain Age
2017	Daniel J. Sullivan	The Little Foxes
2017	Daniel J. Sullivan	If I Forget
2018
2018	**John Tiffany**	**Harry Potter and the Cursed Child**
2018	Marianne Elliott	Angels in America
2018	Jeremy Herrin	People, Places and Things
2018	Joe Mantello	Three Tall Women
2018	Lila Neugebauer	Miles for Mary
2018	Simon Stone	Yerma
2019
2019	**Sam Mendes**	**The Ferryman**
2019	Sarah Benson	Fairview
2019	Stephen Daldry and Justin Martin	The Jungle
2019	Tyne Rafaeli	Usual Girls
2019	Taylor Reynolds	Plano
2019	Jeff Wise	Life Sucks

=== 2020s ===
Year	Director	Production
2020	**Stephen Daldry**	**The Inheritance**
2020	Jessica Blank	Coal Country
2020	John Ortiz	Halfway Bitches Go Straight to Heaven
2020	Tina Satter	Is This A Room
2020	Erica Schmidt	Mac Beth
2021	No awards: New York theatres shuttered, March 2020 to September 2021, due to the COVID-19 pandemic in New York City	
2022	**Rebecca Frecknall**	**Sanctuary City**
2022	Knud Adams	English
2022	Saheem Ali	Merry Wives
2022	Taibi Magar	Twilight: Los Angeles, 1992
2022	Whitney White	On Sugarland
2023	**Max Webster**	**Life of Pi**
2023	Zi Alikhan	On That Day in Amsterdam
2023	Shayok Misha Chowdhury	Public Obscenities
2023	Miranda Cromwell	Death of a Salesman
2023	Adam Meggido	Peter Pan Goes Wrong
2023	Alexander Zeldin	Love
2024	**Daniel Aukin**	**Stereophonic**
2024	Rupert Goold	The Hunt
2024	Kenny Leon	Purlie Victorious
2024	Lila Neugebauer	Appropriate
2024	Ciarán O’Reilly	Philadelphia, Here I Come!
2025	**Danya Taymor**	**John Proctor is the Villain**
2025	David Cromer and Caitlin Sullivan	The Antiquities
2025	Stephen Daldry and Justin Martin	Stranger Things: The First Shadow
2025	Tyne Rafaeli	Becoming Eve
2025	Jack Serio	Grangeville
2025	Whitney White	Liberation
2025	Kip Williams	The Picture of Dorian Gray
2026
2026	**Joe Mantello**	**Death of a Salesman**
2026	Jesse Berger	Titus Andronicus
2026	David Cromer	Caroline
2026	Trip Cullman	Becky Shaw
2026	Kenny Leon	The Balusters
2026	Tarell Alvin McCraney and Bijan Sheibani	The Brothers Size
2026	Jack Serio	Well, I'll Let You Go

== Multiple wins ==
3 wins

- Jack O'Brien
- Jerry Zaks

2 wins

- John Dexter
- Mike Nichols
- Trevor Nunn
- George C. Scott
- Michael Blakemore
- Gerald Gutierrez
- Stephen Daldry

== Multiple nominations ==
7 nominations

- Daniel J. Sullivan

6 nominations

- Joe Mantello

5 nominations

- Mike Nichols

4 nominations

- George C. Scott
- Lloyd Richards
- Jack O'Brien
- Jerry Zaks
- Stephen Daldry
- Sam Mendes

3 nominations

- Athol Fugard
- Gene Saks
- John Tillinger
- Michael Blakemore
- Gerald Gutierrez
- Howard Davies
- Lynne Meadow
- Mark Wing-Davey
- Scott Elliott
- Doug Hughes
- Deborah Warner
- Matthew Warchus
- Michael Grandage
- Sam Gold
- Lila Neugebauer

2 nominations

- John Dexter
- Frank Dunlop
- Stephen Porter
- Alan Schneider
- Melvin Bernhardt
- Alan Ayckbourn
- Marshall W. Mason
- Trevor Nunn
- Gary Sinise
- Terry Kinney
- Gregory Mosher
- Ron Lagomarsino
- Norman René
- Adrian Noble
- Michael Greif
- JoAnne Akalaitis
- Jonathan Kent
- Mary Zimmerman
- Declan Donnellan
- Mark Brokaw
- Garry Hynes
- Michael Mayer
- Robert Falls
- Philip Seymour Hoffman
- Edward Hall
- Moisés Kaufman
- Kenny Leon
- Ciarán O’Reilly
- Anna D. Shapiro
- Sarah Benson
- David Cromer
- Ruben Santiago-Hudson
- Marianne Elliott
- Jeremy Herrin
- Anne Kauffman
- John Tiffany
- Rupert Goold
- Justin Martin
- Tyne Rafaeli
- Jack Serio
- Whitney White

== See also ==
- Laurence Olivier Award for Best Director
- Tony Award for Best Direction of a Play
- Outer Critics Circle Award for Outstanding Director of a Play
- Lucille Lortel Award for Outstanding Director
