= 49th Tony Awards =

1995 US theatrical awards ceremony

- Date: June 4, 1995
- Location: Minskoff Theatre, New York City, New York
- Hosted by: Nathan Lane, Glenn Close, Gregory Hines
- Most wins: Sunset Boulevard (7)
- Most nominations: Sunset Boulevard (11)

Television/radio coverage
- Network: CBS

The 49th Annual Tony Awards was held at the Minskoff Theatre on June 4, 1995, and broadcast by CBS. Hosts were Glenn Close, Gregory Hines, and Nathan Lane.

== Eligibility ==
Shows that opened on Broadway during the 1994–1995 season before May 4, 1995 are eligible.

Original plays

- Arcadia
- Defending the Caveman
- Having Our Say
- Indiscretions
- Love! Valour! Compassion!
- My Thing of Love
- On the Waterfront
- Translations
- A Tuna Christmas
- What’s Wrong With This Picture?

Original musicals

- Smokey Joe's Cafe
- Sunset Boulevard

Play revivals

- A Christmas Carol
- The Glass Menagerie
- Hamlet
- Hedda Gabler
- The Heiress
- The Molière Comedies
- A Month in the Country
- Philadelphia, Here I Come!
- The Rose Tattoo
- The Shadow Box
- Uncle Vanya

Musical revivals

- Gentlemen Prefer Blondes
- How to Succeed in Business Without Really Trying
- Show Boat

== The ceremony ==
The musical sequence was "Broadway Songs We've Never Done, and Never Will" with Gregory Hines and Nathan Lane.

Presenters were: Maria Conchita Alonso, Lauren Bacall, Alec Baldwin, Carol Burnett, Red Buttons, Walter Cronkite, Jim Dale, Laurence Fishburne, Gloria Foster, Michele Lee, Lonette McKee, Robert Morse, Sarah Jessica Parker, Jon Secada, Patrick Stewart, Elaine Stritch, Marlo Thomas, Kathleen Turner, Joan Van Ark.

Musicals represented:

- Smokey Joe's Cafe "On Broadway" - The Men;
- How to Succeed in Business Without Really Trying "Brotherhood of Man" - Matthew Broderick, Lillias White and Company;
- Show Boat "Kim's Charleston" - Elaine Stritch, Tammy Amerson and Company;
- Sunset Boulevard - "As If We Never Said Goodbye" - Glenn Close and Company.

A special segment,"Broadway Across America" featured: Buskers in San Francisco ("Busker Alley" - Tommy Tune and Company); Master Class in Los Angeles (Scene with Zoe Caldwell and Audra McDonald); Grease in Boston ("We Go Together" - Company); Hello, Dolly! in San Diego.

== Award winners and nominees ==
Winners are in bold

Best Play	Best Musical
**Love! Valour! Compassion! – Terrence McNally**; Arcadia – Tom Stoppard; Having Our Say – Emily Mann; Indiscretions – Jean Cocteau	**Sunset Boulevard**; Smokey Joe's Cafe
Best Revival of a Play	Best Revival of a Musical
**The Heiress**; Hamlet; The Molière Comedies; The Rose Tattoo	**Show Boat**; How to Succeed in Business Without Really Trying
Best Performance by a Leading Actor in a Play	Best Performance by a Leading Actress in a Play
**Ralph Fiennes – Hamlet as Prince Hamlet**; Brian Bedford – The Molière Comedies as Sganarelle; Roger Rees – Indiscretions as George; Joe Sears – A Tuna Christmas as Various Characters	**Cherry Jones – The Heiress as Catherine Sloper**; Mary Alice – Having Our Say as Bessie Delany; Eileen Atkins – Indiscretions as Léonie; Helen Mirren – A Month in the Country as Natalia Petrovna
Best Performance by a Leading Actor in a Musical	Best Performance by a Leading Actress in a Musical
**Matthew Broderick – How to Succeed in Business Without Really Trying as J. Pierrepont Finch**; Mark Jacoby – Show Boat as Gaylord Ravenal; John McMartin – Show Boat as Cap'n Andy; Alan Campbell – Sunset Boulevard as Joe Gillis	**Glenn Close – Sunset Boulevard as Norma Desmond**; Rebecca Luker – Show Boat as Magnolia Hawks
Best Performance by a Featured Actor in a Play	Best Performance by a Featured Actress in a Play
**John Glover – Love! Valour! Compassion! as John and James Jeckyll**; Stephen Bogardus – Love! Valour! Compassion! as Gregory Mitchell; Anthony Heald – Love! Valour! Compassion! as Perry Sellars; Jude Law – Indiscretions as Michael	**Frances Sternhagen – The Heiress as Lavinia Penniman**; Suzanne Bertish – The Molière Comedies as Lisette/Sganerelle's Wife; Cynthia Nixon – Indiscretions as Madeleine; Mercedes Ruehl – The Shadow Box as Beverly
Best Performance by a Featured Actor in a Musical	Best Performance by a Featured Actress in a Musical
**George Hearn – Sunset Boulevard as Max Von Mayerling**; Michel Bell – Show Boat as Joe; Joel Blum – Show Boat as Frank; Victor Trent Cook – Smokey Joe's Cafe as Various Characters	**Gretha Boston – Show Boat as Queenie**; Brenda Braxton – Smokey Joe's Cafe as Various Characters; B.J. Crosby – Smokey Joe's Cafe as Various Characters; DeLee Lively – Smokey Joe's Cafe as Various Characters
Best Book of a Musical	Best Original Score (Music and/or Lyrics) Written for the Theatre
**Sunset Boulevard – Don Black and Christopher Hampton**; No additional nominees	**Sunset Boulevard – Andrew Lloyd Webber (music) and Don Black and Christopher Hampton (lyrics)**; No additional nominees
Best Scenic Design	Best Costume Design
**John Napier – Sunset Boulevard**; John Lee Beatty – The Heiress; Stephen Brimson Lewis – Indiscretions; Mark Thompson – Arcadia	**Florence Klotz – Show Boat**; Jane Greenwood – The Heiress; Stephen Brimson Lewis – Indiscretions; Anthony Powell – Sunset Boulevard
Best Lighting Design	Best Choreography
**Andrew Bridge – Sunset Boulevard**; Beverly Emmons – The Heiress; Mark Henderson – Indiscretions; Paul Pyant – Arcadia	**Susan Stroman – Show Boat**; Bob Avian – Sunset Boulevard; Wayne Cilento – How to Succeed in Business Without Really Trying; Joey McKneely – Smokey Joe's Cafe
Best Direction of a Play	Best Direction of a Musical
**Gerald Gutierrez – The Heiress**; Emily Mann – Having Our Say; Joe Mantello – Love! Valour! Compassion!; Sean Mathias – Indiscretions	**Harold Prince – Show Boat**; Des McAnuff – How to Succeed in Business Without Really Trying; Trevor Nunn – Sunset Boulevard; Jerry Zaks – Smokey Joe's Cafe

== Special awards ==
Regional Theatre Tony Award

Goodspeed Opera House

Tony Honors for Excellence in Theatre

- National Endowment for the Arts

Special Tony Award

- Carol Channing — Lifetime Achievement
- Harvey Sabinson — Lifetime Achievement

=== Multiple nominations and awards ===
These productions had multiple nominations:

- 11 nominations: Sunset Boulevard
- 10 nominations: Show Boat
- 9 nominations: Indiscretions
- 7 nominations: The Heiress and Smokey Joe's Cafe
- 5 nominations: Love! Valour! Compassion!
- 4 nominations: How to Succeed in Business Without Really Trying
- 3 nominations: Arcadia, Having Our Say and The Molière Comedies
- 2 nominations: Hamlet

The following productions received multiple awards.

- 7 wins: Sunset Boulevard
- 5 wins: Show Boat
- 4 wins: The Heiress
- 2 wins: Love! Valour! Compassion!

== See also ==
- Drama Desk Awards
- 1995 Laurence Olivier Awards – equivalent awards for West End theatre productions
- Obie Award
- New York Drama Critics' Circle
- Theatre World Award
- Lucille Lortel Awards
