= Tony Award for Best Direction of a Play =

American theatre award for Broadway play directors

- Awarded for: Best Direction of a Play
- Location: New York City
- Presented by: American Theatre Wing The Broadway League
- Currently held by: Joe Mantello for Death of a Salesman (2026)
- Website: TonyAwards.com

The Tony Award for Best Direction of a Play has been given since 1960. Before 1960 there was only one award for both play direction and musical direction, then in 1960 the award was split into two categories: Dramatic and Musical. In 1976 the Dramatic category was renamed to Play.

== Winners and nominees ==
indicates the winner

=== 1960s ===
Year	Production	Director
1960 (14th)
1960 (14th)	The Miracle Worker	Arthur Penn
1960 (14th)	The Best Man	Joseph Anthony
1960 (14th)	A Raisin in the Sun	Lloyd Richards
1960 (14th)	Sweet Bird of Youth	Elia Kazan
1960 (14th)	The Tenth Man	Tyrone Guthrie
1961 (15th)
1961 (15th)	Big Fish, Little Fish	John Gielgud
1961 (15th)	All the Way Home	Arthur Penn
1961 (15th)	The Hostage	Joan Littlewood
1961 (15th)	Rhinoceros	Joseph Anthony
1962 (16th)
1962 (16th)	A Man for All Seasons	Noel Willman
1962 (16th)	The Caretaker	Donald McWhinnie
1962 (16th)	Gideon	Tyrone Guthrie
1962 (16th)	Great Day in the Morning	José Quintero
1963 (17th)
1963 (17th)	Who's Afraid of Virginia Woolf?	Alan Schneider
1963 (17th)	Never Too Late	George Abbott
1963 (17th)	The School for Scandal	John Gielgud
1963 (17th)	Tchin-Tchin	Peter Glenville
1964 (18th)
1964 (18th)	Barefoot in the Park	Mike Nichols
1964 (18th)	The Ballad of the Sad Café	Alan Schneider
1964 (18th)	The Deputy	Herman Shumlin
1964 (18th)	Marathon '33	June Havoc
1965 (19th)
1965 (19th)	Luv	Mike Nichols
1965 (19th)	The Odd Couple	Mike Nichols
1965 (19th)	The Subject Was Roses	Ulu Grosbard
1965 (19th)	Tartuffe	William Ball
1965 (19th)	Tiny Alice	Alan Schneider
1966 (20th)
1966 (20th)	Marat/Sade	Peter Brook
1966 (20th)	The Lion in Winter	Noel Willman
1966 (20th)	Philadelphia, Here I Come!	Hilton Edwards
1966 (20th)	You Can't Take It with You	Ellis Rabb
1967 (21st)
1967 (21st)	The Homecoming	Peter Hall
1967 (21st)	Black Comedy	John Dexter
1967 (21st)	A Delicate Balance	Alan Schneider
1967 (21st)	Marat/Sade	Donald Driver
1968 (22nd)
1968 (22nd)	Plaza Suite	Mike Nichols
1968 (22nd)	A Day in the Death of Joe Egg	Michael Blakemore
1968 (22nd)	Rosencrantz and Guildenstern Are Dead	Derek Goldby
1968 (22nd)	You Know I Can't Hear You When the Water's Running	Alan Schneider
1969 (23rd)
1969 (23rd)	Hadrian VII	Peter Dews
1969 (23rd)	Does a Tiger Wear a Necktie?	Michael A. Schultz
1969 (23rd)	The Man in the Glass Booth	Harold Pinter
1969 (23rd)	Play It Again, Sam	Joseph Hardy

=== 1970s ===
Year	Production	Director
1970 (24th)
1970 (24th)	Child's Play	Joseph Hardy
1970 (24th)	Borstal Boy	Tómas Mac Anna
1970 (24th)	Butterflies Are Free	Milton Katselas
1970 (24th)	Last of the Red Hot Lovers	Robert Moore
1971 (25th)
1971 (25th)	A Midsummer Night's Dream	Peter Brook
1971 (25th)	Home	Lindsay Anderson
1971 (25th)	The School for Wives	Stephen Porter
1971 (25th)	Sleuth	Clifford Williams
1972 (26th)
1972 (26th)	The Prisoner of Second Avenue	Mike Nichols
1972 (26th)	Old Times	Peter Hall
1972 (26th)	Sticks and Bones	Jeff Bleckner
1972 (26th)	The Trial of the Catsville Nine	Gordon Davidson
1973 (27th)
1973 (27th)	That Championship Season	A. J. Antoon
1973 (27th)	The Changing Room	Michael Rudman
1973 (27th)	Much Ado About Nothing	A. J. Antoon
1973 (27th)	The Sunshine Boys	Alan Arkin
1974 (28th)
1974 (28th)	A Moon for the Misbegotten	José Quintero
1974 (28th)	Chemin de Fer	Stephen Porter
1974 (28th)	Find Your Way Home	Edwin Sherin
1974 (28th)	Ulysses in Nighttown	Burgess Meredith
1974 (28th)	Uncle Vanya	Mike Nichols
1975 (29th)
1975 (29th)	Equus	John Dexter
1975 (29th)	London Assurance	Ronald Eyre
1975 (29th)	The National Health	Arvin Brown
1975 (29th)	Same Time, Next Year	Gene Saks
1975 (29th)	Scapino	Frank Dunlop
1975 (29th)	Sizwe Banzi Is Dead and The Island	Athol Fugard
1976 (30th)
1976 (30th)	The Royal Family	Ellis Rabb
1976 (30th)	Ah, Wilderness!	Arvin Brown
1976 (30th)	Knock Knock	Marshall W. Mason
1976 (30th)	Travesties	Peter Wood
1977 (31st)
1977 (31st)	The Shadow Box	Gordon Davidson
1977 (31st)	American Buffalo	Ulu Grosbard
1977 (31st)	Comedians	Mike Nichols
1977 (31st)	Streamers	Mike Nichols
1978 (32nd)
1978 (32nd)	Da	Melvin Bernhardt
1978 (32nd)	Deathtrap	Robert Moore
1978 (32nd)	Dracula	Dennis Rosa
1978 (32nd)	The Gin Game	Mike Nichols
1979 (33rd)
1979 (33rd)	The Elephant Man	Jack Hofsiss
1979 (33rd)	Bedroom Farce	Alan Ayckbourn and Peter Hall
1979 (33rd)	The Crucifer of Blood	Paul Giovanni
1979 (33rd)	Whose Life Is It Anyway?	Michael Lindsay-Hogg

=== 1980s ===
Year	Production	Director
1980 (34th)
1980 (34th)	Morning's at Seven	Vivian Matalon
1980 (34th)	Betrayal	Peter Hall
1980 (34th)	Children of a Lesser God	Gordon Davidson
1980 (34th)	Talley's Folly	Marshall W. Mason
1981 (35th)
1981 (35th)	Amadeus	Peter Hall
1981 (35th)	Fifth of July	Marshall W. Mason
1981 (35th)	A Life	Peter Coe
1981 (35th)	The Little Foxes	Austin Pendleton
1982 (36th)
1982 (36th)	The Life and Adventures of Nicholas Nickleby	John Caird and Trevor Nunn
1982 (36th)	Crimes of the Heart	Melvin Bernhardt
1982 (36th)	Mass Appeal	Geraldine Fitzgerald
1982 (36th)	"Master Harold"...and the Boys	Athol Fugard
1983 (37th)
1983 (37th)	Brighton Beach Memoirs	Gene Saks
1983 (37th)	All's Well That Ends Well	Trevor Nunn
1983 (37th)	Angels Fall	Marshall W. Mason
1983 (37th)	'Night, Mother	Tom Moore
1984 (38th)
1984 (38th)	The Real Thing	Mike Nichols
1984 (38th)	Glengarry Glen Ross	Gregory Mosher
1984 (38th)	A Moon for the Misbegotten	David Leveaux
1984 (38th)	Noises Off	Michael Blakemore
1985 (39th)
1985 (39th)	Biloxi Blues	Gene Saks
1985 (39th)	As Is	Marshall W. Mason
1985 (39th)	Much Ado About Nothing	Terry Hands
1985 (39th)	Strange Interlude	Keith Hack
1986 (40th)
1986 (40th)	The House of Blue Leaves	Jerry Zaks
1986 (40th)	The Iceman Cometh	José Quintero
1986 (40th)	Long Day's Journey Into Night	Jonathan Miller
1986 (40th)	Loot	John Tillinger
1987 (41st)
1987 (41st)	Fences	Lloyd Richards
1987 (41st)	Asinamali!	Mbongeni Ngema
1987 (41st)	Coastal Disturbances	Carole Rothman
1987 (41st)	Les Liaisons Dangereuses	Howard Davies
1988 (42nd)
1988 (42nd)	M. Butterfly	John Dexter
1988 (42nd)	Breaking the Code	Clifford Williams
1988 (42nd)	Joe Turner's Come and Gone	Lloyd Richards
1988 (42nd)	Speed-the-Plow	Gregory Mosher
1989 (43rd)
1989 (43rd)	Lend Me a Tenor	Jerry Zaks
1989 (43rd)	The Heidi Chronicles	Daniel J. Sullivan
1989 (43rd)	Largely New York	Bill Irwin
1989 (43rd)	Our Town	Gregory Mosher

=== 1990s ===
Year	Production	Director
1990 (44th)
1990 (44th)	The Grapes of Wrath	Frank Galati
1990 (44th)	Lettice and Lovage	Michael Blakemore
1990 (44th)	The Merchant of Venice	Peter Hall
1990 (44th)	The Piano Lesson	Lloyd Richards
1991 (45th)
1991 (45th)	Six Degrees of Separation	Jerry Zaks
1991 (45th)	La Bête	Richard Jones
1991 (45th)	Lost in Yonkers	Gene Saks
1991 (45th)	Our Country's Good	Mark Lamos
1992 (46th)
1992 (46th)	Dancing at Lughnasa	Patrick Mason
1992 (46th)	Conversations with My Father	Daniel J. Sullivan
1992 (46th)	Four Baboons Adoring the Sun	Peter Hall
1992 (46th)	Two Shakespearean Actors	Jack O'Brien
1993 (47th)
1993 (47th)	Angels in America: Millennium Approaches	George C. Wolfe
1993 (47th)	Anna Christie	David Leveaux
1993 (47th)	The Sisters Rosensweig	Daniel J. Sullivan
1993 (47th)	The Song of Jacob Zulu	Eric Simonson
1994 (48th)
1994 (48th)	An Inspector Calls	Stephen Daldry
1994 (48th)	Abe Lincoln in Illinois	Gerald Gutierrez
1994 (48th)	Angels in America: Perestroika	George C. Wolfe
1994 (48th)	Timon of Athens	Michael Langham
1995 (49th)
1995 (49th)	The Heiress	Gerald Gutierrez
1995 (49th)	Having Our Say	Emily Mann
1995 (49th)	Indiscretions	Sean Mathias
1995 (49th)	Love! Valour! Compassion!	Joe Mantello
1996 (50th)
1996 (50th)	A Delicate Balance	Gerald Gutierrez
1996 (50th)	Buried Child	Gary Sinise
1996 (50th)	An Ideal Husband	Peter Hall
1996 (50th)	Seven Guitars	Lloyd Richards
1997 (51st)
1997 (51st)	A Doll's House	Anthony Page
1997 (51st)	The Gin Game	Charles Nelson Reilly
1997 (51st)	Skylight	Richard Eyre
1997 (51st)	Stanley	John Caird
1998 (52nd)
1998 (52nd)	The Beauty Queen of Leenane	Garry Hynes
1998 (52nd)	'Art'	Matthew Warchus
1998 (52nd)	The Chairs	Simon McBurney
1998 (52nd)	A View from the Bridge	Michael Mayer
1999 (53rd)
1999 (53rd)	Death of a Salesman	Robert Falls
1999 (53rd)	The Iceman Cometh	Howard Davies
1999 (53rd)	The Lonesome West	Garry Hynes
1999 (53rd)	Not About Nightingales	Trevor Nunn

=== 2000s ===
Year	Production	Director
2000 (54th)
2000 (54th)	Copenhagen	Michael Blakemore
2000 (54th)	Dirty Blonde	James Lapine
2000 (54th)	The Real Thing	David Leveaux
2000 (54th)	True West	Matthew Warchus
2001 (55th)
2001 (55th)	Proof	Daniel J. Sullivan
2001 (55th)	The Invention of Love	Jack O'Brien
2001 (55th)	King Hedley II	Marion McClinton
2001 (55th)	Stones in His Pockets	Ian McElhinney
2002 (56th)
2002 (56th)	Metamorphoses	Mary Zimmerman
2002 (56th)	The Crucible	Richard Eyre
2002 (56th)	Morning's at Seven	Daniel J. Sullivan
2002 (56th)	Private Lives	Howard Davies
2003 (57th)
2003 (57th)	Take Me Out	Joe Mantello
2003 (57th)	A Day in the Death of Joe Egg	Laurence Boswell
2003 (57th)	Long Day's Journey Into Night	Robert Falls
2003 (57th)	Medea	Deborah Warner
2004 (58th)
2004 (58th)	Henry IV, Part 1 and Part 2	Jack O'Brien
2004 (58th)	Frozen	Doug Hughes
2004 (58th)	I Am My Own Wife	Moises Kaufman
2004 (58th)	Jumpers	David Leveaux
2005 (59th)
2005 (59th)	Doubt	Doug Hughes
2005 (59th)	Glengarry Glen Ross	Joe Mantello
2005 (59th)	The Pillowman	John Crowley
2005 (59th)	Twelve Angry Men	Scott Ellis
2006 (60th)
2006 (60th)	The History Boys	Nicholas Hytner
2006 (60th)	Awake and Sing!	Bartlett Sher
2006 (60th)	The Lieutenant of Inishmore	Wilson Milam
2006 (60th)	Rabbit Hole	Daniel J. Sullivan
2007 (61st)
2007 (61st)	The Coast of Utopia	Jack O'Brien
2007 (61st)	Coram Boy	Melly Still
2007 (61st)	Frost/Nixon	Michael Grandage
2007 (61st)	Journey's End	David Grindley
2008 (62nd)
2008 (62nd)	August: Osage County	Anna D. Shapiro
2008 (62nd)	Boeing Boeing	Matthew Warchus
2008 (62nd)	The Seafarer	Conor McPherson
2008 (62nd)	The 39 Steps	Maria Aitken
2009 (63rd)
2009 (63rd)	God of Carnage	Matthew Warchus
2009 (63rd)	Joe Turner's Come and Gone	Bartlett Sher
2009 (63rd)	Mary Stuart	Phyllida Lloyd
2009 (63rd)	The Norman Conquests	Matthew Warchus

=== 2010s ===
Year	Production	Director
2010 (64th)
2010 (64th)	Red	Michael Grandage
2010 (64th)	Fences	Kenny Leon
2010 (64th)	Next Fall	Sheryl Kaller
2010 (64th)	A View from the Bridge	Gregory Mosher
2011 (65th)
2011 (65th)	War Horse	Marianne Elliott and Tom Morris
2011 (65th)	The Merchant of Venice	Daniel J. Sullivan
2011 (65th)	The Motherfucker with the Hat	Anna D. Shapiro
2011 (65th)	The Normal Heart	Joel Grey and George C. Wolfe
2012 (66th)
2012 (66th)	Death of a Salesman	Mike Nichols
2012 (66th)	Clybourne Park	Pam MacKinnon
2012 (66th)	One Man, Two Guvnors	Nicholas Hytner
2012 (66th)	Peter and the Starcatcher	Roger Rees and Alex Timbers
2013 (67th)
2013 (67th)	Who's Afraid of Virginia Woolf?	Pam MacKinnon
2013 (67th)	Golden Boy	Bartlett Sher
2013 (67th)	Lucky Guy	George C. Wolfe
2013 (67th)	Vanya and Sonia and Masha and Spike	Nicholas Martin
2014 (68th)
2014 (68th)	A Raisin in the Sun	Kenny Leon
2014 (68th)	The Cripple of Inishmaan	Michael Grandage
2014 (68th)	The Glass Menagerie	John Tiffany
2014 (68th)	Twelfth Night	Tim Carroll
2015 (69th)
2015 (69th)	The Curious Incident of the Dog in the Night-Time	Marianne Elliott
2015 (69th)	Hand to God	Moritz von Stuelpnagel
2015 (69th)	Skylight	Stephen Daldry
2015 (69th)	Wolf Hall Parts One & Two	Jeremy Herrin
2015 (69th)	You Can't Take It with You	Scott Ellis
2016 (70th)
2016 (70th)	A View from the Bridge	Ivo van Hove
2016 (70th)	Eclipsed	Liesl Tommy
2016 (70th)	The Humans	Joe Mantello
2016 (70th)	King Charles III	Rupert Goold
2016 (70th)	Long Day's Journey into Night	Jonathan Kent
2017 (71st)
2017 (71st)	Indecent	Rebecca Taichman
2017 (71st)	A Doll's House, Part 2	Sam Gold
2017 (71st)	Jitney	Ruben Santiago-Hudson
2017 (71st)	The Little Foxes	Daniel J. Sullivan
2017 (71st)	Oslo	Bartlett Sher
2018 (72nd)
2018 (72nd)	Harry Potter and the Cursed Child	John Tiffany
2018 (72nd)	Angels in America	Marianne Elliott
2018 (72nd)	The Iceman Cometh	George C. Wolfe
2018 (72nd)	Three Tall Women	Joe Mantello
2018 (72nd)	Travesties	Patrick Marber
2019 (73rd)
2019 (73rd)	The Ferryman	Sam Mendes
2019 (73rd)	Gary: A Sequel to Titus Andronicus	George C. Wolfe
2019 (73rd)	Ink	Rupert Goold
2019 (73rd)	Network	Ivo van Hove
2019 (73rd)	To Kill a Mockingbird	Bartlett Sher

=== 2020s ===
Year	Production	Director
2020 (74th)
2020 (74th)	The Inheritance	Stephen Daldry
2020 (74th)	Betrayal	Jamie Lloyd
2020 (74th)	Slave Play	Robert O'Hara
2020 (74th)	A Soldier's Play	Kenny Leon
2020 (74th)	The Sound Inside	David Cromer
2022 (75th)
2022 (75th)	The Lehman Trilogy	Sam Mendes
2022 (75th)	American Buffalo	Neil Pepe
2022 (75th)	Dana H.	Les Waters
2022 (75th)	for colored girls who have considered suicide/when the rainbow is enuf	Camille A. Brown
2022 (75th)	The Skin of Our Teeth	Lileana Blain-Cruz
2023 (76th)
2023 (76th)	Leopoldstadt	Patrick Marber
2023 (76th)	Ain't No Mo'	Stevie Walker-Webb
2023 (76th)	Cost of Living	Jo Bonney
2023 (76th)	A Doll's House	Jamie Lloyd
2023 (76th)	Fat Ham	Saheem Ali
2023 (76th)	Life of Pi	Max Webster
2024 (77th)
2024 (77th)	Stereophonic	Daniel Aukin
2024 (77th)	Appropriate	Lila Neugebauer
2024 (77th)	Jaja's African Hair Braiding	Whitney White
2024 (77th)	Mary Jane	Anne Kauffman
2024 (77th)	Purlie Victorious: A Non-Confederate Romp through the Cotton Patch	Kenny Leon
2025 (78th)
2025 (78th)	Oh, Mary!	Sam Pinkleton
2025 (78th)	English	Knud Adams
2025 (78th)	The Hills of California	Sam Mendes
2025 (78th)	John Proctor Is the Villain	Danya Taymor
2025 (78th)	The Picture of Dorian Gray	Kip Williams
2026 (79th)
2026 (79th)	Death of a Salesman	Joe Mantello
2026 (79th)	The Balusters	Kenny Leon
2026 (79th)	Giant	Nicholas Hytner
2026 (79th)	Liberation	Whitney White
2026 (79th)	Oedipus	Robert Icke

== Multiple wins ==
6 Wins

- Mike Nichols

3 Wins

- Jerry Zaks

2 Wins

- Peter Brook
- Stephen Daldry
- John Dexter
- Marianne Elliott
- Gerald Gutierrez
- Peter Hall
- Joe Mantello
- Sam Mendes
- Jack O'Brien
- Gene Saks

== Multiple nominations ==
10 Nominations

- Mike Nichols

8 Nominations

- Peter Hall
- Daniel J. Sullivan

6 Nominations

- Joe Mantello
- George C. Wolfe

5 Nominations

- Kenny Leon
- Marshall W. Mason
- Lloyd Richards
- Alan Schneider
- Bartlett Sher
- Matthew Warchus

4 Nominations

- Michael Blakemore
- David Leveaux
- Gregory Mosher
- Jack O'Brien
- Gene Saks

3 Nominations

- Stephen Daldry
- Gordon Davidson
- Howard Davies
- John Dexter
- Marianne Elliott
- Michael Grandage
- Gerald Gutierrez
- Nicholas Hytner
- Sam Mendes
- Trevor Nunn
- José Quintero
- Jerry Zaks

2 Nominations

- Joseph Anthony
- A. J. Antoon
- Melvin Bernhardt
- Peter Brook
- Arvin Brown
- John Caird
- Scott Ellis
- Richard Eyre
- Robert Falls
- Athol Fugard
- John Gielgud
- Rupert Goold
- Ulu Grosbard
- Tyrone Guthrie
- Joseph Hardy
- Ivo van Hove
- Doug Hughes
- Garry Hynes
- Pam MacKinnon
- Jamie Lloyd
- Patrick Marber
- Robert Moore
- Arthur Penn
- Stephen Porter
- Ellis Rabb
- Anna D. Shapiro
- John Tiffany
- Whitney White
- Clifford Williams
- Noel Willman

== Female winners ==
Only 6 women have won this award:

- Garry Hynes – The Beauty Queen of Leenane (1998)
- Mary Zimmerman – Metamorphoses (2002)
- Anna D. Shapiro – August: Osage County (2008)
- Pam MacKinnon – Who's Afraid of Virginia Woolf? revival (2013)
- Marianne Elliott – War Horse (2011) (shared with Tom Morris) and The Curious Incident of the Dog in the Night-Time (2015), making her the only woman to win this award more than once
- Rebecca Taichman – Indecent (2017)

== See also ==
- Tony Award for Best Direction of a Musical
- Drama Desk Award for Outstanding Director of a Play
- Laurence Olivier Award for Best Director
- List of Tony Award-nominated productions
