= Clifford Williams (actor) =

Welsh theatre director and actor (1926–2005)

Clifford Williams (30 December 1926 – 20 August 2005) was a Welsh theatre director and stage actor. He was born in Cardiff, Wales, and died in London, England.

== Early life ==
Clifford Williams (born Sidney Clifford Williams), son of George F. Williams and Florence (Gapper) was born in Cardiff in December 1926. He attended Highbury Grammar School. He served in the British Army Ordnance Corps (RAOC) from 1945 to 1948.

Williams was a fellow of Trinity College of Music (London), as well as the Welsh College of Music and Drama (on the Board of Governors from 1980).

== Career ==
Founder, 1994: (Director and Playwright) Mime Theatre London. 1950-53: Artistic Director, Marlowe Theatre, Canterbury, 1956 Queen's Theatre, Hornchurch, 1957 Arts Theatre, London. 1963-80, Associate Director, Royal Shakespeare Company, U.K.

From 1963: Artistic Directorships at: National Theatre, U.K., also the national theatres of: Spain, Yugoslavia, Mexico, Finland, Bulgaria, France, Denmark, Sweden, USSR, Canada, Japan Germany.

In the United States, his Broadway productions included: The Comedy of Errors, Soldiers, Sleuth, Emperor Henry IVth, As You Like It, A Pack of Lies, Aren’t We All? Breaking the Code (TV) and Man and Superman. His opera productions include: The Flying Dutchman, Savitri, Dido and Aeneas, Bellman’s Opera.

Musical productions include (in London): Our Man Creighton, Mardi Gras, Oh! Calcutta and Carte Blanche. He was the author of the children’s plays The Sleeping Princess, The Goose Girl and The Secret Kingdom, and he translated Ibsen, Strindberg and Chekhov.

He was chairman of the British Theatre Association (1978-90).

For the Royal Shakespeare Company: Directed 31 productions including the Comedy of Errors (with Ian Richardson, Michael Williams, Timothy West, Donald Burton, Elizabeth Spriggs, Janet Suzman and Susan Engel); The Merchant of Venice (Janet Suzman, Eric Porter and William Squire) and The Jew of Malta (Eric Porter and Tony Church).

== Selected theatre credits ==
- The Comedy of Errors (1962), for the Royal Shakespeare Company
- Cymbeline (1974), for the RSC
- The Duchess of Malfi (1971), for the RSC
- As You Like It (1974)
- Sleuth (1970)
- Antony and Cleopatra (1951–1952) (actor)
- Caesar and Cleopatra (1951–1952) (actor)
