= Equus (play) =

1973 play by Peter Shaffer

- Original language: English
- Written by: Peter Shaffer
- Characters: Martin Dysart; Alan Strang; Frank Strang; Jill Mason; Hesther Soloman; Dora Strang; Nurse; Harry Dalton; Horseman; Nugget
- Subject: 17-year-old boy blinds six horses with a spike, case becomes a catalyst for his psychiatrist's own doubts
- Genre: Drama
- Setting: The Present; Rokeby Psychiatric Hospital, Southern England

Premiere
- Date: 1973
- Place: Royal National Theatre

Equus is a 1973 play by Peter Shaffer, about a child psychiatrist who attempts to treat a young man who has a pathological religious fascination with horses.

Shaffer was inspired to write Equus when he heard of a crime involving a 17-year-old boy who blinded 26 horses in a small town in northern England. He set out to construct a fictional account of what might have caused the incident, without knowing any of the details of the crime, and to evoke the same "air of mystery" and "numinous" qualities as his 1964 play The Royal Hunt of the Sun but in a more modern setting. The narrative of the play follows Dr. Martin Dysart's attempts to understand the cause of the boy's (Alan Strang) actions while wrestling with his own sense of purpose and the nature of his work.

The original stage production ran at the National Theatre in London from 1973 to 1975, directed by John Dexter. Alec McCowen played Dysart, and Peter Firth played Alan Strang. The first Broadway production starred Anthony Hopkins as Dysart (later played by Richard Burton, Leonard Nimoy, and Anthony Perkins) and Firth as Alan. When Firth left for Broadway, Dai Bradley took over the role of Alan in the London production, playing opposite Michael Jayston as Dr. Dysart. Tom Hulce later replaced Firth during the Broadway run. The Broadway production ran for 1,209 performances. Marian Seldes appeared in every single performance of the Broadway run, first in the role of Hesther and then as Dora. Shaffer would later adapt the play for a 1977 film of the same name directed by Sidney Lumet.

The narrative centres on religious and ritual sacrifice themes, as well as the manner in which Strang constructs a personal theology involving the horses and the godhead "Equus". Alan sees the horses as representative of God and confuses his adoration of his "God" with sexual attraction. Also important is Shaffer's examination of the conflict between personal values and satisfaction and societal mores, expectations, and institutions, and between Apollonian and Dionysian values and systems.

== Plot summary ==
=== Act 1 ===
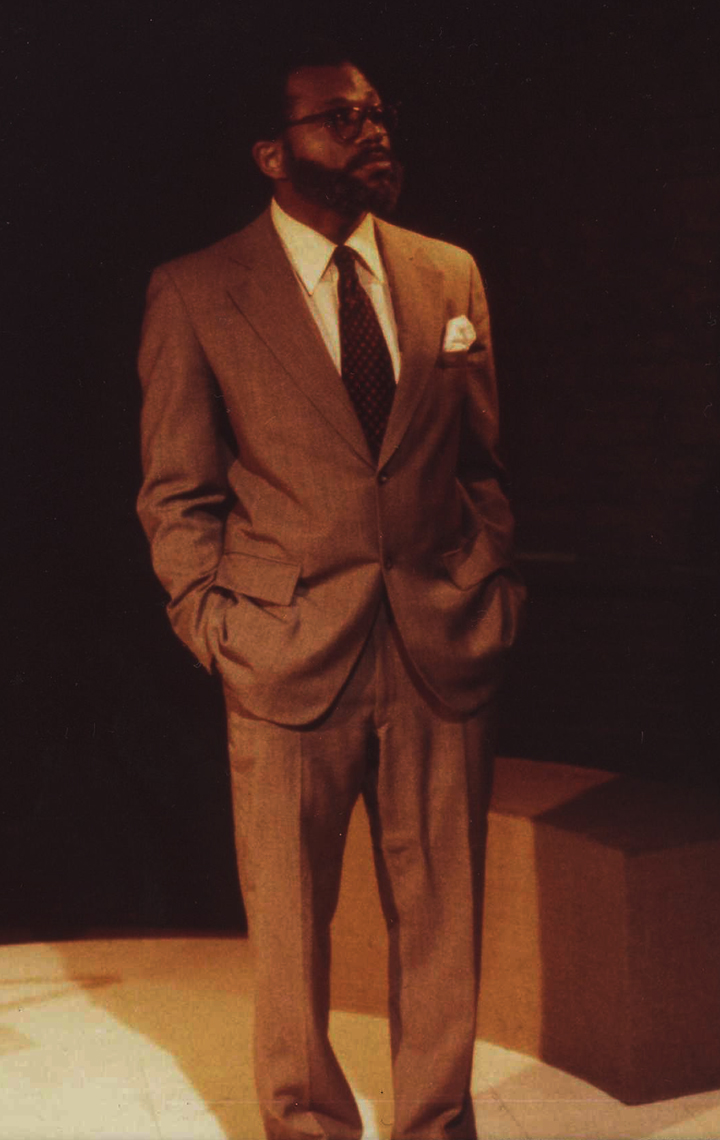
Charles S. Dutton as Dysart in Equus, as directed by Brad Mays in May 1979 in Baltimore

Martin Dysart is a psychiatrist working in a psychiatric hospital. He begins with a monologue in which he outlines the case of 17-year-old Alan Strang, who has blinded six horses. He divulges his feeling that his occupation is not all that he wishes it to be and his dissatisfaction and disappointment with his life. Dysart finds that the supply of troubled young people for him to "adjust" back into "normal" living is never-ending, but he doubts the value of treating these youths, since they will simply return to a dull, normal life that lacks any commitment or "worship". He comments that while Strang's crime was extreme, just such extremity is needed to break free from the chains of existence.

A court magistrate, Hesther Saloman, visits Dysart, believing that he has the skills to help Alan come to terms with what he did. At the hospital, Dysart struggles to engage with Alan, who at first responds to questioning by singing TV advertising jingles.

Dysart reveals a dream he has had, in a Homeric Grecian setting, in which he is a public official presiding over a mass ritual sacrifice. One after another, he slices open the abdomens of hundreds of children and pulls out their entrails. He becomes disgusted with what he is doing, but fears being murdered in the same manner if discovered as a "non-believer" by the other priests, and so continues. Eventually the other priests become aware of his misgivings and grab the knife from his hand, at which point he awakens from the dream.

Dysart interviews Alan's parents. He learns that, from an early age, Alan has been receiving conflicting views on religion from his parents. Alan's mother, Dora, is a devout Christian who has read to him daily from the Bible, but this practice has antagonized Alan's father Frank, a non-believer.

Slowly, Dysart makes contact with Alan by playing a game where each of them asks a question, which must be answered honestly.

Dysart learns that Frank, concerned that Alan was taking far too much interest in the more violent aspects of the Bible, destroyed a violent picture of the crucifixion of Jesus that Alan had hung at the foot of his bed. Alan then replaced the picture with one of a horse, with large, staring eyes.

Alan reveals to Dysart that, during his youth, his attraction to horses came about by way of his mother's Biblical tales, a horse story that she had read to him, Western films, and his grandfather's interest in horses and riding. Alan's sexual education began with his mother, who told him that he could find true love and contentment by way of religious devotion and marriage. During this time, Alan also began to develop a sexual attraction to horses, desiring to pet their coats, feel their muscular bodies, and smell their sweat. Alan reveals to Dysart that he had first encountered a horse at age six, on the beach. A rider approached him, and took him up on the horse. Alan was visibly excited, but his parents found him and Frank pulled him violently off the horse; the horse rider scoffed at Frank and rode off.

Dysart hypnotizes Alan, during which he reveals elements of his dream about human sacrifice. He begins to jog Alan's memory by filling in blanks and asking questions. Alan reveals that he wants to help captive horses by removing the bit, which enslaves them.

After turning 17, Alan took a job working in a shop selling electrical goods, where he met Jill Mason, an outgoing and free-spirited young woman who works for a local stable owner. She visited the shop wanting to purchase blades for horse-clippers, which piqued Alan's interest. Jill suggested that Alan work for Harry Dalton, the owner of the stables, to which Alan agreed.

Dysart meets with Dalton, who tells him that he first held Alan to be a model worker, since he kept the stables immaculately clean and groomed the horses, including one named Nugget. Through Dysart's questioning, it becomes clear that Alan is erotically fixated on Nugget (or "Equus") and secretly takes him for midnight rides, bareback and naked. Alan envisions himself as a king astride the godhead Equus, both destroying their enemies.

=== Act 2 ===
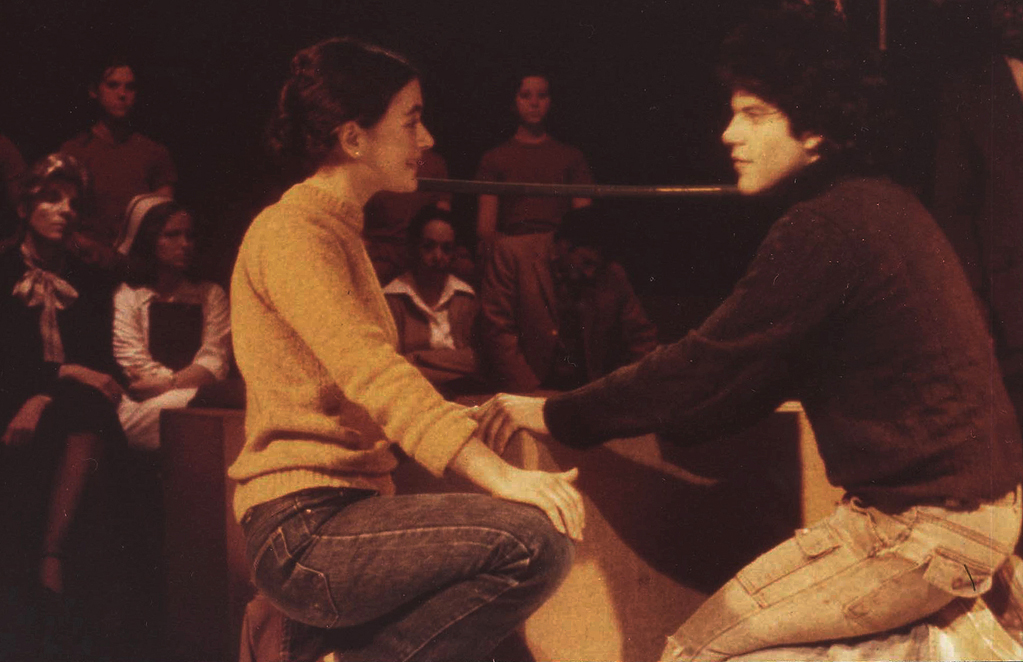
Lauren Raher and Brad Mays as Jill and Alan in Equus, as directed by Mays in May 1979 in Baltimore

Dysart gives Alan a placebo "truth pill". Revealing a tryst with Jill, Alan begins to re-enact the event:

Jill, who has taken an interest in Alan, asks him to take her to an adult movie theater. While there, they run into Frank. Alan is traumatized, particularly when he realizes that his father is lying to justify his presence in the theatre; however, this allows Alan to realize that sex is a natural thing for all men, even his father. Alan walks Jill home after they leave and she convinces Alan to come to the stables with her.

Once there, Jill seduces Alan and the two undress and attempt to have sex. However, Alan hesitates when he hears the horses making noises in the stables beneath, and he is unable to get an erection. Jill tries to ask Alan what the problem is, but he shouts at her to leave. After Jill dresses and walks out of the stables, the still-nude Alan begs the horses for forgiveness.

"Mine!...You're mine!...I am yours and you are mine!" cries Equus through Dysart's voice, but then he becomes threatening: "The Lord thy God is a jealous God," Equus/Dysart seethes, "He sees you, he sees you forever and ever, Alan. He sees you!...He sees you!" Alan screams, "God seest!" and then says "No more. No more, Equus!" Alan then uses a steel spike to blind the six horses in the stable, whose eyes have "seen" his very soul.

In the final scene, Dysart delivers a monologue questioning the fundamentals of his practice and whether his methods will help Alan, as the effect of his treatment will make him normal, but at the cost of his humanity.

== Original Broadway production ==
The play opened on Broadway at the Plymouth Theatre on 24 October 1974, ending on 11 September 1976. It then opened at the Helen Hayes Theatre on 5 October 1976, ending on 2 October 1977, for a total of 1,209 performances.

== Film adaptation ==
Shaffer adapted the play for a 1977 film starring Richard Burton, Peter Firth, Eileen Atkins, Colin Blakely, Joan Plowright, and Jenny Agutter, directed by Sidney Lumet. Unlike stage productions, where the horses are portrayed by human actors, often muscular men wearing tribal-style masks, Lumet did not believe this could adequately be done in a film version "because the reality he [Alan] was being watched he was going to create the dilemma within him."

Comparing the film to the play, English professor James M. Welsh felt using real horses in the film was understandable, but argued the outdoor scenes infringed on the "abstract theatrical design" that gave the play its creativity. Welsh also felt the explicit depiction of the blinding was "potentially repulsive" and that "much of the spirit of the play is lost as a consequence."

== Audio adaptation ==
An audio adaptation of the play was broadcast on BBC Radio 4 in 1980, starring Peter Barkworth as Dysart and Ian Sharrock as Alan, with sound effects by the BBC Radiophonic Workshop. It was rebroadcast on BBC Radio 4 Extra in 2026.

== Revivals ==
The first Midwest U.S. production of Equus opened March 1978 in Lansing, Michigan, at Boarshead Theatre. Directed by John Peakes, it featured Richard Thomsen as Dysart, David Kropp as Alan, Carmen Decker as Dora, and Lisa Hodge as Jill. Local controversy over the nude scene was largely mitigated by casting a married couple as Jill and Alan. This production went on to win Boarshead Theatre's annual awards for Best Production and Best Supporting Actor (Kropp).

The Lovegrove Alley Theatre of Baltimore staged a production of Equus in 1979. The production starred a pre-Broadway Charles S. Dutton in the role of Dysart. Director Brad Mays did double duty in the role of Alan Strang. Lauren Raher played Jill Mason, and her real-life mother Rhona Raher portrayed Dora, Alan's mother.

West End producers David Pugh and Dafydd Rogers revived Equus in 2007, starring Richard Griffiths, Daniel Radcliffe, and Joanna Christie in the leading roles. The production was directed by Thea Sharrock, and opened in February 2007 at the Gielgud Theatre. The production attracted press attention since both Radcliffe and Griffiths had starred in the Harry Potter film series (as Harry Potter and Vernon Dursley, respectively). In particular, the casting of seventeen-year-old Radcliffe triggered some controversy since the role of Alan Strang required him to appear nude onstage. Radcliffe insisted that the nude scene was not "gratuitous", and that he should portray the character and the scene as called for by the script. This revival was subsequently transferred to Broadway, running at the Broadhurst Theatre through 8 February 2009. Radcliffe and Griffiths reprised their roles, and Thea Sharrock returned as director. The cast also included Kate Mulgrew, Anna Camp, Carolyn McCormick, Lorenzo Pisoni, T. Ryder Smith, Graeme Malcolm, and Sandra Shipley, with Collin Baja, Tyrone Jackson, Spencer Liff, Adesola Osakalumi, and Marc Spaulding. Radcliffe was nominated for the Drama Desk Award for Outstanding Actor in a Play.

The first illustrated edition of the play text was produced as a large-format artist's book by the Old Stile Press, with images and an afterword by the British artist Clive Hicks-Jenkins, in 2009.

City Lights Theater Company of San Jose, California revived Equus in March 2011. This production, featuring actors Sean Gilvary as Alan Strang and Steve Lambert as Martin Dysart, received rave reviews. The San Jose Mercury News labelled Gilvary and Lambert as "haunting," stating Gilvary "...exposing emotions and epidermis, rides bareback in every sense. He gradually manages to make a rather unattractive young creature seem not only sympathetic but redeemable while retaining his hostility and humanity." StarkInsider rated the production 4.5 out of 5 stars, calling Lambert "superb" and having a "pitch-perfect performance," while calling Gilvary "dazzling" and having "a preternatural ability to inhabit the very soul of his character. Like the troubled teen that he portrays, both he and Strang possess a passion for something that is an inseparable part of their personality." This production received a Standout Classic Production Award by Silicon Valley Small Theatre Awards.

Equus was revived in Houston for a limited run in July 2014 at Frenetic Theatre. The production was largely funded by donations on Kickstarter and was well received by critics and audiences alike. Broadway World called the production "dark, daunting and sensual" and commending its "stellar cast". Houston Press said it was "astonishingly good... a must see" while Culturemap listed the show as one of the "hottest" of the year.

Equus opened at the Menier Chocolate Factory in London, in a new revival by Lindsay Posner, from May to June 2026,, starring Toby Stephens as Dysart and Noah Valentine as Alan Strang. It subsequently transferred to the Theatre Royal, Bath, in July 2026.

The Sydney University Dramatic Society, one of the oldest student theatre associations, revived Equus in October 2026 - the first time the play had been produced by the company since it was written. This production, directed by students Tomas Crennan and Jemma Ryan and starring Rayyan Khan and Reuben Kemp-Burrows received positive reviews. Honi Soit claimed that "this masterful production blurs – in a meta fashion – the boundary between student and professional theatre". Ricky Onsman praised Khan's performance as "outstanding" and "assured", and Kemp-Burrows as "undertaking the part wholeheartedly and without reservation".

== Awards and nominations ==
=== Original Broadway production ===
Year	Award ceremony	Category	Nominee	Result
1975	Tony Award	Best Play		Won
1975	Tony Award	Best Performance by a Leading Actor in a Play	Peter Firth	Nominated
1975	Tony Award	Best Performance by Featured Actress in a Play	Frances Sternhagen	Nominated
1975	Tony Award	Best Direction of a Play	John Dexter	Won
1975	Tony Award	Best Lighting Design	Andy Phillips	Nominated
1975	Drama Desk Award	Outstanding Play		Won
1975	Drama Desk Award	Outstanding Actor in a Play	Anthony Hopkins	Won
1975	Drama Desk Award	Outstanding Actor in a Play	Peter Firth	Nominated
1975	Drama Desk Award	Outstanding Featured Actress in a Play	Frances Sternhagen	Won
1975	Drama Desk Award	Outstanding Director of a Play	John Dexter	Won
1975	Drama Desk Award	Outstanding Set Design	John Napier	Nominated
1975	Drama Desk Award	Outstanding Costume Design	John Napier	Nominated
1975	Drama Desk Award	Outstanding Lighting Design	Andy Phillips	Nominated
1975	Outer Critics Circle Award	Outstanding Play		Won
1975	Outer Critics Circle Award	Outstanding Performance	Anthony Hopkins	Won
1975	Outer Critics Circle Award	Outstanding Performance	Peter Firth	Won
1975	Outer Critics Circle Award	Special Award	Peter Firth	Won
1975	New York Drama Critics' Circle	Best Play	Peter Shaffer	Won
1975	Theatre World Award		Peter Firth	Won
