= John Dexter =

English stage director (1925–1990)

John Dexter (2 August 1925 – 23 March 1990) was an English theatre, opera and film director, described in a 100th anniversary tribute as "one of the towering directors in the English-speaking theatre in the second half of the 20th century". He was associate director of the Royal National Theatre from 1963 to 1966 and from 1971 to 1975, and director of production from 1974 to 1981 and the production adviser to 1984 at the Metropolitan Opera.

== Theatre ==
Born in Derby, Derbyshire, England, Dexter left school at the age of fourteen and served in the British Army during the Second World War. Following the war, during which he contracted polio while in Egypt, he began working as a stage actor before turning to producing and directing shows for repertory companies. In 1957, he was appointed Associate Director of the English Stage Company based at the Royal Court.

Dexter's first great success was his premiere production of Roots at the Belgrade Theatre, Coventry in May 1959, which brought Joan Plowright to prominence. He went on to direct Toys in the Attic (with Wendy Hiller, 1960) and Saint Joan (1963). In 1964, he was named Associate Director of the National Theatre of Great Britain, and in July produced Peter Shaffer's The Royal Hunt of the Sun at the Chichester Festival Theatre.

That year, he also directed Othello, with Sir Laurence Olivier, Maggie Smith and Frank Finlay. It was considered a tremendous success. RCA recorded an audio version, and, the following year, Stuart Burge made a film of the production (now available on DVD) for BHE Films.

Dexter continued with Hamlet (with music by Conrad Susa, 1969), the premiere production of Equus (one of his triumphs, 1973), Trevor Griffiths's The Party (Lord Olivier's final stage appearance, 1973), Phaedra Britannica (with his friend, Diana Rigg, 1975), The Merchant (aka, Shylock, 1977), As You Like It (with music by Harrison Birtwistle, 1979), Life of Galileo (with Sir Michael Gambon, 1980), The Glass Menagerie (with Jessica Tandy, 1983) and Julius Caesar (1988). His final great success was M. Butterfly (1988), on Broadway, and the following year, he staged Die Dreigroschenoper there (with Sting as Macheath and conducted by Julius Rudel), which was to be his final production.

Other plays directed by him included Do I Hear a Waltz?, Le Misanthrope,. and Pygmalion, the latter both with Diana Rigg and Alex McCowen, the Shaw later issued on 2 LPs by Argo. When he left the National Theatre, the critic Kenneth Tynan, asked who might replace him, replied "no one can replace John Dexter.

== Cinema ==
Dexter's debut feature-film was The Virgin Soldiers (with Lynn Redgrave, 1969). His second film was The Sidelong Glances of a Pigeon Kicker (aka, Pigeons, with Elaine Stritch, 1970); his third was I Want What I Want (1972).

For Granada Television, Dexter directed Twelfth Night, with Sir Alec Guinness and Sir Ralph Richardson in 1969.

== Opera ==
Dexter made his operatic debut at the Royal Opera, Covent Garden, in 1966, with Benvenuto Cellini, with Nicolai Gedda and conducted by John Pritchard, and, in 1983, he staged a double-bill of Le rossignol (with Natalia Makarova) and L'enfant et les sortilèges for the company. At the Hamburg State Opera, he was invited by Rolf Liebermann to stage Les vêpres siciliennes (1969), the success of which led to his return to direct From the House of the Dead (1972), Billy Budd (with Richard Stilwell, 1972), Boris Godunov (in the Shostakovich edition, 1972) and Un ballo in maschera (with Luciano Pavarotti and Sherrill Milnes, 1973). For Sadler's Wells Opera, he produced the UK premiere of The Devils of Loudun at the London Coliseum in 1973, with Josephine Barstow and Geoffrey Chard.

At the Metropolitan Opera (where he was Director of Production from 1974 to 1981, then Production Advisor from 1981 to 1984), Dexter mounted new productions of Les vêpres siciliennes (with Montserrat Caballé, 1974), Aïda (with Leontyne Price, 1976), Le prophète (with Marilyn Horne, 1977), Dialogues des Carmélites (1977), the first production there of Lulu (1977), Rigoletto (with Cornell MacNeil and Plácido Domingo, 1977), Billy Budd (with Sir Peter Pears, 1978), The Bartered Bride (with Teresa Stratas and Jon Vickers, 1978), Don Pasquale (with Beverly Sills, 1978), Don Carlos (with Renata Scotto, 1979), Die Entführung aus dem Serail (with Edda Moser, later Zdzisława Donat, 1979), Aufstieg und Fall der Stadt Mahagonny (1979) and the triple-bills (both designed by David Hockney) of "Parade" (Parade/Les mamelles de Tirésias/L'enfant et les sortilèges, 1981) and "Stravinsky" (Le sacre du printemps/Le rossignol/Œdipus rex, 1981).

For the Paris Opéra, he staged Les vêpres siciliennes (1974) and La forza del destino (1975).

In Zurich, he produced Nabucco in 1986, his last operatic production.

== Life ==
In 1978, the Hamburg-based Alfred Toepfer Foundation awarded Dexter its annual Shakespeare Prize in recognition of his life's work. John Dexter died in London during heart surgery; he had also been afflicted with poliomyelitis and diabetes. His acerbic and witty autobiography, The Honourable Beast, was published posthumously, in which he wrote of his "Fury for perfection...."

== Broadway productions ==
- The Threepenny Opera (1989 revival)
- M. Butterfly (1988)
- The Glass Menagerie (1983 revival)
- One Night Stand (1980, "never officially opened")
- The Merchant (1977)
- The Misanthrope (1975 revival)
- Equus (1974)
- The Unknown Soldier and His Wife (1967)
- Black Comedy/White Liars (1967)
- The Royal Hunt of the Sun (1965)
- Do I Hear a Waltz? (1965)
- Chips With Everything (1963)

== Awards and nominations ==
Year	Award	Category	Work	Result
1967	Tony Award	Best Direction of a Play	The White Lies	Nominated
1973	Taormina Film Fest		The Sidelong Glances of a Pigeon Kicker	Nominated
1975	Tony Award	Best Direction of a Play	Equus	Won
1975	Drama Desk Award	Outstanding Director of a Play	Equus	Won
1988	Tony Award	Best Direction of a Play	M. Butterfly	Won
1988	Drama Desk Award	Outstanding Director of a Play	M. Butterfly	Won

== See also ==
- List of English speaking theatre directors in the 20th and 21st centuries
- Theatre of the United Kingdom
- History of theatre
