= Doug Hughes =

American theatre director

Douglas Hughes is an American theatre director.

== Early life ==
Hughes is the son of acting couple Barnard Hughes (1915–2006) and Helen Stenborg. He attended Harvard University, starting as a biology major and graduating with a degree in English.

== Career ==
Hughes worked for 12 years as the associate artistic director of Seattle Repertory Theatre, from 1984 to 1996, under Daniel Sullivan. The Los Angeles Times noted: "Hughes has a transparent style, emphasizing story and character, not flashy gestures. Lynne Meadow, artistic director of Manhattan Theatre Club, said that he is 'a wonderful director and smart guy.' " Hughes was the artist-in-residence at the New School for Drama, New York City, in 2007/08. He has been the associate artistic director of the Manhattan Theatre Club and director of artistic planning of the Guthrie Theater. He was the artistic director at the Long Wharf Theatre from 1997 to 2001. Hughes has directed both Off-Broadway and on Broadway.

He directed The Grey Zone by Tim Blake Nelson Off-Broadway at the MCC Theater in 1996, and won the 1995/96 Obie Award for Direction. In 2004 and 2005, Hughes directed Doubt: A Parable Off-Broadway and on Broadway, for which he won the 2005 Drama Desk Award for Outstanding Director of a Play, and the 2005 Tony Award for Best Direction of a Play.

In 2005, he directed the Richard Greenburg Broadway debut of A Naked Girl on the Appian Way.

In 2009, Hughes directed the Beau Willimon play Farragut North, starring Chris Pine and Chris Noth at Geffen Playhouse in Los Angeles.

As a Resident Director of the Roundabout Theatre, he has directed many plays for the Roundabout, including The Big Knife in 2013 and Mrs. Warren's Profession in 2010.

He directed Frozen in 2004 at the Circle in the Square on Broadway and at the MCC Theater Off-Broadway, receiving a nomination for the 2004 Tony Award, Direction of a Play, and 2004 Outer Critics Circle Award nomination, Outstanding Director of a Play. He directed the musical Death Takes a Holiday Off-Broadway in 2011, and received a nomination for the 2012 Drama Desk Award, Outstanding Director of a Musical. He directed Inherit the Wind in 2007 at the Lyceum Theatre, and was nominated for the 2007 Drama Desk Award, Outstanding Director of a Play. He has directed several plays for the Manhattan Theatre Club, including Outside Mullingar in 2014, and The Father in 2015/16.

He directed the new play by Ayad Akhtar Junk: The Golden Age of Debt in its world premiere at La Jolla Playhouse in 2016 and on Broadway in 2017.
