= Melvin Bernhardt =

American director (1931–2015)

Melvin Bernhardt (February 26, 1931 – September 12, 2015) was an American stage and television director. He was born and raised in Buffalo, New York, and much of his work has been in the New York City area. He is known for his productions of The Effect of Gamma Rays on Man-in-the-Moon Marigolds, Da, and Crimes of the Heart. Bernhardt began his career as a stage manager; he made his directorial debut in 1965 with Conerico was Here to Stay at the Cherry Lane Theatre.

== Biography ==
Melvin Bernhard (he later added the "t" to his surname in tribute to Sarah Bernhardt) was born on February 26, 1931 in Buffalo, New York. His parents were Max Bernhard and Kate Benatovich. He obtained his Bachelor of Arts degree from the University at Buffalo and his Master of Fine Arts degree from Yale University. Beginning January 8, 1989 Bernhardt was partnered with New York based stage/television actor and audiobook narrator Jeff Woodman. The pair were married on September 10, 2011.

Bernhardt died in Manhattan, New York on September 12, 2015 after a fall at the age of 84.

== Career ==
Melvin Bernhardt began his career as a stage manager. He served as the stage manager for the original Broadway theatre productions of Diary of a Scoundrel and Livin' the Life. Bernhardt directed his first play, Conerico was Here to Stay, at the Cherry Lane Theatre in Manhattan in 1965. From there, Bernhardt directed plays throughout the United States, including productions in Hartford and Cincinnati and a national tour of Who's Happy Now? in 1968. He made his London directing debut in November 1972 at the Hampstead Theatre Club with his production of The Effect of Gamma Rays on Man-in-the-Moon Marigolds. Bernhardt is known as an "actor's director", as he focuses more on character development than on elaborate staging. He is currently a member of the Honorary Advisory Committee of the Stage Directors and Choreographers Society.

=== Broadway ===
In addition to winning multiple Obie awards for his Off-Broadway work, Bernhardt has had a successful career as a Broadway theatre director. His first Broadway production came in 1969 when he directed Home Fires and Cop-Out, a pair of one-act plays written by John Guare. The production, which was staged at the Cort Theatre, was harshly criticized and closed after just eight performances. Although the individual performances of the actors were well received, the plays themselves were seen as "enigmatic drama", "weak social satire", and "feeble exercises in juvenility".

1 May 1978 marked the debut of the original Broadway production of Da, a comedy by Hugh Leonard which proved to be one of the more successful plays in Bernhardt's career. The play, which ran for nearly 700 performances at the Morosco Theatre, earned Bernhardt the 1978 Tony Award for Best Direction of a Play and the 1978 Drama Desk Award for Outstanding Director of a Play. Bernhardt's other major Broadway success was Crimes of the Heart, which opened at the John Golden Theatre on 4 November 1981. The production earned a slew of awards and nominations, including nominations for the 1981 Drama Desk Award for Outstanding Direction of a Play and the 1982 Tony Award for Best Direction of a Play.

=== Television ===
Although the majority of Bernhardt's directorial work has taken place on the stage, he has also had some experience in television directing. His work on Another World earned him a nomination for the 1979 and 1980 Daytime Emmy Award for Outstanding Drama Series Directing Team. He earned another nomination for this award in 1985 for his work on One Life to Live. Other television work includes several episodes of All My Children, and, in 1984, a live production of Mister Roberts for NBC Live Theater.
