= British Theatre Association =

The British Theatre Association, originally known as the British Drama League, was an organisation established in 1919 to promote amateur and professional theatre in England, with a head office based at Fitzroy Square, London. It was founded by Geoffrey Whitworth. Its work included pursuing the creation of the National Theatre, offering library and research services, founded the journal Drama in 1919, and encouraging the introduction of drama into the national curriculum. Its name was changed to the British Theatre Association in 1972. The Association was disbanded in 1990, due to financial pressures. Play scripts held in its archive are now in the possession of the Theatre Museum, London.
