= A Delicate Balance (play) =

1966 play written by American Edward Albee

- Broadway revival poster by James McMullan
- Original language: English
- Written by: Edward Albee
- Characters: Agnes; Tobias; Claire; Edna; Harry; Julia
- Subject: Dysfunction in suburbia
- Genre: Drama
- Setting: An upper-middle-class home

Premiere
- Date: September 22, 1966
- Place: Martin Beck Theatre; New York City

A Delicate Balance is a three-act play by Edward Albee, written in 1965 and 1966. Premiered in 1966, it won the Pulitzer Prize for Drama in 1967, the first of three he received for his work.

The uneasy existence of upper-middle-class suburbanites Agnes and Tobias and their permanent houseguest, Agnes's witty and alcoholic sister Claire, is disrupted by the sudden appearance of lifelong family friends Harry and Edna, fellow empty nesters with free-floating anxiety, who ask to stay with them to escape an unnamed terror. They soon are followed by Agnes and Tobias's bitter 36-year-old daughter Julia, who returns home following the collapse of her fourth marriage.

== Plot and summary ==
=== Act I ===
Agnes, an upper-class woman in her late 50s, discusses the possibility of losing her mind. Agnes exclaims that although she is astonished by her own thoughts of madness, it is her sister, Claire, who lives with them, who astonishes her the most. Claire appears and apologizes to Agnes that her own nature is such to bring out in her sister the full force of her brutality. Claire senses that Tobias and Agnes's daughter Julia might be going on her fourth divorce and predicts that Julia will be coming home shortly. Agnes reenters, announcing that Julia is coming home. Tobias then tells the story of a cat that he once had. There is a knock on the door. Harry and Edna, Agnes and Tobias's best friends, arrive and ask if they can stay there. They have been frightened by something intangible.

=== Act II ===
Agnes and Julia are discussing the fact that Harry and Edna are occupying Julia's old bedroom. Harry and Edna have spent the entire day in the room. Julia whines to Tobias next about not having her room. Claire enters and chides Julia about her new divorce. Julia teases Claire back about her drinking. After asking Tobias for a drink, she announces that “there is no point in pressing” the issue of Harry and Edna. At the end of scene 1, Harry and Edna appear with their coats over their arms. They announce they are going home but will return with their suitcases. Scene 2 opens with Julia and Agnes alone after dinner. Julia is disgusted with her mother's desire to control everyone's conversations and emotions. Agnes retorts, “There is a balance to be maintained...and I must be the fulcrum.” Agnes and Tobias leave to help Harry and Edna unload their suitcases from their car. Edna enters and tells Julia that it is time for her to grow up. Julia reminds Edna that she is a guest in the house, and Edna responds that she and Harry are Agnes and Tobias's best friends. When Harry enters, he goes to fix everyone a drink at the bar. Julia blocks him from the bar and insists that he stay away from it. Julia yells “I WANT...WHAT IS MINE!” and leaves the room. Agnes reminisces about the death of her son. She suspects that Tobias has been unfaithful, and asks Harry and Claire to confirm it, but they both deny it. After Tobias attempts to excuse Julia as being in hysterics, Julia reappears with a gun in her hand. She insists that Harry and Edna leave. Edna declares, “We have rights here. We belong,” and insists that she and Harry are staying there forever, “if need be.”

=== Act III ===
Tobias has stayed up all night, and is making himself a morning cocktail. Agnes comes down from her room. She tells Tobias that it is his role to make all the decisions with regards to what to do about Edna and Harry. She reminds Tobias of the time when he prevented her from getting pregnant after the death of their son. Claire, Julia, Tobias, and Agnes all discuss their versions of why Harry and Edna are there and what they should do about it. Harry and Edna join them, and everyone in the room is drinking. Edna announces that Harry wants to talk to Tobias alone, and the women exit. Harry tells Tobias that if the circumstances were reversed, he and Edna don’t think they would allow Tobias and Agnes to live at their house in spite of the fact that they are best friends. Harry asks Tobias, “You don’t want us, do you, Toby?” Tobias answers that he does not really want Harry and Edna to stay there but that Harry and Edna have the right to be there because they are friends. He goes with Harry to get their suitcases and put them back in their car. Agnes says to Edna, “Everything becomes..too late, finally.” The play ends on Agnes's rumination that people sleep at night because they are afraid of the dark: “They say we sleep to let the demons out, to let the mind go raving mad, and when the daylight comes again... comes order with it.”

== Characters and cast ==
Notable casts

Character	Broadway debut (1966)	Broadway revival (1996)	West End debut (1997)	West End revival (2011)	2nd Broadway revival (2014)
Agnes	Jessica Tandy	Rosemary Harris	Eileen Atkins	Penelope Wilton	Glenn Close
Claire	Rosemary Murphy	Elaine Stritch	Maggie Smith	Imelda Staunton	Lindsay Duncan
Edna	Carmen Matthews	Elizabeth Wilson	Annette Crosbie	Diana Hardcastle	Clare Higgins
Harry	Henderson Forsythe	John Carter	James Laurenson	Ian McElhinney	Bob Balaban
Julia	Marian Seldes	Mary Beth Hurt	Sian Thomas	Lucy Cohu	Martha Plimpton
Tobias	Hume Cronyn	George Grizzard	John Standing	Tim Pigott-Smith	John Lithgow

=== Agnes ===
Agnes is the main female character of the play. She is a woman in her 50s, well off, and married to Tobias. She is also the mother of Julia and the sister of Claire. Agnes believes herself to be the fulcrum of the family, keeping everyone in balance. She often maintains this balance, or order, by not confronting issues, not taking a stand, and not processing emotions. She tries to keep the peace by not dealing with anything that might upset it.

On the surface, Agnes is completely supportive of her husband Tobias. She looks to him to confirm her thoughts, and likewise, she confirms his. It is not until near the end of the play that she brings up issues that show cracks in her relationship with her husband. When the memory of the death of her son is brought to the surface of her thoughts, she reminisces about how difficult a time that was for her, a time when she questioned everything, including her husband's love and faithfulness to her.

Although she feels as if she is the fulcrum, Agnes begins and ends the play on her musings of insanity. She wonders if she could just suddenly slip off into madness and what that would be like. She wonders what her husband would do if that happened. Would she be an embarrassment to him? Embarrassment is a very large issue with Agnes. She is easily embarrassed by her sister Claire, who Agnes believes has wasted her life and her potential. When Claire insists that she is not an alcoholic, Agnes states sarcastically, “that’s very nice.” Then she lists times that Claire has vomited, fallen down, and called from the club to have someone come and get her. She concludes this commentary with the words: “If we change for the worse with drink, we are an alcoholic.”

Agnes's relationship with her daughter Julia does not fare much better. Julia also embarrasses her mother. When Julia becomes hysterical, Tobias asks Agnes to go talk to their daughter. Agnes's response is “I haven’t the time.” Instead of empathizing with Julia, Agnes becomes more self-absorbed. She tells her husband that she has suffered far more than her daughter. This same self-absorption is apparent in all of Agnes's relationships. She easily becomes lost in self-pity and at the same time believes herself to be above everyone around her. If she is the fulcrum of the balance in the family, Albee portrays her as a very unstable one. Albee has admitted that the character of Agnes is based on his real-life adopted mother.

=== Claire ===
Claire is Agnes's younger sister. She claims that she is not an alcoholic but rather a willful drinker. Of all the characters in the play, whether it is due to the alcohol or not, Claire has the loosest tongue. She speaks her mind and is the least affected by social politeness.

Claire lives with Agnes and Tobias and appears to have no means of support except for them. Her main role in life seems to be to annoy and embarrass her sister. She is everything that Agnes dislikes. Claire makes the statement, after telling Tobias that he would be better off if he killed Agnes, Julia, and herself, that she will never know whether she wants to live until Agnes is dead. With this statement, Albee makes it sound as if Claire holds Agnes up as a role model, a model that she has never been able to reach. And instead of trying to reach it, she has done everything to live her life in a diametrically opposed manner.

Claire's relationship with Julia is closer than her relationship with anyone else. She and Julia identify with one another in their roles as the “other”—people on the periphery of Tobias's and Agnes's lives. Claire and Julia are the rebels, the failures, the embarrassments that must be tolerated. When Julia arrives home, Claire greets her more honestly, more warmly than do Julia's parents.

Despite Claire's open disdain for her sister, she has never told Agnes about Tobias's affair. It is not clear if she does this out of love or out of spite. She keeps the affair a secret, almost as if she has a hidden weapon that she protects in case she may have to use it one day. When Agnes comes right out and asks Claire to confirm her suspicions about Tobias, Claire's answer is, “Ya got me, Sis.” Shortly after this exchange, Agnes describes Claire in this way: “Claire could tell us so much if she cared to...Claire, who watches from the sidelines, has seen so very much, has seen us all so clearly...You were not named for nothing.” Claire is said to closely resemble Albee's aunt Jane, an alcoholic and frequent visitor to the Albee home.

=== Edna ===
Edna is Harry's wife. It is not clear if she is really Agnes's friend or if she and Agnes know one another only because their husbands are friends. Edna arrives one day at the door of Agnes and Tobias's home. She takes it for granted that they will let her and Harry stay there for however long it takes them to get over their unnamed fear.

Despite the fact that the relationship between Edna and Agnes is not clear (their names are very similar), Edna sometimes takes on the role of mother to Julia. Although Edna's manner is dissimilar, her sentiments are comparable to Agnes's. Edna is not afraid to voice her opinions. Edna tells Julia that she is no longer a child and should take more responsibility for her life. She also declares that Julia no longer has rights in her parents’ house.

Edna also confronts Agnes and tells her to stop making fun of her and her husband Harry. Although Edna may not be able to name the fear that has driven her out of her own house, she appears to be quite capable of naming the things that other people are doing wrong in their lives.

But then again, it is Edna, in the end, who realizes that there are boundaries, even between friends. She understands that there are some boundaries that should not be pushed, some things that “we may not do ... not ask, for fear of looking in a mirror.” And it is also through her reflection that the play resolves. Edna has looked into that mirror at the end of the play and has decided that if the tables were turned, if Agnes and Tobias had come to her, she would not have allowed them to stay at her house.

=== Harry ===
Harry is Edna's husband and Tobias's best friend. At one point in the past, Harry and Tobias, coincidentally, had an extramarital affair with the same young woman. Besides both having been businessmen and meeting at the same club, it is unclear what else Harry and Tobias have in common except that they have known one another for a long time and neither sleeps with his wife. Harry is something of a reflection of Tobias, but he is even more reserved. Of all the characters in this play, Harry speaks the least. And when he does speak, he is a man of few words with pauses around each one. He prefers to talk around things rather than going at them straight on. He also avoids questions, like when Agnes tries to find out why he and his wife have come to their home. Instead of giving Agnes an answer, he compliments the furnishings in Agnes's home. He also has the tendency to repeat himself; at one point he repeats the same line four times when he tries to explain how fear has driven his wife and him out of their home. It is Harry, in the end, who tells Tobias that he and Edna have decided to leave. Although Harry prompted the discussion with Edna about resolving the issue of staying at their friends’ house, it is implied that Edna made the decision and that Harry just delivered the message.

=== Julia ===
Julia is the 36-year-old daughter of Agnes and Tobias. Three times divorced, she has recently left her fourth husband, and has returned home. Her father calls her a whiner, and her mother has little time for her. Julia has set a pattern in her life of marrying for the wrong reasons and then divorcing and returning home. Her parents welcome her, although they make it clear that they wish she would establish an independent life of her own.

Julia is the catalyst of the play. While the other characters either hide their emotions in alcohol or avoid confrontations by smothering their feelings in banal talk, Julia brings matters to the forefront. She has wants, and she demands that they be at least heard, if not satisfied. The most obvious thing that she wants in this play is her bedroom in her parents’ home. However, upon her return, she discovers that her room is being occupied by Edna and Harry, her parents’ so-called best friends. In her attempts to regain control of her bedroom, Julia makes everyone confront the issues of the play, namely defining relationships, wants, needs, and rights. At one point, Julia forces the issue first by having an emotional tantrum, then by upsetting the furniture and all the clothes in her bedroom, and finally by threatening everyone with a gun.

Julia tends to put down her mother and commiserate with her mother's sister Claire. Julia acts as if she is Claire's friend until Claire points her finger at Julia and lets her know that Julia is as much a visitor in her parents’ home as Harry and Edna are.

Julia, Claire, Harry, and Edna are portrayed as invaders in the lives of Agnes and Tobias. They all have their own reasons for needing to be there: None of them is able to make it alone in the outside world. Julia falls back on her childhood to claim her spot, even though she is nearing middle age. She has little empathy for the others who are also seeking comfort in the same house. The character of Julia is based on Barbara Lauder, one of Albee's cousins.

=== Tobias ===
Tobias is Agnes's husband and the father of Julia. He is a well-to-do, retired businessman. Although he is tolerant of people around him, he, like his wife, tends to avoid emotional topics. His tolerance toward his sister-in-law Claire is shown in his nonjudgmental attitude toward her drinking. Although he encourages her to return to Alcoholics Anonymous at one point in the play, he does not berate her for drinking. In some ways, he even encourages it or at least does not discourage it. There are a few subtle insinuations that Claire and Tobias might have at one time had an affair, but this is initially only alluded to by script directions that have Claire open her arms to Tobias in a “casual invitation”. Later in the play, Agnes asks Tobias (when he cannot sleep) if he went to Claire.

Whether Tobias had an affair with Claire is not certain; however, his infidelity is. Claire knows about an affair that Tobias had with a young woman, but she has never told Agnes about it. Claire only uses the information to taunt Tobias. Some critics have suggested that the young anonymous woman with whom Tobias had the affair was actually Claire. Despite all this, Tobias appears secure in his marriage with Agnes, even though they have not shared the same bed for many years. Their marriage seems to have become something of a habit. Tobias shows very little affection to his wife except in the way that he reinforces her thoughts, giving her assurances, for instance, that she, of all people, should not worry about going mad.

Tobias appears to be closer to his daughter than Agnes is. However, the degree of intimacy is not considerably greater. Tobias is the more concerned parent when Julia becomes hysterical, although he does nothing but ask Agnes to console her. It is Tobias who takes the gun away from his daughter, and it is Tobias to whom Julia apologizes for her outburst.

If Agnes is the fulcrum, then Tobias is the energy behind the fulcrum that works at keeping a balance in this dysfunctional family. He is constantly asking people to talk kindlier about one another. Or, in the least, it is Tobias who keeps silent while fury flares around him. It is also Tobias who serves everyone drinks as if trying to soften the edges of their grievances with alcohol.

It is Tobias's friend Harry (and his wife, Edna) who bring the play to its conclusion, forcing Tobias to define what friendship is all about. In the end, Tobias proclaims that friendship is not about wants but rather about rights. Tobias's friend Harry has the right to move into Tobias's house even if that is not what Tobias, or the rest of his family, wants. Contradicting this conclusion is the story concerning his cat that Tobias tells in the middle of the play. In this case, the cat wanted to be left alone. Tobias was uncomfortable with the cat's noncompliance, and eventually he hits the cat and then has the cat euthanised. But disregarding the cat, Tobias seems true to his definition of friendship. He has, after all, allowed his sister-in-law to live off him. He allows his 30-something daughter to continually move in and out of his house, and he tolerates his wife. He also tolerates his friend Harry's moving into his house uninvited. At the end of the play, Tobias questions Harry's efforts at friendship and honesty. Then he apologizes. Albee admits that the character of Tobias is based on his adopted father.

== Productions ==
The original Broadway production, directed by Alan Schneider, opened at the Martin Beck Theatre on September 22, 1966, and closed on January 14, 1967, after 132 performances and 12 previews. The cast included Hume Cronyn as Tobias, Jessica Tandy as Agnes, Rosemary Murphy as Claire, Henderson Forsythe as Harry, Carmen Mathews as Edna, and Marian Seldes as Julia. The scenic design was by William Ritman, costumes by Theoni V. Aldredge, and lighting by Tharon Musser.

A revival produced by Lincoln Center Theater at the Plymouth Theatre opened on April 21, 1996, and ran for 185 performances and 27 previews. It was directed by Gerald Gutierrez, and starred Rosemary Harris as Agnes, George Grizzard as Tobias, John Carter as Harry, Elizabeth Wilson as Edna, Elaine Stritch as Claire, and Mary Beth Hurt as Julia. The production won the Tony Award for Best Revival of a Play, as well as Tony Awards for Grizzard and Gutierrez, and the Drama Desk Award for Outstanding Revival of a Play.

A 1973 film adaptation was directed by Tony Richardson for the short-lived American Film Theater series. It starred Katharine Hepburn, Paul Scofield, Lee Remick, Joseph Cotten, and Kate Reid.

A production previewed in the West End at the Theatre Royal Haymarket from October 15, 1997, opened on October 21, 1997, and closed on April 4, 1998. It starred Eileen Atkins as Agnes, Maggie Smith as Claire, John Standing as Tobias, Annette Crosbie as Edna, Sian Thomas as Julia, and James Laurenson as Harry. Atkins won the Evening Standard Theatre Award for Best Actress for the play in 1998.

A 2011 revival was presented at the Almeida Theatre in Islington, London, directed by James Macdonald. The cast included Lucy Cohu (Julia), Diana Hardcastle (Edna), Ian McElhinney (Harry), Tim Pigott-Smith (Tobias), Imelda Staunton (Claire), and Penelope Wilton (Agnes).

A Delicate Balance was produced in 2013 at the McCarter Theater, with Edward Albee attending rehearsals and contributing minor rewrites. It featured Kathleen Chalfant as Agnes, John Glover as Tobias, and was directed by Emily Mann. Sets were designed by Daniel Ostling, costumes by Jennifer von Mayrhauser, and lighting by Lap Chi Chu.

A new revival directed by Pam MacKinnon ran on Broadway at the John Golden Theatre. Previews began on October 20, 2014, and it officially opened on November 20, 2014. Its last performance was February 22, 2015. The cast featured Glenn Close as Agnes, John Lithgow as Tobias, Martha Plimpton as Julia, Lindsay Duncan as Claire, Bob Balaban as Harry and Clare Higgins as Edna.

== Awards and nominations ==
=== Original Broadway production ===
Year	Award	Category	Nominee	Result
1967	Pulitzer Prize	Pulitzer Prize for Drama	Edward Albee	Won
1967	Tony Award	Best Play	Edward Albee	Nominated
1967	Tony Award	Best Actor in a Play	Hume Cronyn	Nominated
1967	Tony Award	Best Actress in a Play	Rosemary Murphy	Nominated
1967	Tony Award	Best Featured Actress in a Play	Marian Seldes	Won
1967	Tony Award	Best Direction of a Play	Alan Schneider	Nominated

=== 1996 Broadway revival ===
Year	Award	Category	Nominee	Result
1996	Drama Desk Award	Outstanding Revival of a Play	A Delicate Balance	Won
1996	Tony Award	Best Revival of a Play	Lincoln Center Theater, André Bishop and Bernard Gersten	Won
1996	Tony Award	Best Actor in a Play	George Grizzard	Won
1996	Tony Award	Best Actress in a Play	Rosemary Harris	Nominated
1996	Tony Award	Best Actress in a Play	Elaine Stritch	Nominated
1996	Tony Award	Best Scenic Design	John Lee Beatty	Nominated
1996	Tony Award	Best Costume Design	Jane Greenwood	Nominated

=== 1998 West End debut ===
Year	Award	Category	Nominee	Result
1998	Laurence Olivier Award	Best Actress	Maggie Smith	Nominated
