= Love! Valour! Compassion! =

1995 play written by Terrence McNally

- Original language: English
- Written by: Terrence McNally
- Characters: Gregory Mitchell; John Jeckyll; James Jeckyll; Perry Sellars; Buzz Hauser; Ramon Fornos; Arthur Pape; Bobby Brahms
- Genre: Comedy; Drama
- Setting: Summer holiday weekends; Dutchess County, New York

Premiere
- Date: October 11, 1994
- Place: Manhattan Theatre Club; New York City, New York

Love! Valour! Compassion! is a play by Terrence McNally. The play opened Off-Broadway in 1994 and transferred to Broadway in 1995. It won the Tony Award for Best Play and the Drama Desk Award for Outstanding Play.

== Productions ==
Love! Valour! Compassion! premiered Off-Broadway at the Manhattan Theatre Club on October 11, 1994, running for 72 performances. The production transferred to Broadway to the Walter Kerr Theatre on February 14, 1995, and closed on September 17, 1995, after 248 performances and 28 previews. Directed by Joe Mantello, the cast featured Nathan Lane (Buzz Hauser), John Glover (John and James Jeckyll), Stephen Bogardus (Gregory Mitchell), John Benjamin Hickey (Arthur Pape), Anthony Heald (Perry Sellars), Justin Kirk (Bobby), and Randy Becker (Ramon Fornos).

The play was produced and directed by Stephen Henry at the Edinburgh Festival Fringe and won The Stage Awards for Best Actor (Chris Pickles) and Best Ensemble. This production then ran in London at the Tristan Bates Theatre in October 1998.

== Plot ==
The setting is at a lakeside summer vacation house in Dutchess County, two hours north of New York City where eight gay friends spend the three major holiday weekends of one summer together for Memorial Day, Independence Day, and Labor Day. The house belongs to Gregory, a successful Broadway choreographer now approaching middle age, who fears he is losing his creativity; and his twenty-something lover, Bobby, a legal assistant who is blind. Each of the guests at their house is connected to Gregory's work in one way or another – Arthur and longtime partner Perry are business consultants; John Jeckyll, a sour Englishman, is a dance accompanist; die-hard musical theater fanatic Buzz Hauser is a costume designer and the most stereotypically gay man in the group. Only John's summer lover, Ramon, and John's twin brother James are outside the circle of friends. But Ramon is outgoing and eventually makes a place for himself in the group, and James is such a gentle soul that he is quickly welcomed.

== Critical response ==
Vincent Canby, in his review for The New York Times, wrote: "...it's utterly contemporary; its one-liners are sometimes hysterical and are slammed home with style, most often by the incomparable Nathan Lane; it has genuine pathos that's only slightly tinged with sentimentality, and, as a singular talking point, it offers more male nudity than has probably ever been seen in a legitimate Broadway theater."

== Analysis of characters ==
=== Gregory Mitchell ===
Gregory Mitchell is a middle-aged man celebrated Broadway dancer and choreographer. Now, with most of his career behind him Gregory is struggling with creativity and himself to find the energy for his last work. Gregory hosts Memorial Day, Fourth of July, and Labor Day at his century-old country home called "Manderlay" for relaxation and some time away from the city. Gregory's main struggles in the play are his love for Bobby, Bobby's betrayal, and his attempt to complete a major piece of choreography for a world premiere in New York.

=== Buzz Hauser ===
Buzz, a musical comedy enthusiast, provides the play with some of its most humorous and touching moments. Buzz works making costumes for Gregory's companies and volunteers time at a local AIDS clinic, and he is a great lover of Broadway musicals. Buzz is the type of guy that is always constantly singing a broadway song on the way to work or trying to work in a quote into a conversation. Although he jokes about being bad with relationships and claims to be done with finding love, he eventually falls in love with John's brother, James, who also has AIDS but is in a more advanced stage of the disease.

=== Bobby Brahms ===
Bobby is Gregory's boyfriend of four years. He is in his early twenties, which is much younger than Gregory. Despite the age difference, they share gentle demeanors, a passion for music, and a love for the natural surroundings at Gregory's house in the country. Blind since birth, Bobby does not let his handicap deter him, and he resists letting it define him.

=== James Jeckyll ===
James is John Jeckyll's twin brother and Buzz's lover. James is witty, generous, and self-deprecating and seems to care deeply about everyone he meets. James provides Buzz a final chance at a meaningful relationship, even though it is one that they both know will soon end from AIDS. However, in the brief time they have together, James manages to keep his optimism and give Buzz a new perspective on life.

== Film adaptation ==
In 1997, a film adaptation written by McNally reunited much of the original cast, with Jason Alexander and Stephen Spinella replacing Nathan Lane and Anthony Heald.

== Original Broadway production ==
Year	Award ceremony	Category	Nominee	Result
1995	Tony Award	Best Play	Terrence McNally	Won
1995	Tony Award	Best Performance by a Featured Actor in a Play	John Glover	Won
1995	Tony Award	Best Performance by a Featured Actor in a Play	Anthony Heald	Nominated
1995	Tony Award	Best Performance by a Featured Actor in a Play	Stephen Bogardus	Nominated
1995	Tony Award	Best Direction of a Play	Joe Mantello	Nominated
1995	Drama Desk Award	Outstanding Play	Terrence McNally	Won
1995	Drama Desk Award	Outstanding Featured Actor in a Play	Nathan Lane	Won
1995	Drama Desk Award	Outstanding Featured Actor in a Play	John Glover	Nominated
1995	Drama Desk Award	Outstanding Director of a Play	Joe Mantello	Nominated
1995	Drama Desk Award	Outstanding Costume Design	Jess Goldstein	Nominated
1995	Drama Desk Award	Outstanding Lighting Design	Brian McDevitt	Nominated
1995	Outer Critics Circle Award	Outstanding New Broadway Play		Won
1995	Outer Critics Circle Award	Outstanding Director of a Play	Joe Mantello	Won
1995	Outer Critics Circle Award	Outstanding Leading Actor	Nathan Lane	Won
1995	New York Drama Critics' Circle	Best American Play	Terrence McNally	Won
1995	Obie Award	Best Performance		Won
1995	Obie Award	Best Playwright		Won
1995	Evening Standard Theatre Awards	Best Play		Won
