= Pam MacKinnon =

Theatre director

- Born: January 8, 1968 (age 58); Chicago, Illinois, U.S.
- Education: University of Toronto (BA); University of California, San Diego (attended)
- Occupation: Theatre director

Pam MacKinnon (born January 9, 1968) is a Tony-Award winning American theatre director. She has directed for the stage off-Broadway, on Broadway and in regional theatre. She won the Obie Award for Directing and received a Tony Award nomination for her work as director of Clybourne Park. In 2013 she received the Tony Award for Best Direction of a Play for a revival of Who's Afraid of Virginia Woolf? She led the American Conservatory Theater (A.C.T) in San Francisco, California as its fourth Artistic Director starting in January 23, 2018. She departed the company at the end fo their 2025-2026 season to focus on her directing career.

== Biography ==
=== Early life ===
MacKinnon is a native of Chicago and was raised in suburban Buffalo, New York. She majored in economics and political science at the University of Toronto and enrolled in a political science Ph.D. program at the University of California, San Diego, but left to work with Des McAnuff and Anne Bogart in San Diego. She studied at the Lincoln Center Directors' Lab and the Drama League.

=== Career ===
MacKinnon has directed many plays by Edward Albee, including the premiere of his Peter and Jerry at the Second Stage Theatre (2007) (and also at Hartford Stage), and his Occupant (2008) by the Signature Theatre Company. Additional Albee works that she has directed include: A Delicate Balance (2009) at the Arena Stage, Washington, DC, and The Goat, or Who Is Sylvia? at the Alley Theatre, Houston, Texas, in 2003. The Houston Chronicle reviewer wrote of MacKinnon's direction of The Goat: "Director Pam MacKinnon negotiates the shifting tone as expertly as Albee has written it." She directed Albee's The Play About the Baby (2002) by the Philadelphia Theatre Company, Philadelphia and at the Goodman Theatre (2003). The Philadelphia Inquirer reviewer wrote that MacKinnon "...displays an unerring understanding of the play's moods and rhythms."

She directed Clybourne Park at the Off-Broadway Playwrights Horizons in 2010, winning the 2010 Obie Award for Directing. The play won the 2011 Pulitzer Prize for Drama. She directed the Broadway production of Clybourne Park, receiving a nomination for the 2012 Tony Award, Best Direction of a Play. In the Fall of 2011 she directed David Bar Katz's The Atmosphere of Memory, starring Ellen Burstyn and John Glover at The LAByrinth Theater Company.

In regional theatre she directed Death of a Salesman at the Old Globe Theatre, San Diego, which ran from January 22, 2011, to February 27, 2011. At the South Coast Repertory, Costa Mesa, California, she directed Itamar Moses' Completeness (2011),Gina Gionfriddo's Becky Shaw (2010), and Richard Greenberg's Our Mother's Brief Affair (2009)

MacKinnon directed three plays by Horton Foote under the umbrella title of Harrison, TX: Three Plays by Horton Foote for Primary Stages at 59E59 Theaters, New York City, with performances running from July to September 2012.

MacKinnon directed a production of Who's Afraid of Virginia Woolf? at the Steppenwolf Theatre, Chicago with performances starting in December 2010. She directed the production on Broadway at the Booth Theatre, which ran from September 2012 (previews) to March 3, 2013. MacKinnon won the Tony Award, Best Direction of a Play.

She directed the 2014 Broadway revival of Edward Albee's A Delicate Balance starring Glenn Close, John Lithgow and Martha Plimpton. The show ran from October 2014 (previews) to February 22, 2015, at the John Golden Theatre.

MacKinnon directed the world premiere of Amélie, a new musical based on the 2001 film, which premiered at Berkeley Repertory Theatre in September 2015. The book is by Craig Lucas, Daniel Messé (of Hem) wrote the music and Messé and Nathan Tysen wrote the lyrics. The musical opened on Broadway in March 2017 in previews, and closed on May 21, 2017. Subsequently, she directed the Broadway production of the new play The Parisian Woman by Beau Willimon, starring Uma Thurman, Josh Lucas, Blair Brown and Phillipa Soo. The play opened November 30, 2017 and closed on March 11, 2018.

She is chairwoman of the executive board of Clubbed Thumb, which "commissions, develops, and produces funny, strange, and provocative new plays by living American writers." She became the artistic director of the American Conservatory Theater (San Francisco) effective July 2018. Her first work as director at ACT was Seascape in January 2019. The reviewer for The San Francisco Examiner wrote: "...new artistic director Pam MacKinnon is to Edward Albee, and her affinity for (and previous professional relationship with) the late American playwright is evident in his Pulitzer Prize winner 'Seascape,' her first directorial venture in her new post... In the hands of MacKinnon and the cast, it's all hilarious and often poignant."

== Awards and nominations ==
Source: Playbillvault

- 2010, 2012 Clybourne Park - Obie Award (Winner), Lucille Lortel Award (nominee) and Tony Award (nominee)
- 2013 Who's Afraid of Virginia Woolf? Tony Award (Winner) and Drama Desk Award (Winner); Outer Critics Circle (nominee)
