= The Heiress (1947 play) =

1947 play by Ruth and Augustus Goetz

- Original language: English
- Written by: Ruth Goetz; Augustus Goetz
- Subject: Period 1850 heiress slowly gathers confidence in order to take her revenge
- Genre: Drama
- Setting: 1850, the home of Doctor Sloper in Washington Square

Premiere
- Date: September 29, 1947
- Place: Biltmore Theatre; New York City

The Heiress is a 1947 play by American playwrights Ruth and Augustus Goetz adapted from the 1880 Henry James novel Washington Square. Two years later, the play was adapted into the film The Heiress starring Olivia de Havilland.

== Productions ==
The play opened on Broadway at the Biltmore Theatre on September 29, 1947, and closed on September 18, 1948, after 410 performances. Directed by Jed Harris, the cast included Wendy Hiller and Basil Rathbone. The play then opened in London at the Theatre Royal, Haymarket on February 1, 1949; directed by John Gielgud, it starred Ralph Richardson and Peggy Ashcroft and ran for 644 performances, until August 19, 1950. In January 1950, Richardson and Ashcroft were replaced by Godfrey Tearle and Wendy Hiller.

The play has been revived four times on Broadway:

- February 8, 1950, to February 19, 1950, at the New York City Center – 16 performances
- April 20, 1976, to May 9, 1976, at the Broadhurst Theatre – 23 performances
- March 9, 1995, to December 31, 1995, at the Cort Theatre – 340 performances and 33 previews
- November 1, 2012, to February 9, 2013, at the Walter Kerr Theatre – 117 performances

The 1995 production starred Cherry Jones as Catherine Sloper, Philip Bosco as Dr. Austin Sloper, Jon Tenney/Michael Cumpsty as Morris Townsend, and Frances Sternhagen as Lavinia Penniman and was directed by Gerald Gutierrez. The play won the Tony Award for Best Revival of a Play, with Jones, Sternhagen and director Gerald Gutierrez winning Tonys as well.

The 2012 production began previews in October 2012 at the Walter Kerr Theatre for a limited engagement, with direction by Moisés Kaufman and starring Jessica Chastain, David Strathairn, Dan Stevens, Judith Ivey, and Anneliese van der Pol .

== Plot ==
In New York City, sometime in the 1850s, Catherine Sloper is a plain, painfully shy woman whose father, Dr. Austin Sloper, makes no secret of his disappointment in her. Catherine, as her father painfully reminds her, has limited talent and cannot "hold a candle" to her deceased mother. Catherine's gregarious Aunt Lavinia Penniman moves into the household after becoming widowed and attempts to prod Catherine into being more social and finding a husband.

When she meets the handsome Morris Townsend at a ball, Catherine is taken by the attention he lavishes upon her. Catherine falls madly in love with Morris and they plan to marry. Dr. Sloper believes Morris, being far more attractive and charming than Catherine, but poor and with few prospects after he wasted his own inheritance, is courting Catherine only to get her sizable income. Aunt Lavinia favors the match regardless, being both romantic and pragmatic enough to view this as Catherine's chance at a happy married life. Morris is genuinely fond of Catherine's honesty and kindness despite his largely monetary motivations, and treats her with respect, unlike her father.

A frank discussion with Morris's sister confirms Dr. Sloper's opinion of Morris as a gold digger. The doctor takes his daughter to Europe for an extended time to separate them. When they return to New York, Dr. Sloper threatens to disinherit his daughter if she marries Morris and they have a bitter argument in which Catherine realizes how poorly he views her.

Catherine and Morris make plans to elope with the help of Aunt Lavinia. Catherine packs her bags and waits all night for Morris to come and take her away, but he never does. Catherine is heartbroken and grows cold.

Soon afterward, Dr. Sloper reveals he is dying. He tells Catherine that he is proud she resisted Morris, but Catherine tells her father she still loves Morris and dares him to change his will if he is afraid they will waste his money after he dies. He does not alter the will and dies, leaving her his entire estate. Catherine refuses to see him on his deathbed.

A few years later, Morris returns from California having made nothing of himself and having even fewer prospects. Aunt Lavinia arranges for Morris to visit Catherine, thinking this is Catherine's last chance. Catherine gives Morris a gift of ruby buttons that she had bought for him in Paris. Morris eagerly promises to come back for her that night and she tells him she will start packing her bags. After Morris leaves, Catherine informs her aunt that she has no intention of offering her love to him. Her aunt asks her if she can be so cruel, and Catherine coldly responds "Yes, I can be very cruel. I have been taught by masters." When Morris arrives later that night with the promised carriage, he rings the bell, and Catherine orders the maid to bolt the door, leaving Morris locked outside, shouting her name and banging on the door.

=== Characters ===
- Catherine Sloper
- Dr Austin Sloper
- Morris Townsend
- Lavinia Penniman, Catherine's widowed aunt
- Maria, the Slopers' maid
- Mrs Montgomery, Morris Townsend's widowed sister
- Marian Almond, Catherine's cousin
- Elizabeth Almond, Catherine's aunt
- Arthur Townsend, Marian's fiancé and Morris' distant cousin

== Awards and nominations ==
Original 1947

- Tony Award for Best Actor in a Play – Basil Rathbone (winner)
- Tony Award for Best Costume Design – Mary Percy Schenck (winner)

1976 revival

- Drama Desk Award for Outstanding Actor in a Play – Richard Kiley (nominee)
- Drama Desk Award for Outstanding Featured Actress in a Play – Toni Darnay (nominee)

1995 revival

- Drama Desk Award for Outstanding Revival of a Play (winner)
- Tony Award for Best Revival of a Play (winner)
- Tony Award for Best Direction of a Play – Gerald Gutierrez (winner)
- Tony Award for Best Actress in a Play – Cherry Jones (winner)
- Tony Award for Best Featured Actress in a Play – Frances Sternhagen (winner)

2012 revival

- Tony Award for Best Featured Actress in a Play – Judith Ivey (nominee)
