= Stephen Porter (director) =

American stage and television director, producer, set designer and writer

Stephen Winthrop Porter (July 24, 1925 – June 11, 2013) was an American stage and television director, producer, set designer and writer best known for directing the classics, especially George Bernard Shaw, Molière and Shakespeare. Porter directed more than thirty Broadway plays and many regional, Off-Broadway and other productions over his long career. He was nominated for two Tony Awards and two Drama Desk Awards for his work as a director.

== Biography ==
Stephen Porter was born in Ogdensburg, New York to Charles Talbot and Anna Martin. His father was an engineer and his mother a school teacher. Porter studied at Yale University. He died in New York City, his longtime home, on June 11, 2013.

=== Career ===
Porter began his career as a teacher, director and designer for McGill University in Montreal, Quebec, Canada. He worked at the university from 1952 to 1955 and while there directed productions of Measure for Measure, Les Caprices de Marianne, The Cenci, The Seagull and Much Ado About Nothing. He then directed at various theatres in Canada. In 1956, Porter moved to New York City to direct and produce The Misanthrope at the Off-Broadway Theatre East. Porter remained in New York for the next three years directing and/or producing several Broadway and off-Broadway plays, including productions of The Country Wife, Mister Roberts, Cat on a Hot Tin Roof, The Matchmaker, Inherit the Wind, Auntie Mame and Room at the Top. In 1959, Porter moved to Milwaukee, Wisconsin to work for the Fred Miller Theatre where he directed two plays: the Dark of the Moon and Our Town.

In 1960, Porter became the Director for the Association of Producing Artists (APA) at the McCarter Theatre in Princeton, New Jersey. During his two-year tenure there, he directed such plays as Right You Are by Luigi Pirandello, Scapin, King Lear, Twelfth Night, The Alchemist, Antigone, Caligula, Galileo and Julius Caesar. In 1962, Porter became the Artistic Director for the Playhouse in the Park in Cincinnati, Ohio. He held that position for three years, directing many plays, including The Lady's Not for Burning, The Hostage, The Devil's Disciple, The Burnt Flower Bed by Ugo Betti, The Doctor in Spite of Himself, Major Barbara and Sodom and Gomorrah among others. During this time, Porter also directed several plays in New York City, including Scapin for the Phoenix Theatre company in 1963; three different productions of Right You Are in 1963, 1964 and 1966; Impromptu at Versailles for Phoenix Theatre in 1964; The Hostage and Man and Superman (written by Porter) in 1964; three successful Broadway revivals in a row: The Wild Duck (1965), The Show-Off (1967) and The Misanthrope (1968); Krapp's Last Tape; King Lear; Twelfth Night; another Broadway revival, Private Lives, in 1969, and Harvey (1970).

In 1971, Porter became the artistic director of the New Phoenix Repertory Company in New York City. Porter remained in that position for five years, and while there directed and produced several productions including: The School for Wives (1971), Dom Juan, The Visit (1973), Chemin de fer (1974), Rules of the Game and They Knew What They Wanted. After this, he directed for Circle in the Square, including their successful 1977 revival of The Importance of Being Earnest. During this decade, Porter received considerable acclaim, receiving nominations for Tony Awards for Best Director of a Play for his work on The School for Wives (1971) and Chemin de Fer (1974), as well as nominations for Drama Desk Awards for Outstanding Director of a Play for his work on They Knew What They Wanted (1976) and Man and Superman (1979).

Since then, Porter has directed more than fifty more plays either on or off Broadway or at Regional theaters throughout the United States and Canada. More recent credits include the Broadway productions of The Devil's Disciple (1988) and The Miser (1990) and Getting Married (1991). Porter has also directed a few Television productions, most notably PBS' 1974 production of A Touch of the Poet.
