= Gerald Gutierrez =

American theatre director (1950–2003)

- Born: March 2, 1950; Brooklyn, New York, U.S.
- Died: December 29, 2003 (aged 53); Brooklyn, New York, U.S.
- Education: Midwood High School; Juilliard School
- Occupation: Stage director

Gerald Gutierrez (February 3, 1950 – December 29, 2003) was an American Tony Award-winning stage director. He was born and died in Brooklyn, New York.

== Career ==
Gutierrez was a graduate of Midwood High School in Brooklyn, New York, and then the Juilliard School and initially worked as a performer. He then started directing Off-Broadway, often at Playwrights Horizons. He directed, among others, the following plays at Lincoln Center: The Most Happy Fella (1992), The Heiress (1995), A Delicate Balance (1996), and Dinner at Eight (2002). His work with The Heiress and A Delicate Balance was said to be (by Playbill) as "near perfect representations of those plays".

Of The Heiress, the Variety reviewer wrote: "Although Gerald Gutierrez’s direction can’t be undervalued, The Heiress is not by any stretch “director’s theater.”... Under Gutierrez's sure hand, the exceptional cast never falters." He directed the Wendy Wasserstein play Isn't It Romantic in 1983. Gutierrez and Wasserstein were good friends.

He was said (by The New York Times) to have "an obsession with detail that made each production tick like a perfectly calibrated clock", and to do "ferocious" research. André Bishop, a close friend of Gutierrez, said: "Of all the directors I know, he was one who combined a scrupulous sense of reality with enormous flair and style."

== Death ==
Gutierrez died in his sleep of respiratory failure, on December 29, 2003, aged 53.

== Awards and nominations ==
Gutierrez was nominated for the 1994 Tony Award, Director of a Play for Abe Lincoln in Illinois. He won the 1995 Tony Award, Director of a Play for The Heiress and the 1996 Tony Award, Director of a Play for A Delicate Balance.
