= The Lyric Stage Company of Boston =

Theatre company

- Address: 140 Clarendon Street; Boston, Massachusetts; United States
- Capacity: 244
- Type: Non-profit

Construction
- Opened: 1974; 52 years ago

Website
- www.lyricstage.com

The Lyric Stage Company of Boston is Boston's oldest professional theatre company. Founded in 1974, the non-profit theatre is in the YWCA building at 140 Clarendon Street. It produces six plays and musicals each season and is known for its Stephen Sondheim musical productions.

== History ==
=== Location ===
Ron Ritchell and Polly Hogan founded the Lyric Stage Company of Boston in 1974, with performances staged in the Community Church on Boylston Street. In 1976, the Lyric Stage moved to a theatre at 56 Charles Street. The stage was small, less than 300 square feet, and it sat 103. In 1991, the Lyric Stage moved to its current location in the YWCA Building at 140 Clarendon Street. The theatre has a large stage, a band loft, and seats 234.

=== Notable Productions ===
The Lyric Stage produced Antigone and The Second Man in its first season.

Its first production at 54 Charles Street was The Importance of Being Earnest.

The first production at 140 Clarendon was Red Hot & Cole.

The Lyric Stage's production of Whoop-Dee-Doo! In the 1995–1996 season, earned its first Elliot Norton Award for Outstanding Designer.

The theatre's first large-scale musical production was Sunday in the Park with George, which was staged during the 2001–2002 season.

The 2022 production of The Play That Goes Wrong is the highest grossing run in Lyric Stage history.

== Community involvement ==
In fulfilling its mission to support the Boston theatre scene, the Lyric Stage casts and hires local playwrights, actors, directors, designers, and musicians. Since its founding, the Lyric Stage has employed over 800 actors and 160 designers.

=== Lyric For All ===
Lyric Stage presents live theatre that promotes inclusivity and connection in an effort to integrate live theater into the lives of all Greater Boston residents. Affordable options are available, making theatre truly for all.

=== Lyric Back Stage ===
An education program that provides an introduction to the jobs and potential back stage career paths in the performing arts such as lighting, sound, props, and costuming.

=== Lyric First Page ===
Lyric First Page was created in 2020 to provide playwriting opportunities and resources to Boston Public School students and interested students from the surrounding communities. The festival of readings features work that reflects students’ experiences, ranging from everyday activities to dreams and even outer space. Lyric First Page's mission is to provide an outlet for students and connect them with their own potential to be theater makers. A volunteer panel of theater professionals and teachers evaluate submissions on character, dialogue, plot, content, and impact. All playwrights receive feedback and may be included in a future reading series highlighting the talents of Boston-based students.

== Past productions ==
Season	Show 1	Show 2	Show 3	Show 4	Show 5	Show 6	Show 7	Show 8	Show 9
1974–1975	Antigone	The Second Man							
1975–1976	Oedipus Rex	Ghosts							
1976–1977	The Importance of Being Earnest	The Glass Menagerie	A Child's Christmas in Wales	The Lady's Not for Burning	The Homecoming	The Master Builder			
1977–1978	Mrs. Warren's Profession	A Child's Christmas in Wales	Hedda Gabler	The Little Foxes	Another Part of the Forest	The Caretaker			
1978–1979	The Autumn Garden	A Child's Christmas in Wales	A Moon for the Misbegotten	Playboy of the Western World	Old Times	The Philanderer	Relatively Speaking		
1979–1980	Much Ado about Nothing	The Show-Off	A Child's Christmas in Wales	A Touch of Poet	You Never Can Tell	Antigone	Ghosts		
1980–1981	Hedda Gabler	The Glass Menagerie	A Child's Christmas in Wales	Juno and the Paycock	Arms and the Man	The Price	The Norman Conquests	The Importance of Being Earnest	
1981–1982	All My Sons	The Norman Conquests	A Child's Christmas in Wales	The Master Builder	The Little Foxes	Misalliance	The Plough and the Stars		
1982–1983	Twain's Folly	Private Lives	A Child's Christmas in Wales	The Diary of Anne Frank	A Moon for the Misbegotten	Streamers	Mrs. Warren's Profession	You Can't Take It with You	The True Irving Rifkin
1983–1984	Goodly Creatures Loot	A Child's Christmas in Wales	Blithe Spirit	Awake and Sing	Taking Steps	You Never Can Tell	Loot		
1984–1985	Handy Dandy	Another Part of the Forest	A Child's Christmas in Wales	A View from the Bridge	French Without Tears	Playboy of the Western World			
1985–1986	Widowers’ Houses	Juno and the Paycock	A Child's Christmas in Wales	Painting Churches	Harvey	Absurd Person Singular	Cat on a Hot Tin Roof		
1986–1987	And a Nightingale Sang	The Norman Conquests	A Child's Christmas in Wales	The Hasty Heart	A Streetcar Named Desire	Candida	Quartermaine's Terms		
1987–1988	The Price	Hay Fever	How the Other Half Loves	A Child's Christmas in Wales	The Bishop's Bonfire	What the Butler Saw	The Common Pursuit		
1988–1989	What the Butler Saw	The Big Knife	A Child's Christmas in Wales	Arms and the Man	Present Laughter	The Caretaker	Not About Heroes		
1989–1990	Bedroom Farce	The Autumn Garden	A Child's Christmas in Wales	The Vortex	Otherwise Engaged	A Shayna Maidel			
1990–1991	Misalliance	Woman in Mind	A Child's Christmas in Wales	The Diary of Anne Frank	Butley	Drinking in America	A Thurber Reunion	Fallen Angels	
1991–1992	Red Hot and Cole	A Christmas Carol	Ghosts	You Never Can Tell	"Master Harold"...and the Boys	Our Country's Good	The Man Who Came to Dinner		
1992–1993	The Liar	Widowers’ Houses	A Child's Christmas in Wales	American Buffalo	The Mystery of Irma Vep	Rodgers & Hart: A Celebration	The Price	Tales of Sholem Aleichman	
1993–1994	From Boston to Portland: The Fred Allen Story	The Night Larry Kramer Kissed Me	A Child's Christmas in Wales	The Substance of Fire	A Woman of No Importance	My Astonishing Self	Pump Boys and Dinettes		
1994–1995	The Philanderer	Good Evening	A Child's Christmas in Wales	An Ideal Husband	Mrs. Warren's Profession	Time of My Life	Private Lives		
1995–1996	Whoop-Dee-Doo!	Hay Fever	Lady Windermere's Fan	A Child's Christmas in Wales	Oedipus Rex	Not About Heroes			
1996–1997	Entertaining Mr. Sloane	Candida	A Child's Christmas in Wales	Blithe Spirit	Speed-the-Plow	How the Other Half Loves	Juno and the Paycock		
1997–1998	Antigone	Pygmalion	A Child's Christmas in Wales	Laughter on the 23rd Floor	Present Laughter	The Heiress	Lost in Yonkers		
1998–1999	What the Butler Saw	Assassins	A Christmas Carol & The Night Before Christmas	The Miser	The Baltimore Waltz	Never the Sinner: The Leopold and Loeb Story	When Pigs Fly		
1999–2000	Morning's at Seven	The Old Settler	She Loves Me	The Comedy of Errors	Communicating Doors	The Judas Kiss	The World Goes ‘Round		
2000–2001	Side Man	A…My Name Will Always Be Alice	Inspecting Carol	The Complete History of America (Abridged)	No Way to Treat a Lady	Over the River and Through the Woods	The Curse of the Bambino		
2001–2002	Sunday in the Park with George	Lobby Hero	Nuncrackers: The Nunsense Christmas Musical	The Miracle Worker	The Lisbon Traviata	Glengarry Glen Ross	Lend Me a Tenor		
2002–2003	Dirty Blonde	The Gig	Epic Proportions	Beyond Belief	It's All True	2 Lives	Side Show		
2003–2004	When Pigs Fly	Book of Days	Meshuggah-Nuns!	Private Lives	The Spitfire Grill	The Mercy Seat	Noises Off		
2004–2005	A Little Night Music	Ears on a Beatle	Fully Committed	The Glass Menagerie	Red Herring	Living Out	Shakespeare in Hollywood		
2005–2006	Urinetown: The Musical	A Number	Crowns	The Underpants	The Goat, or Who Is Sylvia?	Talley's Folly	Kong's Night Out		
2006–2007	1776	Nine Parts of Desire	See What I Wanna See	Souvenir	Miss Witherspoon	Arms and The Man			
2007–2008	Man of La Mancha	Dying City	This Wonderful Life	Adrift in Macao	The Scene	Three Tall Women	The Importance of Being Earnest		
2008–2009	Follies	November	The Mystery of Irma Vep	The Year of Magical Thinking	Cat on a Hot Tin Roof	Speech and Debate	Grey Gardens		
2009–2010	Kiss Me, Kate	Dead Man's Cell Phone	Shipwrecked! An Entertainment	Groundswell	Legacy of Light	Lady Day at Emerson's Bar and Grill	Blithe Spirit		
2010–2011	The 25th Annual Putnam County Spelling Bee	The Life and Adventures of Nicholas Nickleby	The Understudy	My Name Is Asher Lev	Broke-ology	Animal Crackers			
2011–2012	Big River	Or,	Ain't Misbehavin’	Superior Donuts	Time Stands Still	The Temperamentals	Avenue Q		
2012–2013	The Mikado	The Chosen	Chinglish	33 Variations	Stones in His Pockets	By the Way, Meet Vera Stark	On the Town		
2013–2014	One Man, Two Guvnors	Water by the Spoonful	Becky's New Car	Working	Death of a Salesman	Rich Girl	Into the Woods		
2014–2015	Sweeney Todd	Dear Elizabeth	The Tale of the Allergist's Wife	Red Hot Patriot	Intimate Apparel	City of Angels	Light Up the Sky		
2015–2016	My Fair Lady	Saturday Night/Sunday Morning	Buyer & Cellar	Sondheim on Sondheim	Fast Company	Mr. Burns, a post-electric play	Peter and the Starcatcher		
2016–2017	Company	Warrior Class	Murder for Two	Who's Afraid of Virginia Woolf?	Stage Kiss	Barbecue	Camelot		
2017–2018	Gypsy	Souvenir	Hold These Truths	Road Show	Virginia Woolf's Orlando	Anna Christie	The Wiz		
2018–2019	Kiss of the Spider Woman	The Roommate	Breath & Imagination	The Wolves	The Little Foxes	Twelfth Night	Pacific Overtures		
2019–2020	Little Shop of Horrors	The Thanksgiving Play	Agatha Christie's Murder on the Orient Express	The Cake	The Treasurer	No production due to the COVID-19 pandemic	No production due to the COVID-19 pandemic		
2020-2021	No production due to the COVID-19 pandemic	No production due to the COVID-19 pandemic	No production due to the COVID-19 pandemic	No production due to the COVID-19 pandemic	No production due to the COVID-19 pandemic	No production due to the COVID-19 pandemic			
2021-2022	Be Here Now	The Last 5 Years	Mr. Parent	The Book of Will	A Gentleman's Guide to Love and Murder	The Light			
2022-2023	Fabulation or, The Re-Education of Undine	The Play That Goes Wrong	Preludes	The Great Leap	Sister Act	Rooted			
2023-2024	Assassins	Ken Ludwig's The Game's Afoot: Holmes for the Holidays	Trouble in Mind	Thirst	The Drowsy Chaperone	Yellow Face			
2024-2025	Urinetown	Noises Off	Crumbs From The Table of Joy	ART	The Great Reveal	Hello Dolly!			
2025-2026	Our Town	A Sherlock Carol	Penelope	Angry, Raucous, and Shamelessly Gorgeous	Something Rotten!				

Ref
