= Cherry Lane Theatre =

Off-Broadway theater in Manhattan, New York

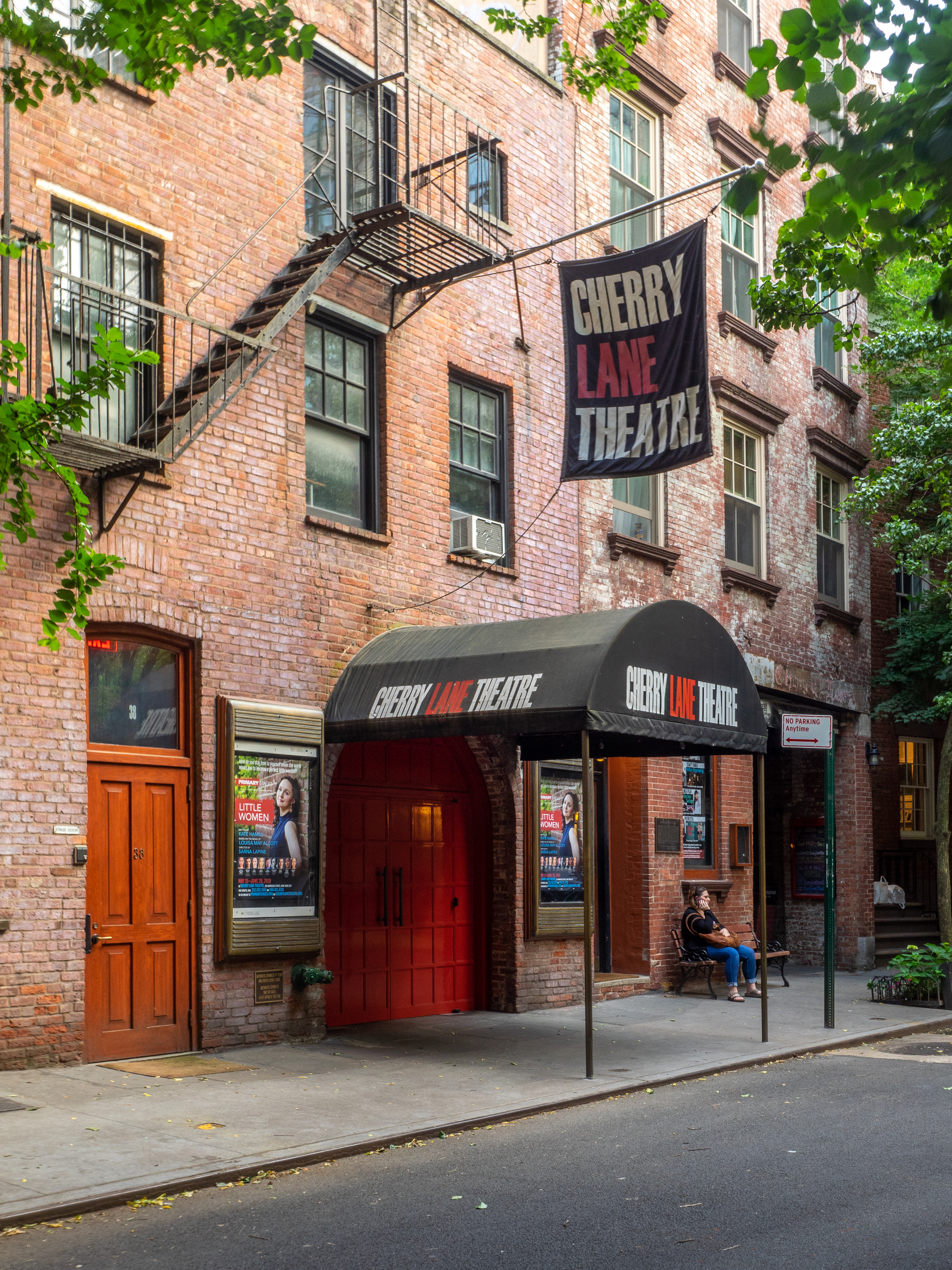
- 2019
- Interactive map of Cherry Lane Theatre
- Address: 38 Commerce Street; Manhattan, New York City; United States
- Coordinates: 40.731317°N 74.005337°W
- Owner: A24, Taurus Investment Holdings
- Operator: Cherry Lane Theatre Company, Managing Director, Mary Geerlof
- Capacity: 167 main stage, 60 studio

Construction
- Opened: December 1923
- Renovated: 2025
- Architect: Cleon Throckmorton (conversion)

Website
- cherrylanetheatre.org

The Cherry Lane Theatre is the oldest continuously running off-Broadway theater in New York City. The theater is located at 38 Commerce Street between Barrow and Bedford Streets in the West Village neighborhood of Greenwich Village, Manhattan, New York City. The Cherry Lane Theatre contains a 167-seat main stage and a 60-seat studio.

== History ==
=== Origins and conversion ===
The building was constructed as a farm silo in 1817, and also served as a brewery, tobacco warehouse, and box factory before Evelyn Vaughn, William S. Rainey, Reginald Travers & Edna St. Vincent Millay converted the structure into a theater they christened the Cherry Lane Playhouse. It opened in 1923. Its first reviewed show was Saturday Night by Robert Presnell, which opened on February 9, 1924. This was followed by the plays The Man Who Ate Popomack, by W. J. Turner, directed by Reginald Travers, on March 24, 1924; and The Way of the World by William Congreve, produced by the Cherry Lane Players Inc., opening November 17, 1924. The theatre received a significant makeover in 1954 when it acquired much of the expensive furnishings sold off by Rockefeller Center's failing Center Theatre.

=== Experimental theater hub ===
The Cherry Lane Theatre has long been a home for nontraditional and experimental works. Particularly during the 1950s and '60s, it hosted many avant garde performances that were identified with the counterculture. It regularly staged works by playwrights associated with the Theatre of the Absurd. The modernist stage company The Living Theatre was in residence in 1951 and 1952, performing rarities like Pablo Picasso's Desire Caught by the Tail. Occasionally, the theatre hosted musical performances, providing a venue for Bob Dylan and Pete Seeger long before their ascensions to fame.

A succession of major American plays was produced at the theater by writers including F. Scott Fitzgerald, John Dos Passos, and Elmer Rice in the 1920s; Eugene O'Neill, Seán O'Casey, Clifford Odets, W. H. Auden, Gertrude Stein, Luigi Pirandello, and William Saroyan in the 1940s; Samuel Beckett, Pablo Picasso, T. S. Eliot, Jean Anouilh, and Tennessee Williams in the 1950s; Harold Pinter, LeRoi Jones, Eugène Ionesco, Terrence McNally, Lanford Wilson, and Lorraine Hansberry, in the 1960s, as well as Edward Albee, staging a large number of his plays; and Sam Shepard, Joe Orton and David Mamet in the 1970s and 1980s.

Beckett's Happy Days had its world premiere at the Cherry Lane, directed by Alan Schneider, on September 17, 1961, and the American premiere of his Endgame opened on January 28, 1958, also directed by Schneider, starring Alvin Epstein and Lester Rawlins.

Sam Shepard's True West premiered at the Cherry Lane on October 17, 1982, starring John Malkovich and Gary Sinise.

=== Fiordellisi ownership ===
Angelina Fiordellisi bought the theater and the building in 1996 for $1.7 million and renovated it for $3 million. That year, artistic director Fiordellisi and Susann Brinkley co-founded the Cherry Lane Theatre Company, and the Cherry Lane Alternative followed in 1997.

In 1998, Fiordellisi, Brinkley, and playwright Michael Weller co-founded the company's Mentor Project, which matches established dramatists with aspiring playwrights in one-to-one mentoring relationships. Each mentor works with a playwright to perfect a single work during the season-long process, which culminates in a production. Participants have included Pulitzer Prize-winners David Auburn, Charles Fuller, Tony Kushner, Marsha Norman, Alfred Uhry, Jules Feiffer, and Wendy Wasserstein; Pulitzer nominees A.R. Gurney, David Henry Hwang, Craig Lucas, and Theresa Rebeck; and Obie Award winners Ed Bullins and Lynn Nottage, as mentors. From the outset, Edward Albee participated as the Mentor's Mentor by attending Project readings and performances and conducting a yearly Master Class.

=== Financial crisis and transition ===
In July 2010, the theater announced a one-year hiatus in an effort to tackle mounting debt. In August 2011, Angelina Fiordellisi announced that Cherry Lane Theatre had been able to work off almost all of its debt, and planned to produce again in 2012. Fiordellisi had received hundreds of phone calls, emails, and visits from people who were concerned to hear that she was leaving and that the theatre was for sale, and when those people started referring rentals to Cherry Lane, she was able to look ahead and feel more secure about the theatre's financial future. Cherry Lane Theatre began producing new works again with its Obie Award–winning Mentor Project in February 2012.

In July 2021, it was announced that the theatre had been sold to the Lucille Lortel Foundation, and Fiordellisi would remain involved with the Cherry Lane Alternative. However, the sale to the Lortel Foundation fell through due to disputes over the price. In November 2021, the theater was placed back on the market for nearly $13 million.

=== A24 ownership ===
In March 2023, a partnership between film studio A24 and global private equity real estate firm Taurus Investment Holdings, LLC purchased the theatre from Fiordellisi for a little over $10 million, marking an expansion for A24 beyond film and television into theatre. A24 indicated that it would retain the Cherry Lane as a live-theatre venue. Following a $2.3 million renovation, A24 announced in mid-2025 that the Cherry Lane Theatre would reopen that September. The modifications included upgrades to equipment, seating, and the lobby. A24 also built a restaurant called Wild Cherry, hiring Frenchette's operators to operate the restaurant. The theatre reopened on September 8, 2025, with the first of a series of one night only events, followed by a run of Natalie Palamides's Weer which began on September 20. Following the renovation, the Cherry Lane had 167 seats.

== Productions ==
Productions staged at the Cherry Lane include The Rimers of Eldritch, Claudia Shear's Blown Sideways Through Life, Fortune's Fool with Alan Bates and Frank Langella, The Sum of Us with Tony Goldwyn, the Richard Maltby Jr./David Shire musical Closer Than Ever, Sam Shepard's True West, Joe Orton's Entertaining Mr. Sloane, Edward Albee's The Zoo Story, John-Michael Tebelak and Stephen Schwartz's Godspell, Paul Osborn's Morning's at Seven, Laura Pedersen's The Brightness of Heaven (later changed to For Heaven's Sake!), the long-running Nunsense, and David Rimmer's Album, a Pulitzer Prize finalist.

Also presented was a 25th-anniversary revival of Nunsense, running June 15 to July 18, 2010.

=== Under A24 ===
Year	Title	Playwright	Notable Cast
2025	Weer	Natalie Palamides	Natalie Palamides
2026	You Got Older	Clare Barron	Alia Shawkat and Peter Friedman
2026	Shifters	Benedict Lombe	Heather Agyepong and Daniel Ezra
