= Daniel Breaker =

American actor and comedian

- Born: June 2, 1980 (age 46); Manhattan, Kansas, U.S.
- Education: Juilliard School (BFA)
- Occupations: Actor; comedian
- Years active: 2002–present
- Spouse: Kate Whoriskey (m. 2008)
- Children: 2

Daniel Breaker (born June 2, 1980) is an American actor and comedian. He is best known for playing Donkey in the original cast of Shrek the Musical. His other Broadway credits include principal roles in Hamilton, Hadestown, Once Upon a Mattress, and The Book of Mormon.

== Career ==
Beginning his career in 2002, immediately after graduating from Juilliard, Breaker has performed in Off-Broadway, London, and U.S. regional theatre productions. He performed in five plays at the Shakespeare Theatre in Washington D.C. His first major role was the Youth, protagonist of the Off-Broadway premiere of Passing Strange, for which he won an Obie Award in 2008. He was then nominated for a Tony Award for the show's Broadway transfer, in which he again played the Youth; he also played this role in Spike Lee's filmed version of the musical.

One of his most recognizable roles was Donkey in the original Broadway production of Shrek the Musical, which ran from November 2008 through January 2010. He starred alongside long-time Broadway stars Brian d'Arcy James, Sutton Foster, John Tartaglia, and Christopher Sieber. For his portrayal, Breaker earned a Drama Desk Award nomination for Outstanding Actor in a Musical. His voice can be heard on the original cast recording of the show.

He has also appeared in the plays Well and Cymbeline. In 2009, he co-hosted the Obie Awards.

Breaker previously played Mafala Hatimbi in The Book of Mormon on Broadway. He also appeared as the King of Navarre in The Public Theater's Shakespeare in the Park production of the Love's Labour's Lost musical. He played Aaron Burr in Hamilton in Chicago and joined the musical's Broadway cast.

Breaker has also been a guest star on TV. Since 2021, he has been part of the supporting cast of the Peacock show Girls5Eva. Breaker starred as the Jester alongside his former Shrek the Musical co-star Sutton Foster in the 2024 Broadway revival of Once Upon a Mattress. On January 9, 2025, it was announced that Breaker would take over the role of Hermes in the Broadway production of Hadestown starting February 18, and on December 26, 2025, it was announced that he would take over the same role in the London production at the Lyric Theatre.

== Personal life ==
Breaker has been married to theatre director Kate Whoriskey since 2008. They have two children.

== Stage credits ==
Year	Title	Role	Theater	Notes
2003	Pericles	Pericles	Red Bull Theater	
2004	Fabulation, or the Re-Education of Undine	Agent Duva/Flow/Dealer/Addict #2/Ensemble	Playwrights Horizons	Off-Broadway
2005	The Tempest	Ariel	Shakespeare Theatre Company	
2006	Well	Jim and others	Longacre Theatre	Broadway
2007	Passing Strange	Youth	The Public Theater	Off-Broadway
2007–2008	Cymbeline	Gentleman	Lincoln Center Theatre	Broadway
2008	Passing Strange	Youth	Belasco Theatre	Broadway
2008–2010	Shrek the Musical	Donkey	Broadway Theatre	Broadway
2011	By the Way, Meet Vera Stark	Leroy Barksdale/Herb Forrester	Second Stage Theater	Off-Broadway
2012	The Performers	Lee	Longacre Theatre	Broadway
2013	Love's Labour's Lost	King Ferdinand of Navarre	Delacorte Theater	
2014–2017	The Book of Mormon	Mafala Hatimbi	Eugene O'Neill Theatre	Broadway
2017	Hamilton	Aaron Burr	PrivateBank Theatre	
2017–2020	Hamilton	Aaron Burr	Richard Rodgers Theatre	Broadway
2024	Judgment Day	Father Michael	Chicago Shakespeare Theater	
2024	Once Upon a Mattress	The Jester	Hudson Theatre	Broadway
2024–2025	Once Upon a Mattress	The Jester	Ahmanson Theatre	Los Angeles
2025	Hadestown	Hermes	Walter Kerr Theatre	Broadway
2025–2026	Hadestown	Hermes	Lyric Theatre	West End

== Filmography ==
=== Film ===
Year	Title	Role	Notes
2011	Limitless	Campaign Manager	
2012	Red Hook Summer	Cliff	
2013	He's Way More Famous Than You	EMT	
2013	Shrek the Musical	Donkey	
2015	Sisters	Airport Bartender	

=== Television ===
Year	Title	Role	Notes
2002	Law & Order: Criminal Intent	Zach	Episode: "The Pilgrim"
2009	Great Performances	Youth	Episode: "Passing Strange"
2011	Unforgettable	Mark	Episode: "Lost Things"
2014	Submissions Only	Dean Klausen	5 episodes
2014–2016	Mozart in the Jungle	Virgil	16 episodes
2017–2018	Unbreakable Kimmy Schmidt	Agent Dunleavy	2 episodes
2020	Helpsters	Artist Andrew	Episode: "Camper Cortez/Artist Andrew & Detective Dudley"
2020–2023	Billions	Roger 'Scooter' Dunbar	34 episodes
2021–2024	Girls5eva	Scott	12 episodes
2022	The Good Fight	Randy Elkin	5 episodes
