= Kilgannon =

Kilgannon is a last name. Notable people with this last name include:

- Jim Kilgannon (1937–2000), Scottish association football player
- Sean Kilgannon (born 1981), Scottish association football player

== Fictional characters ==
- Kilgannon, several characters in The Amory Wars, a series of science fiction comic books and novels
- Kilgannon, several characters in For Heaven's Sake, an American off-Broadway play
