= Shifters (play) =

2024 play by Benedict Lombe

- 2026 Off-Broadway production poster
- Original language: English
- Written by: Benedict Lombe
- Characters: Des; Dre

Premiere
- Date: 23 February 2024
- Place: Bush Theatre

Shifters is a 2024 play by Congolese-British playwright Benedict Lombe which follows the complications of a love story of a young Black couple, Dre and Des, reconnecting after years apart. The production premiered at the Off-West End Bush Theatre in 2024, before transferring to the West End the same year at the Duke of York's Theatre. Shifters was the third ever play written by a Black British woman to be staged at the West End, after Nine Night by Natasha Gordon (Trafalgar Studios, 2018) and J'ouvert by Yasmin Joseph (Harold Pinter Theatre, 2021).

Shifters was premiered in the US Off-Broadway in July 2026 at the Cherry Lane Theatre.

== Plot ==
The play follows the years-long love story between Dre and Des (short for Destiny), who first met at high school in South London and brought together by the school's debating club. Des is British-Congolese and comes from a middle-class family (her father working as a neurologist) while Dre, who is British-Nigerian, comes from a less well off background, living with his grandmother while his estranged mother lives in Nigeria. Des goes on to become a conceptual artist based in America while Dre remains in England, working as a restauranteur. Over a decade later, the two protagonists reconnect at Dre's grandmother's funeral back in England, bringing up sparks of the past and thoughts of the future.

== Production history ==
=== 2024 Off-West End premiere ===
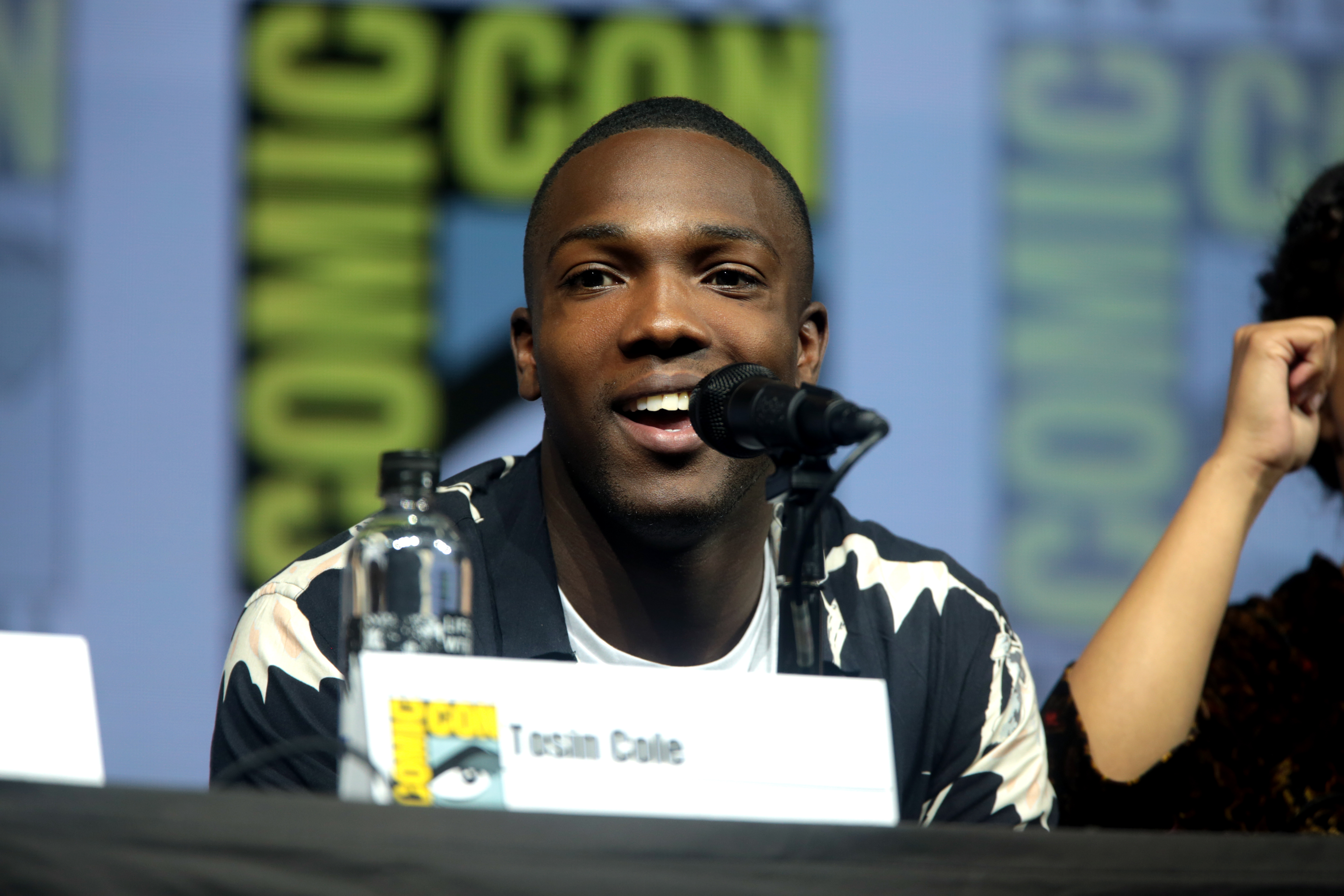
Tosin Cole portrayed Dre in the original production at Bush Theatre as well as in the West End transfer.

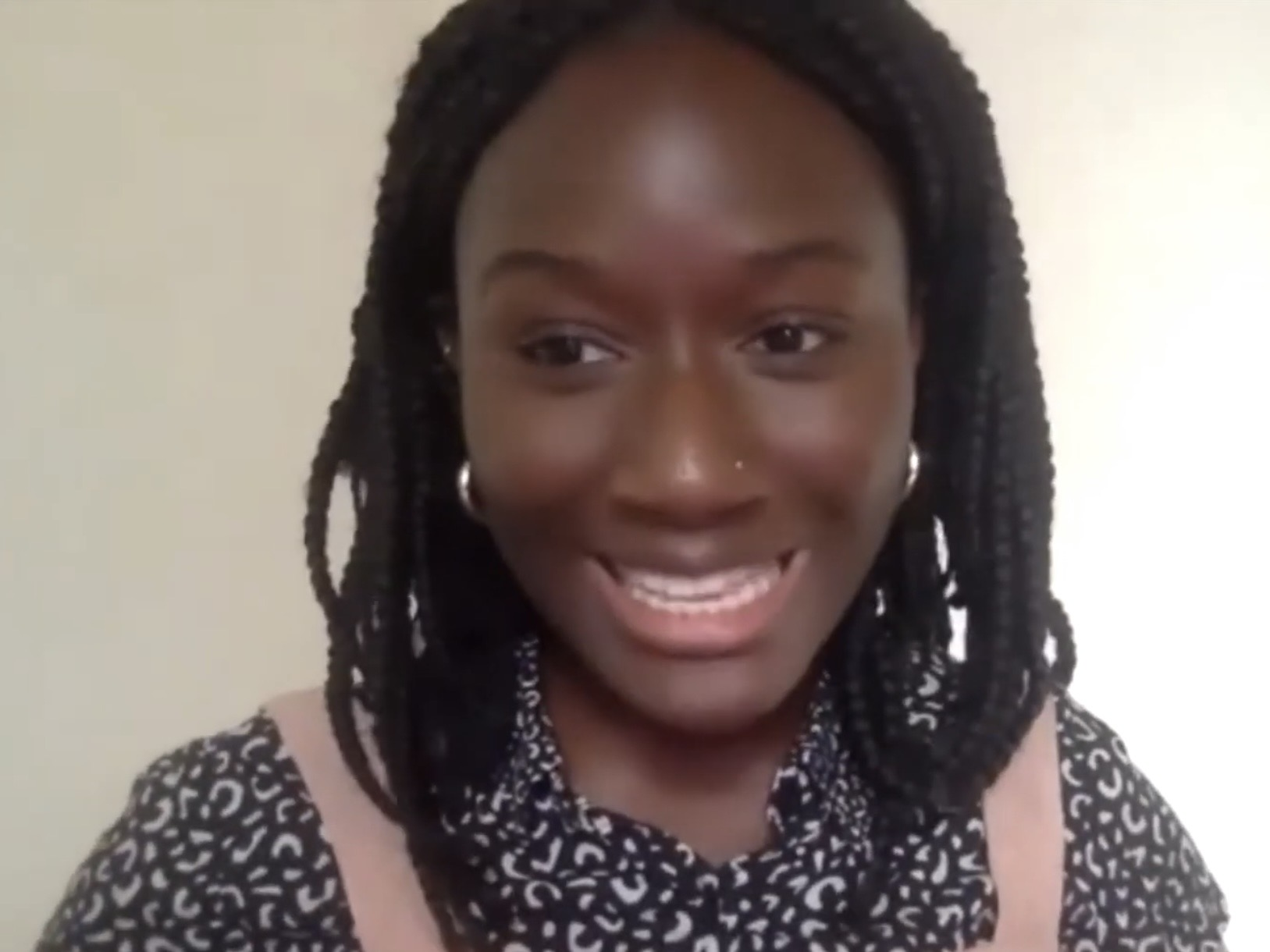
Heather Agyepong has portrayed Des in all three productions of Shifters in 2024 and 2026.

The play first premiered Off-West End at the Bush Theatre in London in 2024, running from 16 February to 30 March 2024. Directed by Lynette Linton, the production starred Heather Agyepong as Des and Tosin Cole as Dre. The Guardian praised the production, giving it four stars and lauding the show's "real heart, soul and the everyday tragedy of long-lost first loves." Similarly, London Theatre praised the cast's performances as "simply irresistible" and the play's "fluid, dreamlike structure."

=== 2024 West End transfer ===
Following positive reception, the production was announced to transfer to the West End at the Duke of York's Theatre, running from 12 August to 12 October 2024. This made Lombe the third ever Black British woman to have a play staged in the West End. According to the Guardian, the playwright herself was in disbelief about this statistics and called for "a reckoning for producers in the West End, for them to realise there are so many stories not being told in those spaces".

Both Agyepong and Cole reprised their role, with Linton also returning to direct. The play again received positive reviews, with Salterton Arts Review calling the show "witty, real, and memorable" and Forbes praised it as a "refreshing rollercoaster of a romance." The production was nominated for the 2025 Laurence Olivier Award for Best New Play and 2025 Laurence Olivier Award for Best Actress (Heather Agyepong). Lombe would be the first Black British woman to receive a nomination in this category.

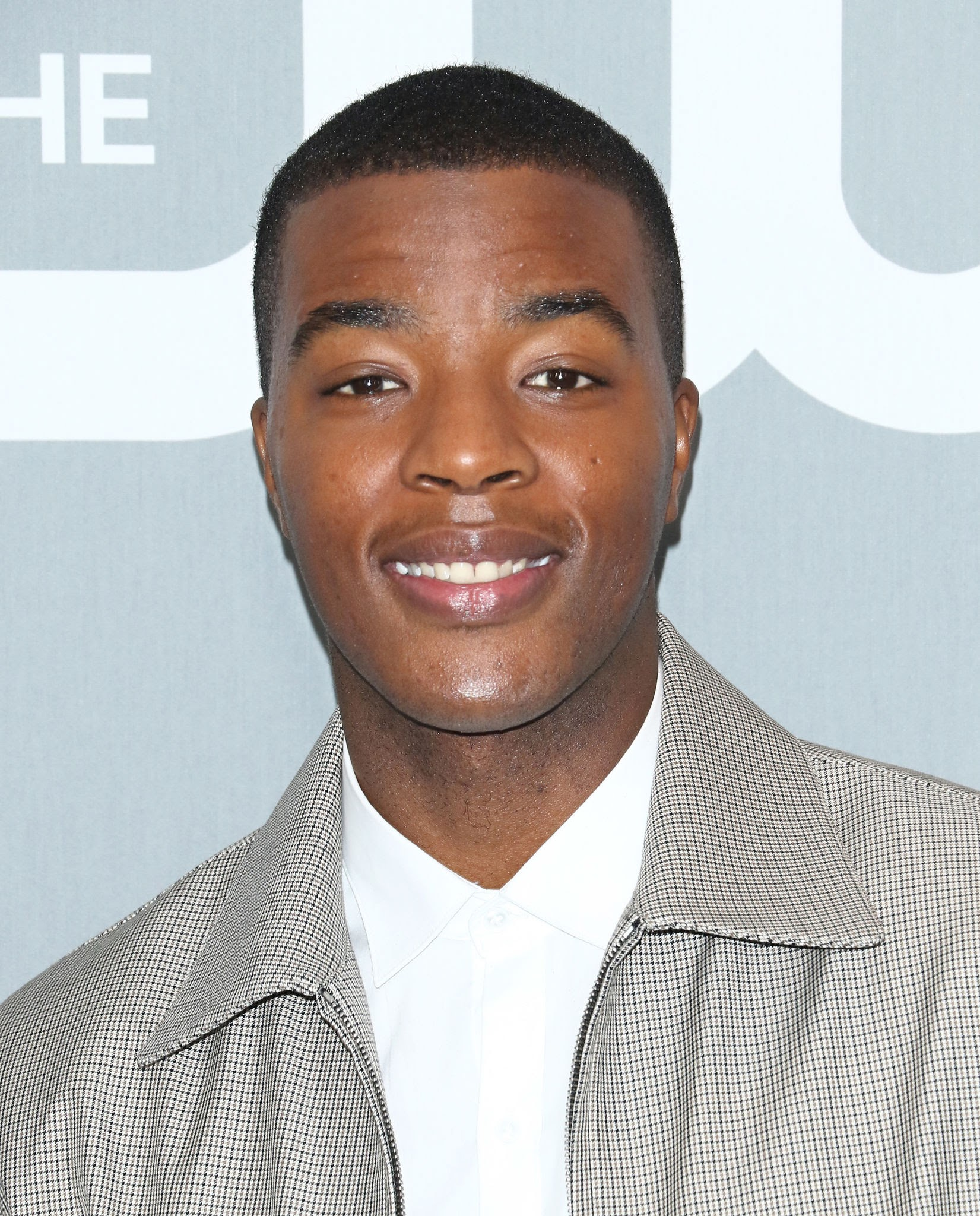
Daniel Ezra replaces Tosin Cole as Dre in the 2026 Off-Broadway production.

=== 2026 Off-Broadway production ===
The play is set to make its North American premiere Off-Broadway at the Cherry Lane Theatre in July 2026, directed by Linton and again starring Apyepong with Daniel Ezra taking over the role of Dre. Linton also returned to direct this production, which began on 15 July and is set to run until 30 August 2026. Starting on 17 August, Apyepong was succeeded by Charity Bedu-Addo with the production's run extended to 13 September 2026.

== Cast and characters ==
Character	Off-West End	West End	Off-Broadway	
Character	2024	2024	2026	2026 cont.
Des	Heather Agyepong	Heather Agyepong	Heather Agyepong	Charity Bedu-Addo
Dre	Tosin Cole	Tosin Cole	Daniel Ezra	Daniel Ezra

== Awards and nominations ==
=== 2024 West End production ===
Year	Award	Category	Nominee(s)	Result	Ref.
2025	Laurence Olivier Awards	Best New Play		Nominated	
2025	Laurence Olivier Awards	Laurence Olivier Award for Best Actress	Heather Agyepong	Nominated	
2025	Offie	Creation	Benedict Lombe	Won	
2025	The Stage Debut Awards	Best Creative West End Debut	Benedict Lombe	Nominated	
