= Heather Agyepong =

British photographer, visual artist and performer/actor

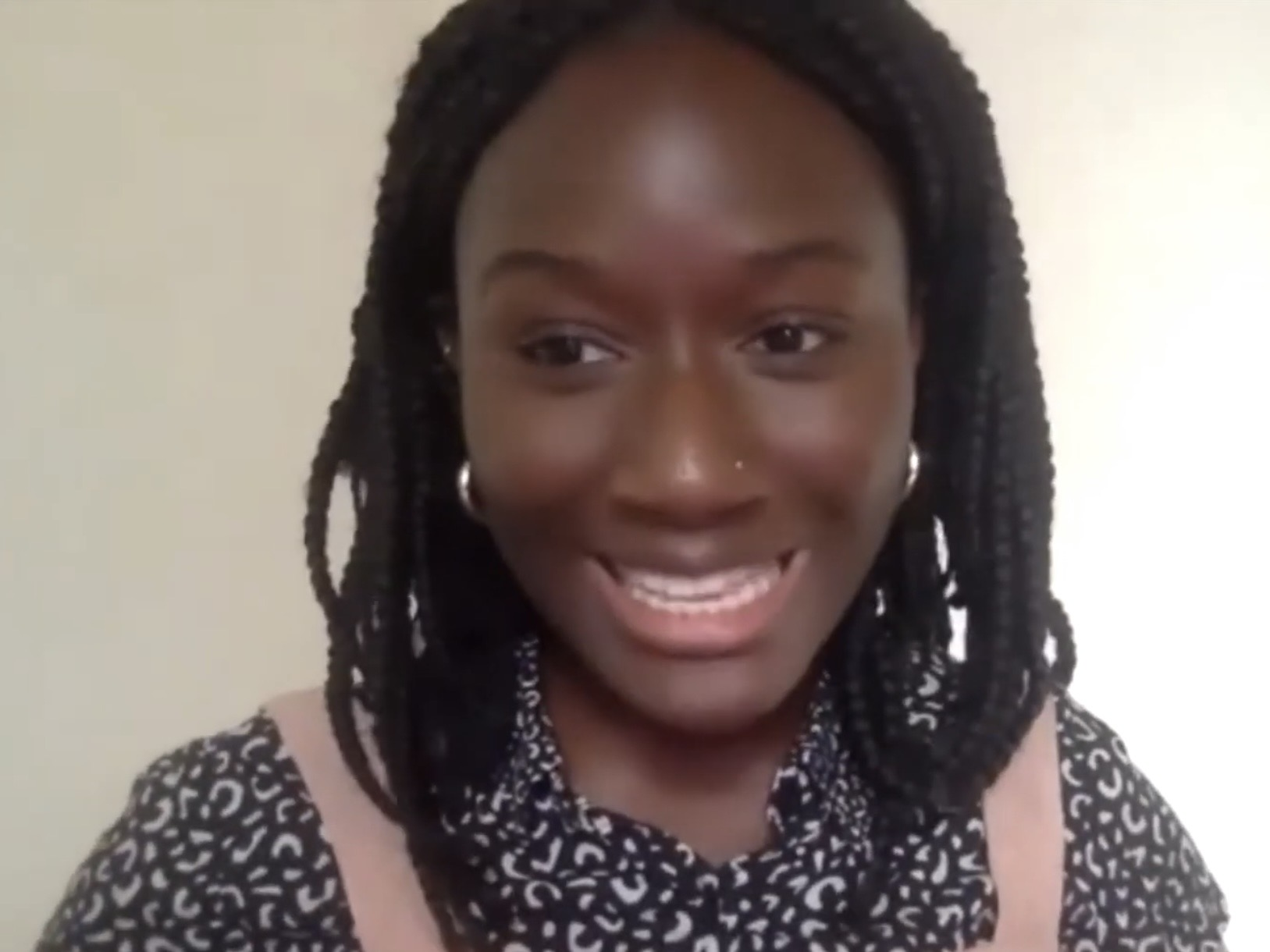
- Born: Heather Akosua Agyepong; 1990 (age 35–36); London
- Education: City of Westminster College; University of Kent; Goldsmiths, University of London
- Known for: Photography, visual art, acting
- Website: www.heatheragyepong.com

Heather Agyepong (born 1990) is a British-Ghanaian photographer, visual artist and actor, living in London.

== Early life and education ==
Agyepong was born and raised in London and is of Ghanaian heritage. Her mother moved to England from Ghana in her teenage years. She earned a National Diploma in Performing Arts from City of Westminster College; a BSc in Applied Psychology from the University of Kent; and an MA in Photography & Urban Cultures from Goldsmiths, University of London.

== Career ==
Agyepong is a multidisciplinary artist who has worked in photography, visual art, theatre, film, and television.

=== Photography ===
Agyepong's photography work has focused on mental health, activism and the African diaspora. It has been shown at the Tate Modern museum and the Centre for British Photography, and is part of the collections at the Mead Art Museum, the Autograph ABP, the Hyman Collection, the Centre National des Arts Plastiques, and the New Orleans Museum of Art.

In 2024, Nikon released a short film, The Mind in Focus, in which Agyepong describes how photography connects with her mental health.

She has been awarded the Photo London x Nikon Emerging Photographer Award and the Photographers' Gallery New Talent Award.

=== Visual arts ===
Wish You Were Here was a work commissioned by the Hyman Collection. In it, Agyepong channels the American vaudeville performer Aida Overton Walker, by posing for a series of fake postcards. The work addresses physical and mental wellbeing.

Another of Agyepong's works is The Body Remembers, a solo performance that "explores how trauma lives in the body, particularly for Black British women across different generations."

=== Theatre ===
Agyepong has performed in several plays. She received recognition for her 2024 performance in Shifters, written by Benedict Lombe and directed by Lynette Linton. For that performance, she was nominated for Best Actress at the 2025 Olivier Awards. In a review in The Independent, Alice Saville gave the play four out of five stars, saying, "Agyepong gives glimpses of vulnerability before building her walls up again, higher than before."

In her acting, Agyepong cites Viola Davis and Michaela Coel as major influences.

=== Television ===
In 2023, Agyepong starred in the Amazon Prime Video series The Power, based on the science fiction book by Naomi Alderman. As of 2025, she is part of the forthcoming Netflix project called Joy, which follows the story of the first baby conceived through in vitro fertilization.

== Personal life ==
On March 25, 2023, Agyepong was asked to leave the Museum of Modern Art in New York City after a disagreement with another museum attendee at an exhibition called Black Power Naps. The museum subsequently issued a public apology, saying it will increase efforts to "protect the experiences of Black visitors and visitors from Indigenous communities and communities of colour."

== Group photography exhibitions ==
- Starting Something New: Recent Contemporary Art Acquisitions and Gifts, Mead Art Museum, Amherst College, Amherst, Massachusetts, 2019–2021
- Wish You Were Here, Format Festival, Derby, 2021

== Awards ==
- Jerwood Foundation New Work Fund award for The Body Remembers
- 2018: Nominated, South Bank Sky Arts Breakthrough Award
- 2021: Co-winner, with Joanne Coates, Jerwood/Photoworks Awards – a £15,000 award.
- 2025: Best Actress nomination for Shifters, Olivier Awards

== Filmography ==
=== Film ===
| Year | Title | Role | Notes |
|---|---|---|---|
| 2020 | Sylvia | Kemi | Short film |
| 2023 | Snowfalls in the Summer | Young Anita | Short film |
| 2024 | Joy | Kathy Gibson | |

=== Television ===
| Year | Title | Role | Notes |
|---|---|---|---|
| 2020 | Enterprice | Emily | Episode: "When We Roar, Dem Run" |
| 2022 | This Is Going to Hurt | Rachel | Miniseries; 1 episode |
| 2023 | The Power | Ndudi | Main cast |

=== Theatre ===
| Year | Title | Role | Venue | Notes |
|---|---|---|---|---|
| 2013 | Antigone | Tiresias | T24 Drama, Canterbury | |
| 2015 | 4.48 Psychosis | Voice #2 | T24 Drama, Canterbury | |
| 2016 | Switch | Matilda Swoon | Tricycle Theatre, London | As part of Tricycle's Young Company |
| 2016 | Still Barred | Yaz | Battersea Arts Centre, London | |
| 2016 | Hatch | Amma Boateng | Hackney Showroom, London | With Talawa Theatre Company |
| 2016 | Girls | Haleema | Soho Theatre, London | With Talawa Theatre Company |
| 2017 | Jagged Edge | Colette | Rich Mix, London | |
| 2017 | Best Friends | Vicky | Ovalhouse, London | |
| 2017 | So Many Reasons | Melissa | Ovalhouse, London | |
| 2017 | Sankara | Flore | Royal National Theatre, London | |
| 2019 | Noughts & Crosses | Persephone (Sephy) Mira Hadley | Derby Theatre followed by UK tour | |
| 2022 | Celebrated Virgins | Sarah | Theatr Clwyd, Mold | |
| 2023 | School Girls; Or, the African Mean Girls Play | Ama | Lyric Theatre, London | |
| 2024 | Shifters | Des | Bush Theatre followed by Duke of York's Theatre (West End transfer) | |
| 2026 | Shifters | Des | Cherry Lane Theatre (Off-Broadway) | US theatrical debut |

== Collections ==
Agyepong's work is held in the following permanent collections:

- Mead Art Museum, Amherst College, Amherst, Massachusetts
- National Portrait Gallery, London
