= Benedict Lombe =

Congolese-British writer

- Born: 1991 or 1992 (age 34); Kinshasa, Democratic Republic of the Congo
- Education: Bournemouth University
- Occupations: Playwright and screenwriter
- Writing career
- Subjects: Diasporic experiences, Black British identity
- Notable awards: Susan Smith Blackburn Prize (2022)

Benedict Lombe is a Congolese-British writer. She has won multiple awards as a playwright, including the Susan Smith Blackburn Prize (2022) for her debut play Lava (2021). Her play Shifters premiered at Bush Theatre in 2024 and transferred to the Duke of York's Theatre in the same year, making Lombe the third ever Black British woman to have a play staged in the West End.

== Early life and education ==
Lombe was born in Kinshasa, Democratic Republic of the Congo. She moved to the UK as a child, residing in Wigan from the age of 12 until moving away for university. She attended Bournemouth University, earning a Bachelor of Arts in Scriptwriting for Film and TV in 2013.

== Career ==
After finishing university, Lombe co-founded The Rat’s Nest Theatre Company with her friend Charlotte Rogers with the help of a grant from their university. With the company, Lombe and Rogers co-wrote and co-produced Chaos by Design, a play about the struggles of women in the DRC. The piece was performed at the Edinburgh Fringe in August 2013, followed by a special run in Bournemouth in October as part of Black History Month celebrations.

In 2019, Lombe was selected for the 503FIVE scheme at Theatre503, where she completed a writing residency. She has also been an attachment writer at the National Theatre and has been part of the Emerging Writers' Group at the Bush Theatre, where both of her major plays, Lava and Shifters, were premiered.

In 2026, Lombe was named by critic Dominic Cavendish in The Telegraph as one of the "six most exciting playwrights in Britain".

=== Lava ===
Lava, a one-woman play starring Ronkẹ Adékoluẹjo and directed by Anthony Simpson-Pike, opened at the Bush in 2021. It went on to win the 2022 Susan Smith Blackburn Prize - the oldest and largest prize honouring women+ playwrights writing for English-speaking theatre. Lombe thus became one of the first playwrights to win the prize for a debut play. Lava also won prizes at the Black British Theatre Awards and a 2022 Offie, and it was nominated for the Alfred Fagon Award for Best New Play of the Year.

=== Shifters ===
Lombe's next play Shifters, a two-hander romance starring Tosin Cole and Heather Agyepong, directed by Lynette Linton, opened in 2024 to widespread acclaim from UK theatre press. Shifters transferred to the Duke of York's Theatre in the West End from 12 August to 12 October 2024. Shifters was nominated for Best New Play for the 2025 Olivier Awards (making Lombe the first Black British woman to achieve this nomination).

The play is set to make its Off-Broadway debut in July 2026 at the Cherry Lane Theatre starring Agyepong and Daniel Ezra.

=== Artistry ===
Among Lombe's writing influences are Lynn Nottage, debbie tucker green and Paula Vogel.

== Awards and nominations ==
Year	Award	Category	Nominated work(s)	Result	Note
2021	Black British Theatre Awards	Book and Lyrics Recognition Award	Body of work	Won	
2021	Alfred Fagon Award		Lava	Shortlisted	
2022	Susan Smith Blackburn Prize		Lava	Won	
2025	Offie	Creation	Shifters	Won	
2025	Laurence Olivier Awards	Best New Play	Shifters	Nominated	
2025	The Stage Debut Awards	Best creative West End debut	Shifters	Nominated	
2025	Clarissa Luard Award		Body of work	Won	Nominated by the David Cohen Prize recipient, Alan Hollinghurst
