= Sweat (play) =

2015 play by Lynn Nottage

- Original language: English
- Written by: Lynn Nottage
- Setting: Reading, Pennsylvania

Premiere
- Date: 2015
- Place: Oregon Shakespeare Festival

Sweat is a 2015 play by American playwright Lynn Nottage. It won the 2017 Pulitzer Prize for Drama. The play premiered at the Oregon Shakespeare Festival in 2015; it was produced Off-Broadway in 2016 and on Broadway in 2017. The play is centered on the working class of Reading, Pennsylvania.

== Characters ==
- Evan - African-American, forties; Jason and Chris's Parole Officer. Evan exists only in the 2008 timeline
- Jason - white American of German Descent, twenty-one/twenty-nine; Jason is the son of Tracey and former close friend of Chris
- Chris - African-American, twenty-one/twenty-nine; Chris is the son of Cynthia and Brucie and aspires to attend college. He is the former close friend of Jason
- Stan - white American of German descent, fifties; Stan runs the bar the characters frequent
- Oscar - Colombian-American, twenty-two/thirty; Oscar initially works at the bar with Stan, but goes on to work at the factory
- Tracey - white American of German descent, forty-five/fifty-three. Tracey is the mother of Jason
- Cynthia - African-American, forty-five/fifty-three. Cynthia is the mother of Chris and former wife of Brucie
- Jessie - Italian-American, forties
- Brucie - African-American, forties. Brucie is the father of Chris and former husband of Cynthia

== Plot ==
The play portrays a meeting between a parole officer and two ex-convicts, and three women who were childhood friends and had worked in the same factory. Most of the action takes place in a fictional bar in Reading, Pennsylvania.

There are a group of friends that work for the steel factory, named Tracey, Cynthia and Jessie. Tracey is a middle-aged white woman. She loves to hang out at the bar with her friends and she has a gruff kind of humor. She cannot stand the way Reading has been changing over the years. Her friend Cynthia is a black woman who also loves to hang out with her friends at the bar and is a hardworking woman in the factory. She is on and off with her husband, Brucie, who is addicted to drugs. During the play, Cynthia applies and is hired for a managing job at the plant which causes tension. Jessie, another worker at the factory, is not so happy with how her life has turned out and has a problem with alcohol abuse. This is shown in many of the bar scenes. Stan, the bartender, used to work at the plant, but he was injured in a factory accident. Oscar, the busboy at the bar, is Colombian and is not acknowledged often by the patrons. Some characters use xenophobic slurs towards Latinos and show him that he isn't welcome in the Olstead factory. Jason is a white man who is Tracey's son. His best friend is Chris, Cynthia’s son. They both work at the factory and worry that they will be laid off. They both are arrested for assault and are released eight years later.

Nottage shifts in time, switching scenes and showing events of eight years earlier. Variety quotes the bartender, Stan, as warning the other characters that "You could wake up tomorrow and all your jobs are in Mexico", to which the characters respond with lethargy and disbelief. Variety described Nottage as going into "the heart of working-class America". Reviews of the play have described the characters as representing blue-collar workers who voted in Donald Trump as president.

The play also examines the disintegration of a friendship, after two of the women – one white, one black – apply for the same management job. The latter character gets the position, but soon the company moves jobs to Mexico. The trade union goes on strike, and company management locks out the workers. The management/worker division begins to separate the friends, and racial tensions separate them further.

== Background ==
Lynn Nottage, originally born and raised in Brooklyn, New York wrote the award-winning play, Sweat. Lynn Nottage began working on the play in 2011 by interviewing numerous residents of Reading, Pennsylvania, which at the time was, according to the United States Census Bureau, officially one of the poorest cities in America, with a poverty rate of over 40%. The play was produced off-Broadway in 2016, and on-Broadway in 2017, eventually winning the Pulitzer prize award for drama in 2017. Nottage has said that she was particularly influenced by a New York Times article reporting on the city specifically, and by the Occupy Wall Street movement more generally. Before this, her inspiration came from her family. Mainly the women in her family who were teachers, activists, and artists. She witnessed these strong spoken women growing up, and wanted to do the same herself. She explored the effects on residents of the loss of heavy industry and the changing ethnic composition of the city. She has compared her time talking to former steelworkers in Reading with the occasion when she stayed in the town of Mansfield in the English Midlands and interviewed workers during the 1984 miners' strike. Nottage herself even spoke at the strike, which is what made her realize she had to do more. Seeing the effects of job loss and the economic struggle these people were facing first hand is what truly inspired her work for the play Sweat.

== Critical reception ==
The play has been described as "a powerful and emotional look at identity, race, economy, and humanity."

The play's political context has also been noted. Reviews focused on the similarities between the portrayal of the industrial working class in a Rust Belt town, and that being a significant area and demographic in the 2016 United States presidential election. The Wall Street Journal review suggested the play "explained" Trump's win. It said that the city was "synonymous with deindustrialisation", for the effects there of loss of heavy industry and related jobs.

The New Yorker said the play was "the first theatrical landmark of the Trump era". It also suggested that the play was reminiscent of the "working-class naturalism" of Clifford Odets, a playwright of the 1930s. The characters portrayed were associated with Trump's election campaign phrase of "the forgotten people". The Los Angeles Times also states, "The play seemed to analytically grasp what too many political pundits had missed: the seething anger that turned a reliable blue state such as Pennsylvania red".

== Production history ==
Sweat was first performed at the Oregon Shakespeare Festival in 2015 before playing at the Arena Stage in Washington, D.C. that year.

After starting previews on October 18, 2016, Sweat opened Off-Broadway at The Public Theater on November 3, 2016. It closed on December 18, 2016 to transfer to Broadway. Directed by Kate Whoriskey (who also directed the earlier productions), the cast featured Carlo Alban (Oscar), James Colby (Stan), Khris Davis (Chris), Johanna Day (Tracey), John Earl Jelks (Brucie), Will Pullen (Jason), Miriam Shor (Jessie), Lance Coadie Williams (Evan), and Michelle Wilson (Cynthia). The production began previews on Broadway at Studio 54 on March 4, 2017, before opening on March 26. The production closed on June 25, 2017, after 105 performances.

A London production opened at the Donmar Warehouse on 7 December 2018, running until 2 February 2019. The play was directed by Lynette Linton, and featured Clare Perkins and Martha Plimpton as the mothers and Osy Ikhile (Chris) and Parick Gibson (Jason). A five-star review of the production by Peter Mason in the Morning Star newspaper described Sweat as "a tension-filled drama with a turbulent, consuming plot and a cast of highly engaging characters who demand attention from the off," adding of the Donmar cast that "it would be difficult to imagine a better set of players to take on the difficult task of portraying such complex individuals". The production transferred to the West End's Gielgud Theatre, running from 7 June 2019 to 20 July.

The Guthrie Theater ran a production from July 16 to August 21, 2022. Rohan Preston of the Star Tribune wrote of a key scene, saying "it puts an emotional capstone on a play that gives voice to some of the aches and frustrations that animate a nation unmoored by job displacement, thwarted dreams and self-medication."

A Sydney Theatre Company production ran from 15 November to 22 December 2024.

== Awards and nominations ==
=== Original Off-Broadway and Broadway production ===
Year	Award	Category	Nominee	Result	Ref
2017	Pulitzer Prize for Drama		Lynn Nottage	Won	
2017	Tony Awards	Best Play	Lynn Nottage	Nominated	
2017	Tony Awards	Best Featured Actress in a Play	Johanna Day	Nominated	
2017	Tony Awards	Best Featured Actress in a Play	Michelle Wilson	Nominated	
2017	Drama Desk Award	Outstanding Play	Lynn Nottage	Nominated	
2017	Drama Desk Award	Outstanding Fight Choreography	U. Jonathan Toppo	Won	
2017	Drama League Award	Outstanding Production of a Play		Nominated	
2017	Drama League Award	Distinguished Performance Award	Johanna Day	Nominated	
2017	Drama League Award	Distinguished Performance Award	Michelle Wilson	Nominated	
2017	Outer Critics Circle Awards	Outstanding New Broadway Play		Nominated	
2017	Outer Critics Circle Awards	Outstanding Director of a Play	Kate Whoriskey	Nominated	
2017	Outer Critics Circle Awards	Outstanding Featured Actress in a Play	Johanna Day	Nominated	
2017	Theatre World Award		Carlo Albán	Won	
2017	Obie Award	Playwriting	Lynn Nottage	Won	
2017	New York Drama Critics' Circle Award	Best Play	Lynn Nottage	Runner-up	

=== Original London production ===
Year	Award	Category	Nominee	Result	Ref
2019	Laurence Olivier Award	Best New Play		Nominated	
2019	Black British Theatre Award	Best Supporting Male Actor in a Play	Osy Ikhile	Nominated	
2019	Black British Theatre Award	Best Director	Lynette Linton	Won	
2019	Evening Standard Theatre Award	Best Play	Lynn Nottage	Won	
2019	South Bank Sky Arts Award	Theatre		Nominated	
2019	Stage Debut Award	Best Actor in a Play	Patrick Gibson	Nominated	
2019	Stage Debut Award	Best Creative West End Debut	Frankie Bradshaw and Lynette Linton	Won	
2020	Casting Directors' Guild Award	Best Casting in a Theatre Production	Amy Ball	Nominated	
