= For Heaven's Sake =

For Heaven's Sake may refer to:

- For Heaven's Sake (1926 film), a comedy starring Harold Lloyd
- For Heaven's Sake (1950 film), a fantasy starring Clifton Webb
- For Heaven's Sake (2008 film), a film starring Florence Henderson
- For Heaven's Sake (comic strip), a religion-themed strip by Mike Morgan
- For Heaven's Sake (play), a 2012 play by Laura Pedersen
- "For Heaven's Sake", a song by Donald Meyer, Elise Bretton and Sherman Edwards
- "For Heaven's Sake", a song by 16 Horsepower from Low Estate
- "For Heaven's Sake", a song by Frankie Goes to Hollywood from Liverpool
- "For Heaven's Sake", a song by Wu-Tang Clan from Wu-Tang Forever
