= Jenny Jules =

English actor

Jenny Jules is an English actor. She started her acting career as a member of the youth theatre programme at the Tricycle Theatre in Kilburn, London. Her career has been closely linked with the Tricycle Theatre where she has acted numerous times; her credits there include two plays by August Wilson, both directed by Paulette Randall: Two Trains Running and Gem of the Ocean, Walk Hard by Abram Hill, Wine in the Wilderness by Alice Childress, the dramatic reconstruction (by Richard Norton-Taylor) of the inquiry into the murder of Stephen Lawrence, The Colour of Justice, and Lynn Nottage's Fabulation, directed by Indhu Rubasingham. In 1992, she won a Time Out Award for her portrayal of Mediyah in Pecong at the Tricycle Theatre. That same year, she appeared with Helen Mirren on the second instalment of Prime Suspect for Granada Television/ITV.

Kathy Burke directed Jules in Debbie Tucker Green's Born Bad at the Hampstead Theatre, and Jules has also performed in Eve Ensler's Vagina Monologues more than 100 times in the West End and elsewhere. She has performed in a variety of leading roles at the Almeida Theatre, notably in A Chain Play, Theodore Ward's Big White Fog and Harold Pinter's The Homecoming, both directed by Michael Attenborough, and in 2010, Indhu Rubasingham directed her in Lynn Nottage's Ruined.

In 2009, she played Jane Pilkings in Wole Soyinka's Death and the King's Horseman at the National Theatre. In 2010, she played Ruth Younger in Michael Buffong's production of A Raisin in the Sun at the Manchester Royal Exchange, a performance that won her a Manchester Evening News Theatre Award for Best Supporting Actress.

In 2011, she returned to the role of Mama Nadi in Charles Randolph-Wright's production of Nottage's Ruined at the Arena Stage in Washington, D.C. That same year, Jules won the Critics' Circle Theatre Award for Best Actress for her turn as Mama Nadi in Ruined.

In 2012, she played Mavis in Michael Buffong's production of Moon on a Rainbow Shawl by Errol John at the National Theatre, and Regan in King Lear at the Almeida Theatre, directed by Michael Attenborough. In 2013 Jules spent most of the year playing Cassius in Phyllida Lloyd's all-female production of Julius Caesar, first at the Donmar Warehouse in London, later transferring to St. Ann's Warehouse in Brooklyn.

In 2014, Jules played Penny in Suzan-Lori Parks' new play, Father Comes Home from the Wars, Parts 1, 2 & 3, at The Public Theater in New York and then at the American Repertory Theater in Boston. She made her Broadway debut in 2016 as Tituba in Ivo van Hove's production of The Crucible at the Walter Kerr Theatre, which starred Ciarán Hinds, Sophie Okonedo, and Saoirse Ronan. In March of 2019, Jules took over the role of Hermione Granger (from Noma Dumezweni) in the Broadway production of Harry Potter and the Cursed Child.

== Family ==
Since 1992, she has been married to actor Ralph Brown.
