= Lava (play) =

2021 play by Benedict Lombe

- Original language: English
- Written by: Benedict Lombe
- Subject: Migration

Premiere
- Date: 9 July 2021
- Place: Bush Theatre
- Directed by: Anthony Simpson-Pike
- Original run: 9 July – 7 August 2021

Lava is a one-woman show by Congolese-British playwright Benedict Lombe, which premiered at the Bush Theatre, an Off-West End venue, in 2021. The play follows a woman who explores her own life history and identity after being contacted by the British passport office. For her work, Lombe won the 2022 Susan Smith Blackburn Prize.

== Background and development ==
Benedict Lombe was born in Kinshasa in the Democratic Republic of the Congo and later migrated to England, settling in Wigan from the age of 12. Prior to Lava, she previously wrote the play Chaos by Design, which depicted the struggles of women from her birth country and was staged at the Edinburgh Fringe Festival in 2013.

Lombe became member of Bush Theatre's Writers Group in 2019 and the following year, she was commissioned by the same theatre to write a monologue for its Protest Series, a response to the murder of George Floyd. For this commission, she wrote and performed in the short film Do You Hear Us Now?, which was published on the theatre's website. The short film fed into the development of Lava and was also projected onto the stage's backdrop at one point during the play.

In an interview ahead of the play's premiere in 2021, Lombe stated that the title of the play came from the image of a volcanic eruption, causing deaths and forced displacements:

There is a volcano called Mount Nyiragongo in Congo – the country of my birth – in the city of Goma. It last erupted nearly twenty years ago – killing 250 people and displacing 120,000. As I write these words, reports are coming in that it just erupted again – on Saturday May 22 – sparking thousands to flee the city, with many reliving the trauma of twenty years ago. This is very real – it has uprooted so many lives and continues to do so. When I started to write the play, that image stuck with me, along with a question: this process, this destruction, this displacement – what else could it represent?

== Plot ==
The play is a semi-autobiographical story about a woman who receives a letter from the British passport office asking why her South African passport doesn't have her first name listed. As she searches for answers herself, the show explores her upbringing in the Democratic Republic of Congo during the time of Mobutu Sese Seko's dictatorship and post-apartheid South Africa before moving to Ireland and England, as well as the legal and political challenges of immigration. The protagonist remains nameless throughout the show, referred to only as "Her", before being eventually revealed to be Benedict Lombe herself.

== Production history ==
Lava first premiered in 2021 Off-West End at the Bush Theatre in London, starring Ronkẹ Adékoluẹjo and directed by Anthony Simpson-Pike. The production ran from 9 July to 7 August 2021, with it also being available for international streaming from 16 to 21 August in the same year. The production received critical acclaim, with The Guardian giving the show four stars, praising Adékoluẹjo's performance as "luminous" and The Times lauded it as "brilliant, blistering theatre."

Lombe won the 2022 Susan Smith Blackburn Prize for the play, receiving a cash prize of $25,000. It was the first time that the prize was awarded to a debut play.

Lava was also shortlisted for the 2021 Alfred Fagon Award and in the same year nominated for three Black British Theatre Awards. Ronkẹ Adékọluẹ́jọ́ received an Offie nomination for her performance in the play the following year.

== Awards and nominations ==
Year	Award	Category	Nominee	Result	Ref.
2021	Black British Theatre Awards	Best Production of a Play		Nominated	
2021	Black British Theatre Awards	Best Director for a Play or Musical	Anthony Simpson-Pike	Nominated	
2021	Black British Theatre Awards	Best Female Actor in a Play	Ronkẹ Adékoluẹjo	Nominated	
2021	Alfred Fagon Award		Benedict Lombe	Shortlisted	
2022	Susan Smith Blackburn Prize		Benedict Lombe	Won	
2022	Offie	Performance Piece	Ronke Adékoluejo	Nominated	
