= Ronkẹ Adékọluẹ́jọ́ =

English actress

- Born: 1991/1992; East London
- Education: Royal Academy of Dramatic Art
- Occupation: Actress
- Years active: 2014–present

Ronkẹ Adékọluẹ́jọ́ (/ˈrɒŋkeɪ əˌdɛkəˈluːədʒoʊ/ RONG-kay ə-DEK-ə-LOO-ə-joh) (born 1991/1992) is an English actress. She is known for her roles as Jack Starbright in the Amazon Prime spy thriller Alex Rider (2020–2024) and Yvonne in the Netflix musical film Been So Long (2018). She also guest-starred in two episodes of Doctor Who (2017).

On stage, her work includes Three Sisters at the National Theatre, (2020), Lava at Bush Theatre, (2021), and Blues for an Alabama Sky (2022).

== Early life ==
Ronkẹ Adékọluẹ́jọ́ was born in Hackney and raised in Barking, London. She is of Nigerian Yoruba ancestry. Adékọluẹ́jọ́ was a pupil at Jo Richardson Community School, where she excelled in Drama, achieving one of the national top 10 highest grades in the subject at GCSE.

Adékọluẹ́jọ́ studied acting for three years from 2010 at the Royal Academy of Dramatic Art (RADA), in London, graduating in 2013 with a Bachelor of Arts degree in acting (H Level).

== Theatre ==
Adékọluẹ́jọ́ crafted her acting skills on the theatre stage, in productions such as Pride and Prejudice, at the Sheffield Crucible (2015), The Mountaintop at the Young Vic (2016), and Twelfth Night at the Filter Theatre in Hammersmith (2016). In 2020, Adékọluẹ́jọ́ appeared on stage in the role of Abosede in the live-streaming theatre play Three Sisters at National Theatre Live, and was nominated for best classical stage performances by actors under the age of 30 at the Ian Charleson Awards. However, the event was postponed due to the COVID-19 pandemic.

In August 2021, Adékọluẹ́jọ́ performed solo on stage, live-streamed worldwide, in the Benedict Lombe-directed play Lava at the Bush Theatre. She won 'Best Performance Piece' for this work, at The Offies in 2022.

In 2022, she starred as Delia in the all-black American tragicomedy Blues for an Alabama Sky at the National Theatre, written by Pearl Cleage, and based on the Harlem Renaissance in 1930s New York. Her performance earned a nomination at the Evening Standard Theatre Awards for Best Actress.

From November 2024 to January 2025 Adékọluẹ́jọ́ played the role of Gwendolen Fairfax in The Importance of Being Earnest at the National Theatre.

== Film and television ==
From 2014, Adékọluẹ́jọ́ had some single-episode appearances in TV series until starring in series 10 of Doctor Who, when she played Penny in both "Extremis" and "The Pyramid at the End of the World", alongside Peter Capaldi (the Twelfth Doctor) and his companion Pearl Mackie. Adékọluẹ́jọ́ starred as Demi-Lea Sadler in the "Nadia Cavelle" short film Lascivious Grace, which premiered at the Underwire Film festival 2017 and was an official film selection for the Bermuda International Film Festival 2018. Adékọluẹ́jọ́ was nominated for best actor at Underwire Film Festival 2017 for her performance in the short film Lascivious Grace.

In 2018, Ronke starred in the Tinge Krishnan-directed Netflix musical Been So Long, as the character Yvonne, best friend of Simone, played by lead actress Michaela Coel. The film was shown at the 2018 BFI London Film Festival. In 2019, Adékọluẹ́jọ́ landed a main role in the Amazon Prime teenage spy thriller television series Alex Rider as Jack Starbright, Alex Rider's American primary carer and mentor.

In 2021, Adékọluẹ́jọ́ played Ṣadé in the pilot of the Channel 4 television production Big Age.

== Filmography ==
=== Film ===
Year	Title	Role	Notes
	K & J	Joan	Short film
2014	Broken	Sabrina	Short film
2016	One Crazy Thing	Bus Passenger #1	
2017	Stay the Burning		Short film
2017	Lascivious Grace	Demi-Lea Sadler	Short film
2018	Been So Long	Yvonne	
2018	Christopher Robin	Katherine Dane	
2018	Ready Player One	Sorrento's Assistant	
2018	Found	Bab	Short film
2019	Cyprus Avenue	Bridget (Therapist)	
2020	The Big Other	Amina	
2020	The Forgotten C	Mary	Short film
2021	Ear for Eye	UK Friend 1	
2022	Chevalier	Nanon	
2023	Guests	Cecelia	Short film
2025	Dreamers	Isio	It will be screened in Panorama at the 75th Berlin International Film Festival in February 2025.
2026	Elsinore	Nurse Lee	
TBA	The Custom of the Country †		Filming

=== Television ===
Year	Title	Role	Notes
2014	Suspects	Carrie Evans	Episode: "Eyes Closed"
2015	Chewing Gum	Amy	Episode: "Tolled Road"
2016	NW	Grace	TV film
2016	Cold Feet	Bridie Sellers	Episode #6.8
2016	Josh	Policewoman	Episode: "Cut & Dried"
2017	Sick Note	Theatre Nurse	Episode: "Janina Kolkiewicz"
2017	Doctor Who	Penny	2 episodes: "Extremis" and "The Pyramid at the End of the World"
2018	Cuckoo	Job Centre Manager	Episode: "Lawyer of the Year"
2018	Black Earth Rising	Alice's Secretary	Episode: "The Forgiving Earth"
2020	Soulmates	Carly	Episode: "Watershed"
2021	Big Age	Ṣadé	Episode: "Pilot"
2020–2024	Alex Rider	Jack Starbright	23 episodes
2023	Rain Dogs	Gloria	8 episodes
2026	Waiting for the Out	Officer Stephens	5 episodes

=== Live streaming theatre ===
Year	Title	Role
2020	National Theatre Live: Three Sisters	Abosede
2021	Bush Theatre: Lava''	South African woman
2025	National Theatre Live: The Importance of being Earnest	Gwendolen Fairfax

== Awards and nominations ==
Year	Award	Category	Nominated work	Result	Ref.
2017	Underwire Film Festival	Best Actor	Lascivious Grace (Short film)	Nominated	
2020	Ian Charleson Awards		Three Sisters	Nominated	
2020	Black British Theatre Awards	Best Female Actor in a Play	Three Sisters	Nominated	
2020	The Offies	Most Promising New Playwright	Teleportation part of This is Black	Nominated	
2022	The Offies	Best Performance Piece	Lava	Won	
2022	Evening Standard Theatre Awards	Best Actress	Blues For An Alabama Sky	Nominated	
2024	Royal Television Society Programme Awards	Leading Actor: Female	Rain Dogs	Nominated	
