= Ruined (play) =

2008 play by Lynn Nottage

- TCG Editions cover
- Written by: Lynn Nottage
- Original language: English
- Setting: Democratic Republic of Congo

Premiere
- Date premiered: November 8, 2008
- Place premiered: Goodman Theatre, Chicago, IL

Ruined (2008) is an American play by Lynn Nottage. The play premiered at the Goodman Theatre in Chicago, and won the 2009 Pulitzer Prize for Drama. The play explores the plight of women during the civil war in the Democratic Republic of Congo.

== Production history ==
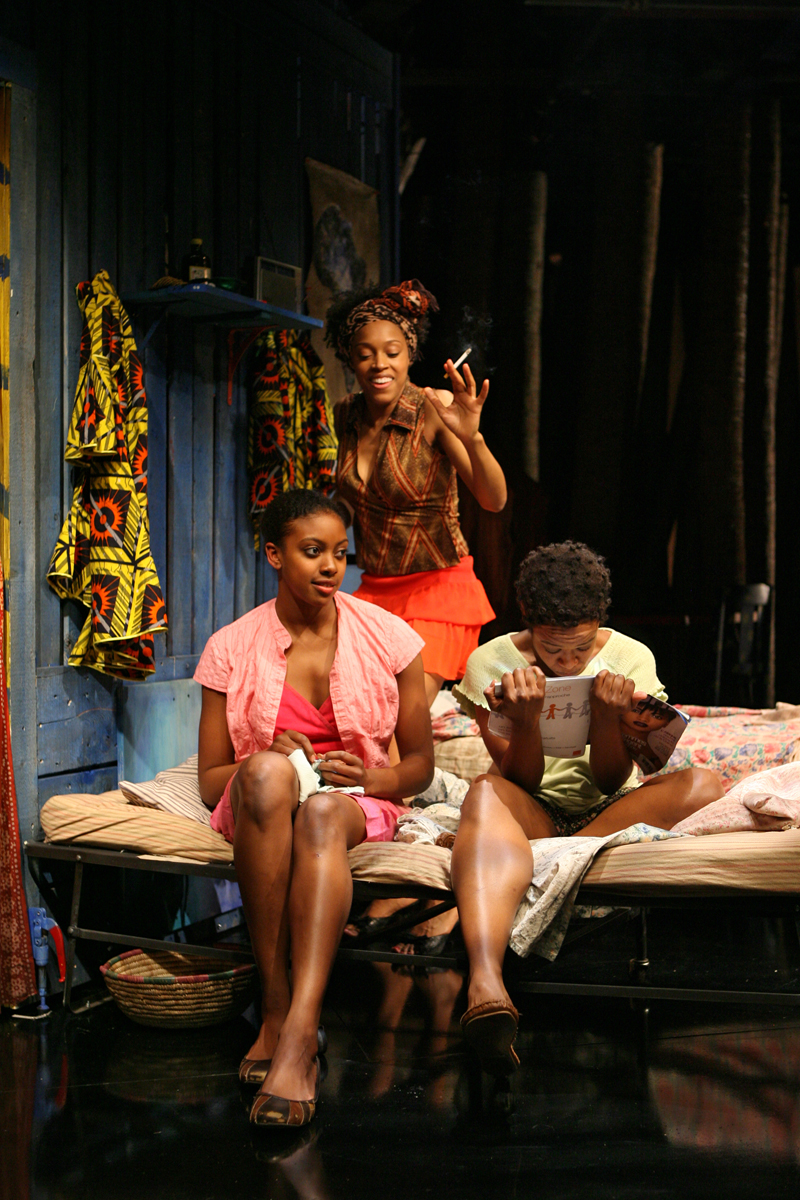
Opening night of Ruined in 2009. Photograph by Joan Marcus.

Ruined was commissioned by the Goodman Theatre (Chicago, Illinois) and is a co-production with the Manhattan Theatre Club. Nottage and director Kate Whoriskey traveled to the Democratic Republic of Congo to interview women as background for the play, which is loosely based on the 1939 play by Bertolt Brecht, Mother Courage and Her Children.

Ruined was first performed in 2007 in the Goodman Theatre New Stages Series. The play premiered on November 8, 2008 at the Goodman Theatre and ran through December 14.

The play opened Off-Broadway at the Manhattan Theatre Club, New York City Center – Stage I in previews on January 21, 2009, and officially on February 10, 2009. The production closed on September 6, 2009, after receiving nine extensions.

Both productions were directed by Kate Whoriskey, with a cast that included Quincy Tyler Bernstine, Cherise Boothe, Condola Rashad, Chiké Johnson, Kevin Mambo, William Jackson Harper, Chris Chalk, Russell G. Jones, Tom Mardirosian, Ron McBee, Simon Shabantu Kashama, and Saidah Arrika Ekulona (Mama Nadi). The latter left the production in May 2009 and was replaced by Portia. Scenic design was by Derek McLane, costume design by Paul Tazewell, lighting design by Peter Kaczorowski, sound design by Rob Milburn and Michael Bodeen, and original music by Dominic Kanza with lyrics by Lynn Nottage.

The European premiere of Ruined, directed by Indhu Rubasingham, opened for previews on April 15, 2010 with press night on April 22, 2010 at the Almeida Theatre in London. It closed on June 5, 2010. The cast included Jenny Jules as "Mama", Lucian Msamati, Pippa Bennett-Warner, Michelle Asante, Kehinde Fadipe, Okezie Morro, Silas Carson, David Ajala, Joel Kangudi, Steve Toussaint, and Damola Adelaja. Jenny Jules won the 2010 Critics' Circle Theatre Award for Best Actress for her performance.

Ruined was performed at the Oregon Shakespeare Festival in 2010, directed by Liesl Tommy.

The Canadian premiere of Ruined was presented by Ellipsis Tree Collective in Calgary, Alberta, August 2010.

It ran at the Denver Center for the Performing Arts through April 30, 2011.

An Obsidian Theatre Company in association with Nightwood Theatre production in Toronto, Ontario at the Berkeley Street Theatre in 2011 starred Sterling Jarvis and Yanna McIntosh.

Ruined had its Australian premiere by THAT Production Company in Ipswich, Queensland in 2013. It was directed and designed by Timothy Wynn and produced by Cassandra Ramsay, as a part of the Ipswich Festival. The production featured many actors who had fled the Congolese War and had relocated to South-East Queensland. Lynn Nottage sent a personal message to the team, encouraging the production's premiere. The production was included in THAT Production Company's nomination for a Groundling Award, for Outstanding Contribution to Theatre in Queensland.

== Overview ==
The setting is a small tin mining town in the Democratic Republic of Congo. Mama Nadi owns a poolroom and a bar and has customers who are both miners and soldiers of various factions. Despite an attempt to stay neutral, Mama Nadi finds that the factions continue to disrupt the nearby towns and mines. Mama Nadi's bar is open to all. Her waitresses "provide more than whiskey and food."

According to Playbill, "Nottage was planning a play on the war in Iraq, but newspaper reports rechanneled her focus to Africa, where she and her director, Kate Whoriskey, went in the summer of 2004....The specific target in this war is women, and the weapon of choice is rape and sexual abuse."

== Critical response ==
Ben Brantley in his The New York Times review, wrote: "Ms. Nottage, the wide-ranging and increasingly confident author of Intimate Apparel and Fabulation or, the Re-Education of Undine, hooks her audience with promises of a conventionally structured, purposefully plotted play, stocked with sympathetic characters and informative topical detail. She delivers on those promises. Yet a raw and genuine agony pulses within and finally bursts through this sturdy framework, giving Ruined an impact that lingers beyond its well-shaped, sentimental ending. . . . Ms. Nottage has endowed the frail-looking Sophie, as well as the formidable Mama, with a strength that transforms this tale of ruin into a clear-eyed celebration of endurance."

== Awards and nominations ==
Pulitzer Prize

- Pulitzer Prize for Drama - Winner

Drama Desk Awards

- Outstanding Play – Winner
- Outstanding Actress in a Play, Saidah Arrika Ekulona – (nomination)
- Outstanding Featured Actress in a Play, Condola Rashad – (nomination)
- Outstanding Director of a Play, Kate Whoriskey – (nomination)
- Outstanding Music in a Play, Dominic Kanza - Winner

Outer Critics Circle Award

- Outstanding New Off-Broadway Play – Winner
- Outstanding Lighting Design (Play or Musical) – Peter Kaczorowski (nomination)
- Outstanding Actress in a Play – Saidah Arrika Ekulona (nomination)
- Outstanding Featured Actress in a Play – Condola Rashad (nomination)

Drama League Award

- Distinguished Production of a Play (nomination)
- Distinguished Performance Award, Saidah Arrika Ekulona (nomination)

Lucille Lortel Award

- Outstanding Play (Manhattan Theatre Club and Goodman Theatre, Producer; Lynn Nottage, Playwright) – Winner
- Outstanding Director (nomination)
- Outstanding Lead Actress – Saidah Arrika Ekulona Winner

Obie Awards

- Best New American Play Winner
- Performance

Quincy Tyler Bernstine Winner
Saidah Arrika Ekulona Winner
Russell Gebert Jones Winner

== In print ==
Theatre Communications Group has published the script. Ruined began stocking in stores November 1, 2009.

== See also ==
- Sexual violence in the Democratic Republic of the Congo
