= Lynette Linton =

British playwright and artistic director

Lynette Linton FRSL
- Born: Lynette Margaret Linton; January 1990 (age 36); Leytonstone, London
- Education: University of Sussex; National Youth Theatre
- Occupation: Playwright; Director; Artistic Director at the Bush Theatre

Lynette Margaret Linton FRSL (born January 1990) is a BAFTA-nominated British playwright, director, dramaturg and the artistic director at The Bush Theatre. She directed the award-winning Donmar Warehouse production of Sweat. In 2019 she was named as one of Marie Claire's "Future Shapers".

== Early life and education ==
Linton is of British Caribbean heritage and grew up in Leytonstone, East London. Her father is from Guyana and her mother is from Northern Ireland. Linton became interested in theatre and writing as a child. She has said that she wanted to be Malorie Blackman. At the age of eight she moved to Ballymena, where she and her brothers experienced racism. She studied English at the University of Sussex and soon afterwards joined the National Youth Theatre. Here she met Rikki Beadle-Blair, who encouraged her to write a play. The play she wrote – Step – was about a young man working out his sexuality, inspired by James Baldwin. It was programmed at the Theatre Royal Stratford East. Linton's writing explores who she is and where her family are from. She trained as a Director at StoneCrabs in 2013.

== Career ==
In 2014 Linton founded the production company Black Apron Entertainment, which was named after the uniforms worn by her and her colleagues Daniel Bailey and Gino Green at their first jobs in John Lewis. Black Apron Entertainment have produced several plays and short films, including Passages: A Windrush Celebration at the Royal Court Theatre. Passages included seven monologue films that were written in response to the Windrush scandal.

In 2016, she was appointed as assistant director at the Gate Theatre. Linton directed Lynn Nottage's play Sweat at the Donmar Warehouse in 2018. The success of the production, which starred Clare Perkins, Martha Plimpton, Osy Ikhile and Parick Gibson, resulted in it transferring to the Gielgud Theatre in 2019. It was awarded the 2019 Evening Standard "Play of the Year" award. Her production of Richard II was the first ever all women of colour company performing a Shakespeare play on a UK stage.

In 2019 it was announced that Linton would become the artistic director of The Bush Theatre. Her appointment has been celebrated by the UK theatrical community, which is dominated by white men. When asked about the reason she applied for the job, she quoted James Baldwin, "The place in which I'll fit will not exist until I make it." She set out to make the theatre more welcoming to traditionally minoritized groups, including people of colour and those from working-class backgrounds. Her first season as artistic director started with a revival of Jackie Kay's Chiaroscuro and several other works by British writers of colour. The Evening Standard remarked that in terms of "sheer emotional power", nothing came close to Linton's Chiaroscuro. Linton stepped down from her role at Bush Theatre in spring 2026, succeeded by Taio Lawson.

She was selected as one of the Marie Claire "Future Shapers" in 2019. She was named as one of London's most influential people in the Evening Standard's Progress List. Linton also featured on the Evening Standard list of "London women changing the world" for International Women's Day 2022.

== Theatrical works ==
=== Writing ===
Linton has written for Theatre Royal Stratford East and the Arcola Theatre, among other theatres.

- 2013: Step
- 2015: 'Chicken Palace
- 2017: Hashtag Lightie

=== Directing ===
- 2014: This Wide Night at Albany Theatre
- 2015: Assata: She Who Struggles at the Young Vic
- 2016: The Rally at Theatre Royal Stratford East
- 2017: Assata Taught Me at the Gate Theatre
- 2018: This Is
- 2018: Sweat at the Donmar Warehouse
- 2019: Richard II at Shakespeare's Globe (co-directed with Adjoa Andoh)
- 2022: Blues for an Alabama Sky at the National Theatre
- 2022: House of Ife at the Bush Theatre
- 2023: Clydes at the Donmar Warehouse
- 2024: Shifters at the Bush Theatre (also West End Transfer Duke of York)
- 2024: Barcelona at Duke of York
- 2025: Alterations at the National Theatre
- 2025: Intimate Apparel at the Donmar Warehouse
- 2026: The Boy Who Harnessed the Wind at the Royal Shakespeare Company
