= Crumbs from the Table of Joy =

1995 play by Lynn Nottage

Crumbs from the Table of Joy is a play written by Lynn Nottage.

== Production history ==
The play premiered Off-Broadway at the Second Stage Theatre from May 9, 1995, through July 1, 1995. Directed by Joe Morton, the cast featured Kisha Howard (Ernestine), Nicole Leach, Daryl Edwards (Godfrey), Ella Joyce and Stephanie Roth. The play was commissioned by Second Stage, as part of their program for teen audiences. Ben Brantley, in his review for The New York Times wrote that the play "has an adolescent quality, suggestive of a playwright still struggling to emerge from studied imitativeness into her own mature voice." Other reviews were more positive. The New York Post wrote: "Imagine a pairing ... between Tennessee Williams and Lorraine Hansberry, a memory play about a black family, a glass menagerie in the sun." The Chicago Sun-Times called Nottage's family drama "a complex, thought-provoking play."

The play was produced at South Coast Repertory, Costa Mesa, California, from September 17, 1996, through October 20. Directed by Seret Scott the cast featured Dorian Harewood as Godfrey. The Press Enterprise reviewer wrote "Seret Scott has directed a strong, frequently moving and frequently amusing production."

The play has received many regional productions in the US, including Steppenwolf Theatre, Chicago, Illinois, March 5–30, 1996 and Crossroads Theater Company, New Brunswick, New Jersey in March 1998. It was produced at Oregon Shakespeare Festival Oregon Shakespeare Festival, Ashland, Oregon,THE DAILY, March - November, 1999. Directed by Seret Scott the cast featured Garland Nominated Melany Bell as Ernestine Crump sfgate.com/entertainment/article/oregon-shakespeare-fest-s-y2k-lineup-3079106.php" September 17, 1996,Center Stage, Baltimore, Maryland, from May 5 - June 11, 2006, at the Goodman Theatre, Chicago, Illinois, from June 6–25, 2006, and at the Keen Company, Theater Row, New York City, from February 21-April 1, 2023, and the Everyman Theatre in Baltimore, Maryland, from January 28 - February 25, 2024.

== Plot ==
The play takes place in Brooklyn in 1950. An African-American man, Godfrey Crump, grieving over his wife's death, finds new meaning in religion. He moves his family, Ernestine, a 17-year-old and Ermina, 15 years old, from Florida to Brooklyn. Their Aunt Lily espouses Communist sentiments and Godfrey's new wife is not only a white woman, but German.

Nottage has said of the play (in the booklet that accompanied the Center Stage production, page 4): "The 1950s was such a moment in American history in which I felt so much change...everything I had seen was in black and white. And I wanted to make it colorful. So I started writing Crumbs from the Table of Joy to try to understand that era."
