= For Heaven's Sake (play) =

For Heaven's Sake! (The Brightness of Heaven)
- Program Cover, Cherry Lane Theatre, 2014
- Original language: American English
- Written by: Laura Pedersen
- Characters: Kilgannon family
- Setting: Buffalo, New York (1974)

Premiere
- Date: Manhattan Repertory Theatre, New York City (2012)
- Official website

For Heaven's Sake!, originally titled The Brightness of Heaven, is a full-length play written by Laura Pedersen. Pedersen completed the work in 2012 and it premiered at the Manhattan Repertory Theatre in New York City later that year. It has since been performed at the Off-Broadway Cherry Lane Theatre in Manhattan, and the 710 Main Theatre (formerly Studio Arena Theater), in Buffalo, NY.

The play was the finalist in the Maxim Mazumder New Play Competition, a finalist in the Ashland New Plays Festival, and a finalist in The Hudson Valley Writers' Center New Play Reading Series. NY Theatre Guide ranked the 710 Main production as one of the top five shows of the week.

== Characters ==
- Joyce Kilgannon: Joyce is the mother of the Kilgannon family. At 56, she is part of the older generation in the play. She is a home economics teacher at the local Catholic high school. Joyce is an energetic and positive woman who is set in her ways.
- Edwin Kilgannon: Is the father of the family. He is 57, a year older than his wife Joyce. Edwin is a music teacher at the same local Catholic high school. He's a carefree man who rarely gets angry.
- Brendan Kilgannon: The eldest son of Joyce and Edwin. At 28 he is a charming young man, but unsuccessful in life and suffers from a drinking problem.
- Dennis Kilgannon: Is the second son, aged 27. Unlike his older brother, Dennis is a responsible family man who regularly helps his aging parents and has a wife three young children of his own.
- Kathleen Kilgannon: Is Edwin and Joyce's only daughter. She is the youngest sibling of the family at 23, and is a professional and strong-willed woman.
- Mary Jablonski: Mary is Ed’s younger sister, aged 56. She turned inward and took refuge in her faith after becoming a widow with two young children to raise, who are now grown.
- Grace Jablonski: Grace is eldest of Mary’s children. At 27, she remains single and finds it difficult to have a life with caring for lonely mother, or else uses the task as a way to avoid having a social life.
- Jimmy Jablonski: Mary’s son and the youngest Kilgannon male at 24 years of age. Jimmy is gay, and wants to accept the consequences of living openly without the family forcing him to lie about his sexuality or lie to others about him.

== Synopsis ==
The plot of For Heaven's Sake! follows an Irish Catholic family from Buffalo, NY, in 1974.

The Kilgannons are a typical Irish Catholic clan in Western New York in the 1970s. The action focuses on the changing world and the gap between the differing generations, which is widening. It also examines the way religious beliefs can affect our plans and behaviors. For Heaven's Sake! employs clever dialogue to examine the family's faith along with commonly held beliefs of the time period which test the strength of the bonds between the characters.

The older generation has constructed their lives around salvation with the church as the center of their personal, social, and spiritual lives. The younger generation is not as devout, with more focus on modern-day society and less on praying and following the rules. The two youngest family members, Jimmy and Kathleen, lead the charge to move the Kilgannon's viewpoint in a progressive direction. Their lives are touched by numerous American issues during that era, including Watergate, the Vietnam War and gay liberation. Author John Updike called the time period "The most dissentious American decade since the Civil War."

Some family members have come to accept the constraints of society while others feel trapped. Family mealtimes have become a debate forum for various issues and viewpoints. Will the Kilgannons find the serenity to accept the things they cannot change and the wisdom to know that what needs changing most is sitting around the dinner table? FOR HEAVEN'S SAKE! is about family, faith, and the ties that bind — sometimes too tightly.

Pedersen's life has familiarities with the play. She has stated "The Buffalo, NY, area was 80% Catholic when I was growing up there in the 1970s. It was a hotbed of anti-abortion protests, church basement Bingo and Friday night fish fries. While the church was still reeling from the Second Vatican Council, society was being rocked by the Vietnam War, Watergate, birth control, a recession, an oil crisis, and various progressive movements championing African-Americans, women, Native Americans and the environment. It was a time of religious, political, and cultural upheaval that placed young people in opposition to their elders more than at any other time in recent history. Hair length alone was responsible for a thousand of dinner table fights. Almost all the families I knew were struggling to find their way forward and make sense of a way of life that was unraveling before their eyes. It turns out that mood rings, smiley faces, pet rocks and fuzzy dice affect people in all sorts of different ways."

=== Inspiration ===
“Those who are wise will shine like the brightness of the heavens, and those who lead many to righteousness, like the stars for ever and ever. “ The Bible, —Daniel 12:3

== Productions ==
For Heaven's Sake was first staged in Manhattan in 2012, as The Brightness of Heaven. Its first run was at the Manhattan Repertory Theatre starting on November 1, 2012. The play remained in New York, playing at the Off-Broadway Cherry Lane Theatre. The play was performed from October 26, 2014 to December 14, 2014.

The play ran in Buffalo, New York, under the title, For Heaven's Sake! in the fall of 2015 at the 710 Main Theatre. It was part of the season opening Curtain Up! celebration. All productions were directed by Ludovica Villar-Hauser with Set and Costume Design by Meganne George.

== Reception ==
The play received mainly positive reviews for its portrayal of an Irish Catholic family in Buffalo. Carole Di Tosti said, "The play may be about a Catholic family in the 70s, but on a deeper level it is about human beings grappling with the nature of love. The writing and the acting is so good and the direction so subtle that you root for everyone in different ways and for different reasons. That discussion has no era and has no end." Susan Hasho, Theater Pizzazz wrote, "An intriguing and incisive comedic-dramatic play. Exceptionally directed. Pedersen draws the characterizations profoundly. We see that each of the children years for acceptance and understanding, not realizing the extent to which they may have it, for the "religion" they fight against has at its foundation love and forgiveness if the faith is followed to its fullness…"

Some critics complemented the writing, such as Cindy Pierre, "Laura Pedersen does a great job of mining a topic that many perceive as being far from black and white. Sharp direction . . . Witty banter, good performances, and polished production." Ryan Leeds stated For Heaven's Sake was "a worthy addition to theatrical family dramas. The writing is sharp and well-observed. The staging is skillful and the actors excellent."

Aimee Todoroff of NY Theatre Now stated the play was "a delightful comedy of Faith vs. Reality with an impressive cast and succinct direction. Pedersen has perfectly captured the 1970s."

Of the Western New York production Michael Rabice from Broadway World said "Buffalonians love stories that take place in their backyard, but the tumultuous political times of the early 70's could play out in any suburban working class city."

The play was the finalist in the Maxim Mazumdar New Play Competition, a finalist in the Ashland New Plays Festival, and a finalist in The Hudson Valley Writers' Center New Play Reading Series.
