= Kate Whoriskey =

American director (born 1970)

Kate Whoriskey (born 1970) is a freelance theatre director.

== Personal life ==
Whoriskey grew up in Acton, Massachusetts. She majored in theater at New York University (Experimental Theater Wing) (graduating in 1992) and in 1998 she completed a post-graduate program in directing from the American Repertory Theater's (A.R.T.) Institute for Advanced Theater Training at Harvard University. Whoriskey is married to actor Daniel Breaker who has played Donkey in Shrek the Musical on Broadway. Whoriskey and Breaker have a son, named Rory, born in 2008.

== Professional career ==
After completing her graduate program at ART, she immediately worked on directing a play there, The Master Builder by Ibsen. She has been a visiting lecturer at Princeton University and an associate artist at South Coast Repertory in Orange County, California. She was briefly associated with Intiman Theatre in Seattle, in 2010 to 2011, prior to its closure due to cash flow problems.

== Directing credits ==
A partial list of Whoriskey's directing credits is in the table below.

Sources: Internet Off-Broadway Database Internet Broadway Database American Theatre Wing

Play	Author	Theater	Year and Notes
Ruined	Lynn Nottage	Goodman Theatre and Manhattan Theatre Club	2008
Fabulation, or the Re-Education of Undine	Lynn Nottage	Playwrights Horizons	2004 (world premiere)
Intimate Apparel	Lynn Nottage	South Coast Repertory	2003 (world premiere)
The Piano Teacher	Julia Cho	Vineyard Theatre	2007 (world premiere)
Last Tree in Antarctica	Julia Cho	Ensemble Studio Theatre	2007
Massacre	José Rivera	LAByrinth Theater Company	2005 (world premiere)
The Tempest	William Shakespeare	Shakespeare Theatre Company	2005
Vigils	Noah Haidle	Goodman Theatre	2006 (world premiere)
The Rose Tattoo	Tennessee Williams	Goodman Theatre	2002
Heartbreak House	George Bernard Shaw	Goodman Theatre	2004
The Master Builder	Henrik Ibsen	American Repertory Theater (ART)	1999
Blue/Orange	Joe Penhall	Intiman Theatre	2003
The Lady from the Sea	Henrik Ibsen	Intiman Theatre	2001
Macbeth	William Shakespeare	California Shakespeare Theater	2002
Inked Baby	Christina Anderson	Playwrights Horizons	2009
The Chairs	Eugène Ionesco	Intiman Theatre	2000
Drowning Crow	Regina Taylor	Goodman Theatre	2002 (world premiere)
Life Is a Dream	Pedro Calderón de la Barca	South Coast Repertory	2007
The Caucasian Chalk Circle	Bertolt Brecht	South Coast Repertory	2005
Antigone	Sophocles	South Coast Repertory	2004
The Clean House	Sarah Ruhl	South Coast Repertory	2005
The Miracle Worker	William Gibson (playwright)	Circle in the Square Theatre	2010 - Opening: Mar. 3.
Ruined	Lynn Nottage	Intiman Theatre	2010
How I Learned to Drive	Paula Vogel	Second Stage Theater	2012
Sweat	Lynn Nottage	Oregon Shakespeare Festival	2015 - World Premiere co-produced with Arena Stage (2016) / 2016 - Public Theater / 2017 - Studio 54, Broadway
Tales From Red Vienna	David Grimm	Manhattan Theatre Club	2014
Good People	David Lindsay-Abaire	Huntington Theatre Company	2012

== Other work ==
Other theatres where she has directed include:

- Theatre for a New Audience (New York), Oroonoko, 2008
- Center Stage (theater) (Baltimore, MD) (2003)
- Perseverance Theatre (Alaska) (2000)
- Actors Theatre of Louisville
- Sundance Theatre Lab at the Sundance Institute, (Park City, UT), 2005
- Richard B. Fisher Center for the Performing Arts, (Bard College, Annandale-on-Hudson, NY) (2006)
- The Eugene O'Neill Theater Center (Waterford, CT)
- Geva Theatre Center (Rochester, NY).

In her career, she has also worked with writers Nilo Cruz, Michael Ondaatje, and Saïd Sayrafiezadeh.
