= By the Way, Meet Vera Stark =

2011 play by Lynn Nottage

- Written by: Lynn Nottage
- Setting: 1930s Hollywood

Premiere
- Date: May 9, 2011
- Place: Second Stage Theater

By the Way, Meet Vera Stark is a play by Lynn Nottage. The play concerns an African-American maid in the 1930s who becomes a film star.

== Background ==
Nottage received the 2010 Edgerton Foundation New American Play Award for this play.

== Productions ==
The play premiered Off-Broadway at Second Stage Theater on May 9, 2011, and closed on June 12, 2011. Directed by Jo Bonney, the cast featured Sanaa Lathan (Vera Stark), Stephanie J. Block (Gloria Mitchell), Daniel Breaker (Leroy Barksdale/Herb Forrester), David Garrison (Fredrick Slasvick/Brad Donovan), Kimberly Hebert Gregory (Lottie/Carmen Levy-Green), Kevin Isola (Maximillian Von Oster/Brian Blaze), and Karen Olivo (Anne Mae/Afua Assata Ejob). Sets were by Neil Patel and costumes by ESosa.

The play ran at the Geffen Playhouse in Los Angeles in September 2012, directed by Jo Bonney, starring Sanaa Lathan with Amanda Detmer (Gloria).

The play was produced at the Goodman Theatre in Chicago, Illinois, from April 27 to June 2, 2013.

The play was produced Off-Broadway at Signature Theatre in New York City from January 29 to March 10, 2019.

== Overview ==
According to Second Stage, "Lynn Nottage draws upon the screwball films of the 1930s to take a funny and irreverent look at racial stereotypes in Hollywood. By the Way, Meet Vera Stark is a 70-year journey through the life of Vera Stark, a headstrong African-American maid and budding actress, and her tangled relationship with her boss, a white Hollywood star...desperately grasping to hold on to her career."

The title character of Vera Stark is based in part on black actress Theresa Harris.

== Critical response ==
Ben Brantley, reviewing the Off-Broadway production for The New York Times, wrote: "There are moments throughout Vera Stark, directed by Jo Bonney, that provoke hearty laughter and troubling thoughts at the same time. But none of them come close to matching the fully inhabited, spiky ambivalence of Ms. Lathan as she appears in the second half...But much of the comic material here feels stereotyped in itself, bringing to mind lively but formulaic sketch routines from satiric variety shows like In Living Color. As directed by Ms. Bonney, the acting swings wildly between proper characterization and caricature...More enjoyably, the second act includes a clip from the film that Vera finally made (as imagined by Tony Gerber) and the priceless 1973 talk-show sequence, in which Mr. Garrison is perfect as a fatuous Merv Griffin-esque host."

Charles McNulty, in his review of the Off-Broadway production for the Los Angeles Times, wrote: "The subject of racism in the film industry might not seem like an ideal fit for a comedy with a screwball twist, but Nottage is too clever to preach and too much a fan of the cinematic era she’s writing about not to entertain. The giddiness of the romp isn’t easy to sustain, but her sneaky cultural critique is delivered with an ingenious wink...Nottage is attuned to the specific hardships of African American actors coveting fame throughout history, and her irony detector can’t help beeping as it surveys all the social progress that has been made. But she’s also aware of how anyone in the public eye is forced to sell a part of his or her soul. In this regard, she’s an equal opportunity satirist, sending up the performing seal in all of us."

Bob Verini, in his review for Variety of the Geffen Playhouse production, wrote: "Nottage and Bonney seem to lack much appreciation of, or respect for, the Tinseltown milieu...The second half nevertheless proves richer and more satisfying. For starters three academics, hilariously doubled by Carroll, Gregory and Dandridge, practically come to blows at a modern-day seminar on the meaning of a career that ended in lousy roles, humiliation and eventual disappearance...All the pieces of Nottage’s puzzle never quite click together, and it’s rather ironic for a work whose theme is personal and professional authenticity to keep bringing in so much that’s downright bogus."

== Awards and nominations ==
2012 Drama Desk Award Nominations

- Outstanding Play, Lynn Nottage
- Outstanding Actress in a Play, Sanaa Lathan
- Outstanding Featured Actress in a Play, Stephanie J. Block
- Outstanding Featured Actress in a Play, Kimberly Hebert Gregory
- Outstanding Director of a Play, Jo Bonney
- Outstanding Costume Design, ESosa

2012 Lucille Lortel Awards

- Outstanding Lead Actress, Sanaa Lathan (winner)
- Outstanding Costume Design, ESosa (winner)
- Outstanding Featured Actress, Kimberly Hébert Gregory (nominee)
- Outstanding Director, Jo Bonney (nominee)

2011 AUDELCO Award Nominations

- Lighting Design, Jeff Croiter
- Set Design, Neil Patel
- Costume Design, ESosa
- Sound Design, John Gromada
- Director/Dramatic Production, Jo Bonney
- Playwright, Lynn Nottage
- Supporting Actor, Daniel Breaker
- Supporting Actress, Kimberly Hebert Gregory
- Dramatic Production of the Year

2011 Audelco Award Winner

- Lead Actress, Sanaa Lathan
