= Intimate Apparel (play) =

2003 play by Lynn Nottage

- Original language: English
- Written by: Lynn Nottage
- Characters: Esther; Mrs. Dickson; Mrs. Van Buren; Mr. Marks; Mayme; George
- Setting: Lower Manhattan

Premiere
- Date: February 21, 2003
- Place: Center Stage, Baltimore

Intimate Apparel is a play written by Lynn Nottage. The play was originally a co-production and co-commission between Center Stage, Baltimore, Maryland, and South Coast Repertory, Costa Mesa, California. The play is set in New York City in 1905 and concerns a young African-American woman who traveled to New York to pursue her dreams, becoming an independent woman as a seamstress.

== Production history ==
The play had its world premiere at Center Stage (Baltimore, Maryland) running from February 21, 2003 to March 30. Directed by Kate Whoriskey, the cast featured Shane Williams (Esther), Brenda Pressley (Mrs. Dickson), Kevin Jackson (George Armstrong) Sue Cremin (Mrs. VanBuren) and Erica Gimpel (Mayme) . It next ran at the South Coast Repertory from April 11, 2003 through May 18, 2003 directed by Whoriskey and with the same Center Stage cast.

The play opened Off-Broadway at the Roundabout Theatre, running from March 17, 2004 to June 6, 2004. Directed by Daniel J. Sullivan, it featured Viola Davis (Esther), Lynda Gravatt (Mrs. Dickson), and Corey Stoll (Mr. Marks).

It has been produced at regional theaters, including the Mark Taper Forum in Los Angeles from July to September 2004, the Southern Repertory Theatre in New Orleans, the Steppenwolf Theatre Company in Chicago (January 2005), the Guthrie Theater in Minneapolis (Sept-Oct 2005), the City Theatre in Pittsburgh (May 2007), the Two River Theater in Red Bank, NJ (September/October 2010), the Artists Repertory Theatre in Portland, Oregon in September/October 2014, the New Jewish Theater in St. Louis, Missouri in January 2017, and Everyman Theatre in Baltimore, Maryland in October/November 2017.

The play had its UK premiere in July 2025, at the Donmar Warehouse, directed by former Artistic Director of the Bush Theatre, Lynette Linton.

== Plot ==
The time is 1905, the place New York City, where Esther, a black seamstress, lives in a boarding house for women and sews intimate apparel for clients who range from wealthy white patrons to black prostitutes. Her skills and discretion are much in demand, and she has managed to stuff a good sum of money into her quilt over the years. One by one, the other denizens of the boarding house marry and move away, but Esther remains, lonely and longing for a husband and a future. Her plan is to find the right man and use the money she's saved to open a beauty parlor where black women will be treated as royally as the white women she sews for. By way of a mutual acquaintance, she begins to receive beautiful letters from a lonesome Caribbean man named George Armstrong who is working on the Panama Canal. Being illiterate, Esther has one of her patrons respond to the letters, and over time the correspondence becomes increasingly intimate until George persuades her that they should marry, sight unseen. Meanwhile, Esther's heart seems to lie with the Hasidic shopkeeper from whom she buys fabric, and his heart with her, but the impossibility of the match is obvious to them both, and Esther consents to marry George. When George arrives in New York, however, he turns out not to be the man his letters painted him to be. He absconds with Esther's savings, frittering it away on prostitutes, liquor, and gambling. It is also revealed that he, too, can not read or write, and had paid a man in Panama to make him seem more appealing than he actually is. After discovering George had been spending money on one of Esther's prostitute clients, George leaves with the rest of Esther's savings. Deeply wounded by the betrayal, but somehow unbroken, Esther returns to the boarding house determined to use her gifted hands and her sewing machine to refashion her dreams and make them anew from the whole cloth of her life's experiences. The final stage directions hint that Esther is also pregnant.

The play is based on the life of Nottage's great-grandmother.

== Critical response ==
The CurtainUp reviewer of the 2004 production at the Mark Taper Forum wrote: "...the lyric and powerful expressive writing of playwright Lynn Nottage. She's an actor's gift with sly one-syllable humorous punch words; poetic paintings of physical and emotional landscapes; dramatic conflict that pulls no punches and is not afraid to make sympathetic characters unsympathetic; and an intimate knowledge of loneliness and passion."

The reviewer for The New York Times of a 2010 production at the Two River Theatre Company (Red Bank, New Jersey), wrote: "If you’ve seen Ms. Nottage’s 'Ruined,' about Congolese women in wartime,... no introduction is necessary. If you haven’t, you need only look at Ms. Nottage’s accumulation of other awards... to know that hers is a rare, vital, important theatrical voice. 'Intimate Apparel,' which had its Off Broadway run in 2004, is her best-known work... The Two River production, expertly directed by Seret Scott, shows off its multiple facets: a rich, vivid portrait of turn-of-the-last-century New York; a feminist lament of intelligent, talented women defined and controlled by men; a soft-focus glimpse into the beating hearts behind the archives of African-American life a century ago." It was listed among the 40 best plays ever written in The Independent.

== Awards and nominations ==
The play won the 2004 Steinberg New Play Award, presented by The American Theatre Critics Association to "outstanding new plays produced around the United States, outside of New York City".

Drama Desk Awards (2004)

- Outstanding Actress in a Play – Viola Davis (win, tie)
- Outstanding Featured Actor in a Play – Corey Stoll (nomination)

Outer Critics Circle Awards (2004)

- Outstanding Off-Broadway Play (win)
- John Gassner Award – Lynn Nottage (win)
- Outstanding Actress in a Play - Viola Davis (nomination)
- Outstanding Director of a Play (nomination)
- Outstanding Costume Design of a Play – Catherine Zuber (nomination)

Lucille Lortel Awards (2005)

- Outstanding Set Design – Derek McLane (win)
- Outstanding Costume Design – Catherine Zuber (win)
- Outstanding Play (nomination)
- Outstanding Director (nomination)
- Outstanding Lead Actress – Viola Davis (nomination)

Obie Award (2003–04)

- Performance - Viola Davis (win)
- Set Design - Derek McLane (win)

== Adaptation ==
An operatic adaptation of the play with a libretto by Lynn Nottage, music by Ricky Ian Gordon, and direction by Bartlett Sher began Off-Broadway previews February 27, 2020. The production was suspended before opening due to the COVID-19 pandemic. The production resumed previews in January 2022 before officially opening on January 31 of that year.
