= Laura Pedersen =

American author and playwright

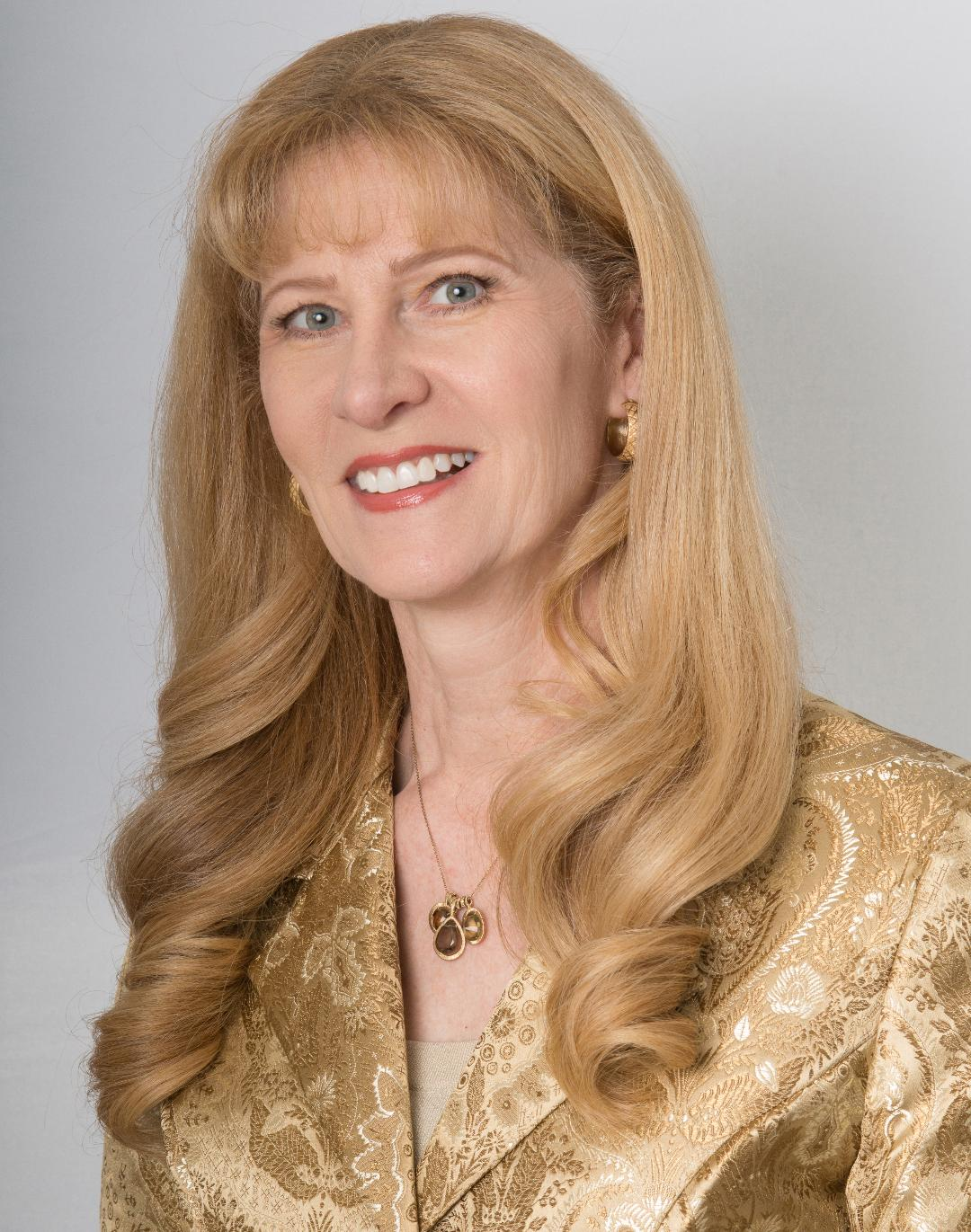
- Education: New York University Stern School of Business (BS)
- Occupations: Author; playwright; humorist
- Notable work: Beginner's Luck, Buffalo Gal, Life in New York
- Website: laurapedersenbooks.com

Laura Pedersen is an American author and playwright. She worked at the American Stock Exchange before writing her first book, Play Money.

== Early life and education ==
Pedersen is the only child of John and Ellen Pedersen. She grew up in Amherst, New York, and secured a 4-year BS degree in Finance at New York University's Stern School of Business in New York City in 1987. She worked as a clerk at the American Stock Exchange when she was 18, and had a seat on the exchange at age 20, at that time the youngest person to do so. She received an honorary doctorate degree from Canisius College in 2013.

== Career ==
In 1991 Pedersen and F. Peter Model wrote a book, Play Money, about her time at the American Stock Exchange. She was a columnist for The New York Times from 1995 to 2002. In 2001–2002 she hosted a finance show, Your Money & Your Life, on the Oxygen channel. She has authored numerous books in both fiction and non-fiction categories. Pedersen is currently the President of The Authors Guild Foundation.

== Works ==
=== Non-fiction books ===
- Play Money (1991)
- Buffalo Gal: A Memoir (2008) ISBN 1555916929
- Buffalo Unbound: A Celebration (2010) ISBN 1555917356
- Planes, Trains, And Auto-Rickshaws: A Journey Through Modern India (2012) ISBN 155591618X
- Life In New York: How I Learned To Love Squeegee Men, Token Suckers, Trash Twister, and Subway Sharks (2015) ISBN 1936218151
- A Theory of Everything Else: Essays (2020) ISBN 9781631527371
- It's Come to This: A Pandemic Diary (2021) ISBN 9781736736203

=== Fiction books ===
- Going Away Party (2001) ISBN 1586540106
- Beginner's Luck (Book One in The Hallie Palmer Series) (2003)
- Last Call (2003) ISBN 0345461916
- Heart's Desire (Book Two in The Hallie Palmer Series) (2005) ISBN 0345479556
- The Big Shuffle (Book Three in The Hallie Palmer Series) (2006) ISBN 0345479564
- Best Bet (Book Four in The Hallie Palmer Series) (2009) ISBN 1440170177
- Fool's Mate (2011) ISBN 1463652887

=== Short story ===
- The Sweetest Hours (2006) ISBN 1419616897

=== Children's books ===
- Unplugged: Ella Gets Her Family Back (2012) ISBN 9780884483373
- Ava's Adventure (2014) ISBN 9780884483885
- Wanda's Better Way (2017) ISBN 9781682750148
- Dana Digs In (2020) ISBN 9798638193270

=== Dramas ===
- For Heaven's Sake!
- A Dozen Perfect Moments
- Living Arrangements
- This Will All Be Yours
- The Brightness of Heaven
- Community Service
- Second Acts
- A Child's Christmas in Buffalo
- A Tale of Two Blizzards
