= Fabulation, or the Re-Education of Undine =

2004 play by Lynn Nottage

Fabulation, or the Re-Education of Undine is a play written by Lynn Nottage.

== Production history ==
Fabulation, or the Re-Education of Undine premiered Off-Broadway at Playwrights Horizons, running from June 3, 2004 (previews) June 13 (official) through July 11. Directed by Kate Whoriskey, the cast featured Charlayne Woodard as Undine.

In regional productions, the Center Stage, Baltimore, Maryland production ran from January 28 through March 8, 2009. Directed by Jackson Gay, the cast featured Natalie Venetia Belcon as Undine.

The play received its London premiere at the Tricycle Theatre in February 2006. Directed by Indhu Rubasingham, Jenny Jules starred in the role of Undine.

A revival of the play began performances at Signature Theatre on November 19, 2018.

== Plot ==
Undine is a successful African-American publicist living in Manhattan. When her husband takes her money, she is forced to return to her former life in Brooklyn, and to deal with her working-class relatives.

== Critical response ==
Ben Brantley, reviewing for The New York Times, wrote: "But while Fabulation may follow a much-traveled route to a guaranteed destination, the view along the way is far less predictable. In charting the social fall and moral rise of Undine Barnes Calles, nee Sharona Watkins, Fabulation subverts its comic and sentimental glibness with punchy social insights and the firecracker snap of unexpected humor."

The Curtain Up reviewer wrote: "Like [Edith] Wharton, Nottage casts a satirical eye on the large cast of characters, regardless of class or race. Unlike the more serious Wharton, [she] has created a generally hilarious scenario for Undine's nightmarish comeuppance and inevitable redemption as a likeable, lovable, loving member of the human race...The script has other credibility stretching holes—chief of them being her giving Hervé, the sexy Latin husband (Robert Montano) who tangoed his way into her heart and hearth, full access to all her money and becoming romantically involved with Guy, an ex-addict who's served time in jail."

The dramaturg for the Center Stage production, Faedra Chatard Carpenter (Assistant Professor, University of Maryland, College Park) noted: "...it not only becomes clear that Lynn Nottage is one of the modern masters of fabulation, but that her Undine story is paradigmatic of the form. Guided by a moral precept, Nottage’s play takes us on an unforgettable and layered journey of an all-too-human protagonist. Moreover, in taking the humor of her work seriously, our fabulous fabulator gives birth to an assortment of characters in a series of spectacular circumstances, gently reminding us all to laugh—and breathe—through the pain."

== Awards and nominations ==
2005 Obie Awards

- Playwrighting - Lynn Nottage
