= Lynn Nottage =

American playwright (born 1964)

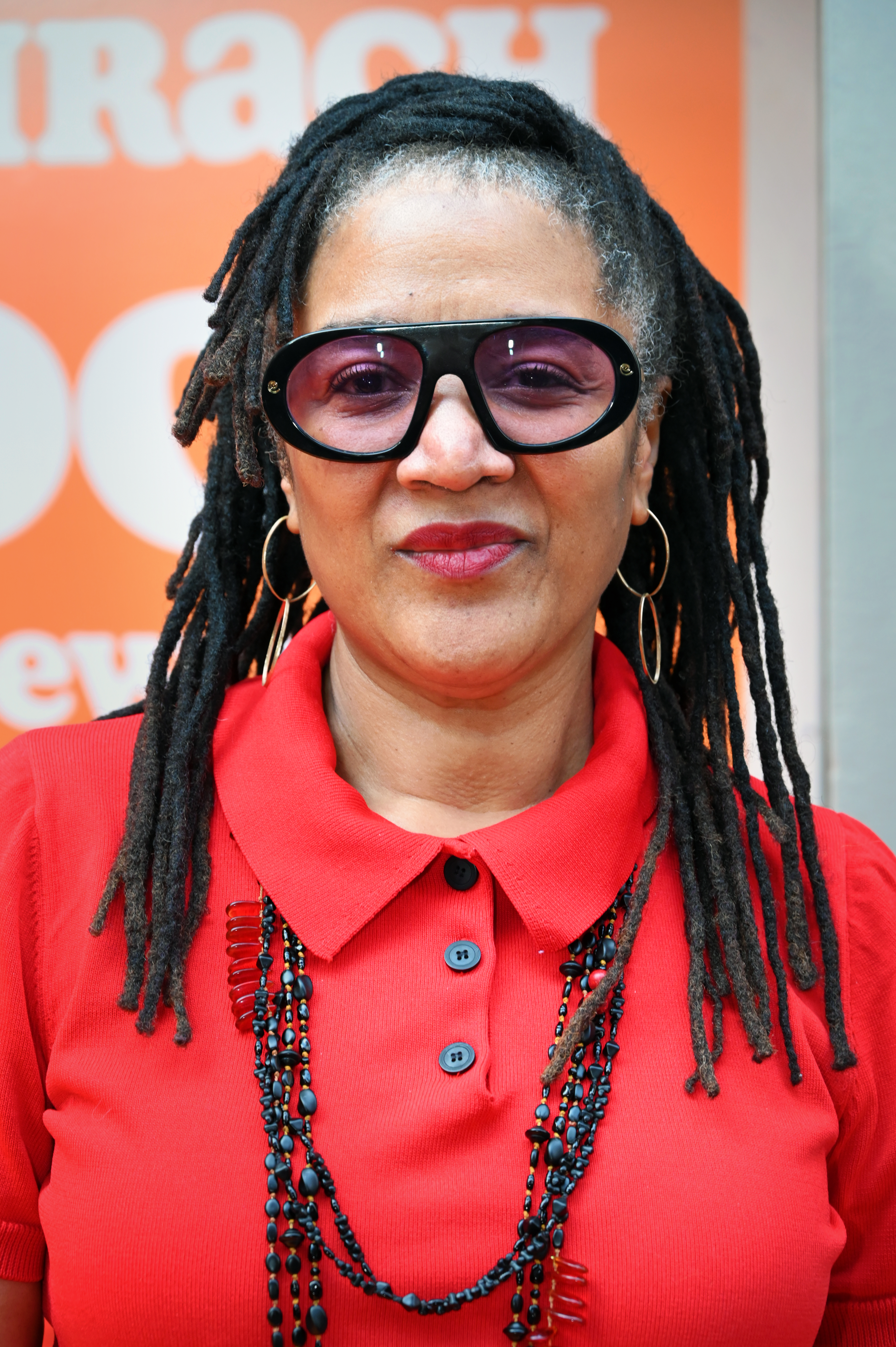
- Nottage in 2026
- Born: November 2, 1964 (age 61); Brooklyn, New York, U.S.
- Education: Brown University (AB); Yale University (MFA)
- Occupations: playwright; professor; screenwriter
- Spouse: Tony Gerber
- Children: 2
- Writing career
- Notable works: Crumbs from the Table of Joy (1995); Intimate Apparel (2003); Fabulation, or the Re-Education of Undine (2004); Ruined (2008); By the Way, Meet Vera Stark (2011); Sweat (2015); Clyde's (2021)
- Notable awards: Pulitzer Prize for Drama (2009, 2017); MacArthur Fellowship (2007); Susan Smith Blackburn Prize (2016); Obie Award (2005, 2009, 2017); PEN/Laura Pels Theater Award (2004, 2016)

Lynn Nottage (born November 2, 1964) is an American playwright whose work often focuses on the experience of working-class people, particularly those who are black. She has received the Pulitzer Prize for Drama twice: in 2009 for her play Ruined, and in 2017 for her play Sweat. She was the first (and remains the only) woman to have won the Pulitzer Prize for Drama twice.

Nottage is the recipient of a MacArthur "Genius" Fellowship and was included in Time magazine's 2019 list of the 100 Most Influential People. She is currently a professor of playwriting at Columbia University and an artist-in-residence at the Park Avenue Armory.

== Early and personal life ==
Lynn Nottage was born on November 2, 1964, in Brooklyn, New York. Her mother Ruby Nottage was a schoolteacher and principal; her father Wallace was a child psychologist. She has a younger brother, who became an attorney. She grew up in Brooklyn's Boerum Hill neighborhood, and attended Saint Ann's School for her elementary education, before graduating from Fiorello H. LaGuardia High School. While in high school, she wrote her first full-length play, The Darker Side of Verona, about an African-American Shakespeare company traveling through the South.

Nottage attended Brown University (A.B., 1986) and the Yale School of Drama (M.F.A., 1989). After graduation, she worked in Amnesty International's press office for four years. More recently, Nottage has received honorary degrees from Brown (D.F.A., 2011), the Juilliard School and Albright College.

Nottage is married to filmmaker Tony Gerber, with whom she has two children, Ruby Aiyo and Melkamu Gerber. After living in Manhattan at the start of her career, Nottage returned to Brooklyn in 1997, moving back to the same Boerum Hill house in which she was raised.

== Career ==
Nottage's plays have been produced widely in the United States and throughout the world.

=== Plays ===
==== Intimate Apparel ====
One of her best-known plays is Intimate Apparel.

In 1905 New York, Esther, a Black seamstress, lives in a boarding house for women, and sews intimate apparel for clients who range from wealthy white patrons to prostitutes. One by one, the other denizens of the boarding house marry and move away, but Esther remains, lonely and longing for a husband and a future. Her plan is to find the right man and use the money she's saved to open a beauty parlor where Black women will be treated as royally as the white women she sews for.

Co-commissioned and produced at Baltimore's Center Stage, it premiered in February 2003 and South Coast Repertory. The Off-Broadway production at Roundabout Theatre Company opened in 2004, starring Viola Davis, and receiving critical acclaim. It received the 2004 AUDELCO Viv Award for Playwriting; AUDELCO (Audience Development Committee) recognizes and honors excellence in Black theatre. Intimate Apparel has since been commissioned by the MET / Lincoln Center to be adapted into an opera, and will be composed by Ricky Ian Gordon.

Since 2004, Intimate Apparel has become one of the most produced plays in America.

==== Ruined ====
Ruined dramatizes the plight of Congolese women surviving civil war. Set in a small mining town in Democratic Republic of Congo, Ruined follows Mama Nadi, a shrewd businesswoman protecting and profiting from the women she shelters.The play deals with the role of women in war and the societal stigma around Female Genital Mutilation (FGM).

It premiered in 2007 in the Goodman Theatre (Chicago) New Stages Series, and transferred to Off-Broadway at the Manhattan Theatre Club in February 2009. Ruined was awarded the 2009 Pulitzer Prize for Drama. Ruined also received the 2009 AUDELCO Viv Award for Dramatic Production of the Year.

On May 13, 2009, Nottage spoke at a public reception in Washington, D.C. following a United States Senate Foreign Relations joint subcommittee hearing entitled "Confronting Rape and Other Forms of Violence Against Women in Conflict Zones," with case studies on the Democratic Republic of Congo and Sudan.

On October 12, 2009, Nottage spoke at the United Nations as part of the Exhibit CONGO/WOMEN Portraits of War: The Democratic Republic of Congo.

==== By the Way, Meet Vera Stark ====
By the Way, Meet Vera Stark is a narrative spanning seventy years, following the life of Vera Stark, a determined African-American maid and aspiring actress, and her complex relationship with her boss, a white Hollywood star struggling to maintain her career. When both women secure roles in the same Southern film, the behind-the-scenes story leaves Vera with a legacy that sparks both surprise and controversy.

It premiered Off-Broadway at Second Stage Theatre on May 9, 2011, with direction by Jo Bonney. The play is a "funny and irreverent look at racial stereotypes in Hollywood." The play was nominated for the 2012 Drama Desk Award, Outstanding Play. The play ran at the Geffen Playhouse in Los Angeles in September 2012, starring Sanaa Lathan, who played the role of the maid who becomes a stage star.

==== Sweat ====
Sweat tells the story of a group of friends who have spent their lives sharing drinks, secrets, and laughs while working together on the factory floor. But when layoffs and picket lines begin to chip away at their trust, the friends find themselves pitted against each other in a heart-wrenching fight to stay afloat.

Nottage received a commission from Oregon Shakespeare Festival and the Arena Stage. The play that she wrote as a result, Sweat, was presented at the festival in Ashland, Oregon, from July 29, 2015, to October 31, 2015, directed by Kate Whoriskey. The play takes place in Reading, Pennsylvania, and involves steel workers who have been locked out of their factory workplace. The play was produced at the Arena Stage (Washington, D.C.) from January 15 to February 21, 2016, directed by Whoriskey. Nottage won the 2015–16 Susan Smith Blackburn Prize for this play. Sweat premiered Off-Broadway at the Public Theater on October 18, 2016 (previews), officially on November 3, again directed by Whoriskey. Here, the play was awarded the 2017 Obie Award for Playwriting. The play closed on December 18, 2016. Sweat opened on Broadway at Studio 54 on March 4, 2017, in previews, officially on March 26. This marks Nottage's Broadway debut.

Sweat was a finalist for the 2016 Edward M. Kennedy Prize for Drama. Sweat was again a finalist for the 2017 Edward M. Kennedy Prize for Drama Inspired by American History. The award is administered by Columbia University. The play won the 2017 Pulitzer Prize for Drama.

==== Other plays ====
Her short play Poof! (Heideman Award) was presented in 1993 at the Actors Theatre of Louisville during the Humana Festival of New American Plays. It was then broadcast on PBS in 2002, with a cast that featured Rosie Perez and Viola Davis. Poof! was also recorded for podcast and public radio by Playing on Air, with a cast that featured Audra McDonald, Tonya Pinkins, and Keith Randolph Smith with direction by Seret Scott.

Her political satire Por'Knockers premiered in 1995 at the Vineyard Theatre, directed by Michael Rogers, featuring Sanaa Lathan.

The West Coast premiere of her Crumbs from the Table of Joy, at South Coast Repertory in September 1996, earned two NAACP Theatre Awards for performance.

Mud, River, Stone premiered in 1996 at The Acting Company directed by Seret Scott; it premiered in New York in 1997 at Playwrights Horizons, directed by Roger Rees. It was a finalist for the Susan Smith Blackburn Award, and won numerous regional theatre awards.

Las Meninas premiered in 2002 at San Jose Rep, directed by Michael Edwards. It was awarded a Rockefeller Grant, as well as the AT&T OnStage Award. It follows the true story of Queen Maria Theresa of Spain (wife of Louis XIV) and her affair with her African servant, Nabo, a dwarf from Dahomey.

Obie Award-winning Fabulation, or the Re-Education of Undine (her companion piece to Intimate Apparel, set one hundred years later), opened Off-Broadway at Playwrights Horizons in June 2004.

Her play Mlima's Tale premiered Off-Broadway at The Public Theater on March 27, 2018, in previews, officially on April 15 in a limited engagement to May 20. Direction was by Jo Bonney. The play concerns an elephant, Mlima, "trapped inside the clandestine international ivory market". Sahr Ngaujah plays Mlima. Mlima's Tale was nominated for the 2018 Outer Critics Circle Award for Outstanding New Off-Broadway Play, Outstanding Lighting Design (Play or Musical) (Lap Chi Chu) and Outstanding Sound Design (Play or Musical) (Darron L. West). The play was nominated for the 2019 Lucille Lortel Awards for Outstanding Play, Outstanding Director (Bonney), Outstanding Lead Actor in a Play (Sahr Ngaujah), Outstanding Costume Design (Jennifer Moeller) and Outstanding Lighting Design (Lap Chi Chu).

Nottage wrote the book for the world premiere musical adaptation of Sue Monk Kidd's novel The Secret Life of Bees, with music by Duncan Sheik and lyrics by Susan Birkenhead. It premiered at the Off-Broadway Atlantic Theater Company on May 12, 2019. The musical was directed by Sam Gold and featured Saycon Sengbloh as Rosaleen, Elizabeth Teeter as Lily, LaChanze, Eisa Davis and Anastacia McCleskey. The musical had a workshop at the Vassar Powerhouse Theater, Martel Theatre in July 2017, directed by Sam Gold.

=== Other work ===
Nottage wrote a monologue, The Grey Rooster, following a former slave and his slaveholder's cockfighting rooster in post-Civil War Kentucky. It was performed as part of the National Civil War Project's production Our War, produced in 2014 at Arena Stage, directed by Anita Maynard-Losh.

Nottage contributed to the "dance-theatre musical" written by Stephen Flaherty and Lynn Ahrens titled In Your Arms, which premiered at the Old Globe Theatre, San Diego, in September 2015. The piece consists of ten vignettes and was directed and choreographed by Christopher Gattelli. HNottage's vignette is titled A Wedding Dance and was performed by Marija Juliette Abney and Adesola Osakalumi with The Company.

Nottage wrote the book for a jukebox musical centered on Michael Jackson and titled MJ the Musical, originally aiming to premiere on Broadway in 2020; previews were delayed due to the COVID-19 pandemic, with the musical premiering in February 2022. MJ is currently running on Broadway, London's West End and is touring the United States. It is set to premiere in Sydney and in Hamburg in Spring 2025.

==== This is Reading ====
Nottage co-conceived This is Reading, an immersive transmedia project exploring the decline and rebirth of Reading, Pennsylvania: the setting of Nottage's play Sweat. This site-specific multimedia installation blended live performance and visual media, occupying the Franklin Street Railroad Station in Downtown Reading in May 2017, re-animating the long vacant building. Using as its foundation, the hardships, challenges, and triumphs of people living in and around Reading, This is Reading weaved individual stories into one cohesive tale of the city. It was produced in association with Market Road Films, the Labyrinth Theater Company, and Project&.

This Is Reading was conceived by Nottage, and co-created by an award-winning team of artists, including filmmaker Tony Gerber, director Kate Whoriskey and Choreographer Rennie Harris. The creative team included composer Kashaka, projection designer Jeff Sugg, set designer Deb O, costume designer Jennifer Moeller, lighting designer Amith Chandrashaker, sound designer Nick Kourtides, muralist Katie Merz and producers Jane M. Saks, Blake Ashman-Kipervaser, Allison Bressi and Santo D. Marabella.

==== Market Road Films ====
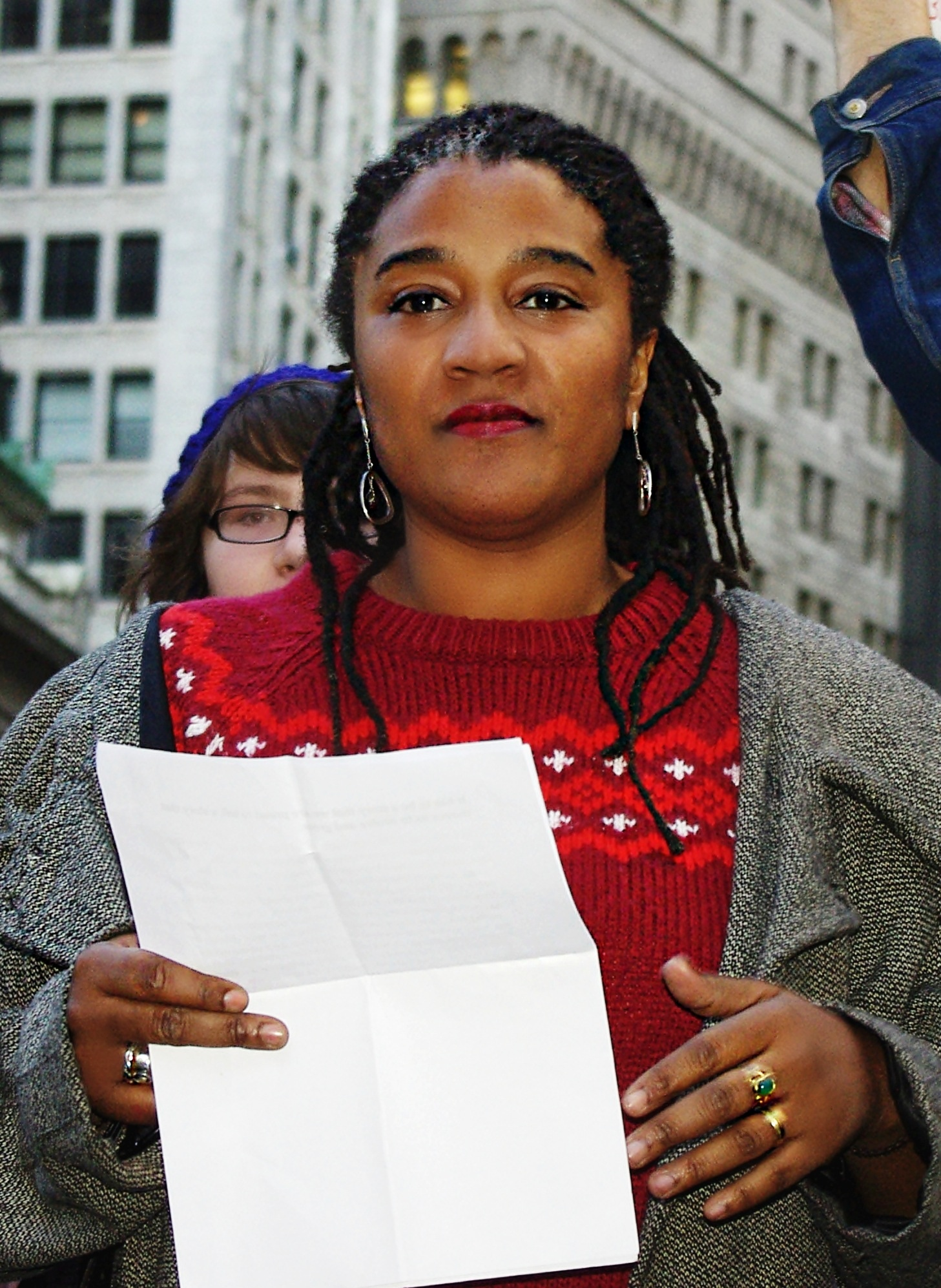
Nottage reading at Occupy Wall Street, November 2011

Nottage is the co-founder of a production company, Market Road Films, whose most recent projects include The Notorious Mr. Bout, directed by Tony Gerber and Maxim Pozdorovkin (Premiere/Sundance 2014); First to Fall, directed by Rachel Beth Anderson (Premiere/ IDFA, 2013); and Remote Control (Premiere/Busan 2013–New Currents Award).

Over the years, Nottage has developed original projects for HBO, Sidney Kimmel Entertainment, Showtime, This is That, and Harpo Productions.

==== Film and television ====
Nottage was a producer and writer for the first season of She's Gotta Have It.

== Themes ==
The Guardian noted:

"Nottage's two decades of work has garnered praise for bringing challenging and often forgotten, stories onto the stage. ... Ruined explored the use of rape as a weapon against women in the Democratic Republic of Congo, while Intimate Apparel focused on a lonely Black seamstress working in New York in 1905... Future areas the 51-year-old is keen to explore in her plays includes the American prison industrial complex, which is "destroying the lives of so many men of colour" but is barely talked about in the national conversation or on the stage. Yet Nottage also expressed disappointment that her work was constantly defined by both her own race and gender, unlike her white male counterparts."

== Works ==
=== Full-length plays ===
- Crumbs from the Table of Joy (1995)
- Por'Knockers (1995)
- Mud, River, Stone (1997)
- Las Meninas (2002)
- Intimate Apparel (2003)
- Fabulation, or the Re-Education of Undine (2004)
- Ruined (2008)
- By the Way, Meet Vera Stark (2011)
- Sweat (2015)
- One More River to Cross: A Verbatim Fugue (2015)
- Mlima's Tale (2018)
- Clyde's (2021) – originally debuted as Floyd's in 2019

=== Musicals ===
- The Secret Life of Bees (2019) – wrote book
- MJ the Musical (2021) – wrote book
- Imitation of Life (2026) – wrote book

=== Operas ===
- Intimate Apparel (2020) – wrote libretto
- This House (2025) – co-wrote libretto
- In the Rush (TBD) – co-wrote libretto

=== Other works ===
- Rhinestones and Paste (1989) – first play produced in New York
- Poof (1993) – short play
- A Walk Through Time (2000) – children's musical
- Snapshot (2002) – contributed material with 16 other playwrights
- Decade (2011) – contributed material with 19 other playwrights
- Our War (2014) – contributed material
- In Your Arms (2015) – contributed material
- This Is Reading (2017) – co-conceived / multimedia installation
- The Watering Hole (2021) – co-conceived and co-created
- Undersiege (2026) – co-curated with Dominique Morisseau, contributed material with 36 other playwrights
- Attestation (2026) – short play

== Awards and nominations ==
Awards

- 2025: Washington University International Humanities Medal
- 2023: Langston Hughes Medal
- 2022: Distinguished Achievement in the American Theatre Award
- 2019: Evening Standard Theatre Award for Best Play – Sweat
- 2017: Pulitzer Prize for Drama – Sweat
- 2017: Obie Award, Best New American Play – Sweat
- 2016: Susan Smith Blackburn Prize – Sweat
- 2009: Pulitzer Prize for Drama – Ruined
- 2009: Lucille Lortel Award for Outstanding Play – Ruined
- 2009: Drama Desk Award for Outstanding Play – Ruined
- 2009: Obie Award for Best New American Play - Ruined
- 2009: AUDELCO Viv Award for Dramatic Production of the Year – Ruined
- 2009: Outer Critics Circle Award for Outstanding New Off-Broadway Play – Ruined
- 2009: Drama Critics' Circle Award for Best Play – Ruined
- 2005: Obie Award, Best New American Play - Fabulation
- 2004: AUDELCO Viv Award for Playwriting – Intimate Apparel
- 2004: Drama Critics' Circle Award for Best Play – Intimate Apparel
- 2004: Outer Critics Circle Award, John Gassner Award – Intimate Apparel

Nominations

- 2022: Tony Award for Best Book of a Musical – MJ
- 2022: Tony Award for Best Play – Clyde's
- 2022: Drama Desk Award for Outstanding Lyrics – Intimate Apparel
- 2022: Drama Desk Award for Outstanding Book of a Musical – Intimate Apparel
- 2019: Lucille Lortel Award for Outstanding New Play – Mlima's Tale
- 2019: Lucille Lortel Award for Outstanding New Revival – Fabulation, or The Re-Education of Undine
- 2019: Drama Desk Award for Outstanding Revival – Fabulation, or The Re-Education of Undine
- 2019: Outer Critics Circle Award for Outstanding Revival – By the Way, Meet Vera Starke
- 2019: Laurence Olivier Award for Best New Play – Sweat
- 2019: South Bank Sky Arts Award for Theatre – Sweat
- 2018: Outer Critics Circle Award for Outstanding New Off-Broadway Play – Mlima's Tale
- 2017: Tony Award for Best Play – Sweat
- 2017: Drama Critics' Circle Award for Best Play – Sweat
- 2017: Drama Desk Award for Outstanding Play – Sweat
- 2017: AUDELCO Viv Award for Dramatic Production of the Year – Sweat
- 2017: AUDELCO Viv Award for Playwriting – Sweat
- 2012: Drama Desk Award for Outstanding Play – By the Way, Meet Vera Stark
- 2011: AUDELCO Viv Award for Playwriting – By the Way, Meet Vera Stark
- 2009: Susan Smith Blackburn Prize – Ruined
- 2005: Lucille Lortel Award for Outstanding Play – Intimate Apparel
- 2001: Susan Smith Blackburn Prize – Mud, River, Stone

Other awards

- 2019: Golden Plate Award of the American Academy of Achievement presented by Awards Council member Bartlett Sher
- 2018: Induction into the American Academy of Arts and Letters
- 2017: Induction into The American Academy of Arts and Science
- 2017: Award of Merit, American Academy of Arts and Letters to "an outstanding playwright for her body of work"
- 2017: AUDELCO Award for Outstanding Achievement
- 2017: Lucille Lortel Sidewalk Star
- 2016: PEN/Laura Pels "Master American Dramatist" Award
- 2016: Literature Award from The Academy of Arts and Letters
- 2016: Columbia University Provost Grant
- 2016: Doris Duke Artist Award, 2016
- 2013: Madge Evans-Sidney Kingsley Award
- 2012: Nelson A. Rockefeller Award For Creativity
- 2010: Steinberg "Distinguished Playwright" Award
- 2010: Horton Foote Award
- 2007: MacArthur "Genius Grant" Fellowship
- 2005: Guggenheim Foundation Fellowship for Drama and Performance Art
- 2004: PEN/Laura Pels "Mid-Career Playwright" Award
- 2000 & 1994: New York Foundation for the Arts Fellowship
- 1994: Van Lier Playwright Fellowship
- National Black Theatre Festival August Wilson Playwriting Award

Fellowships, commissions, and residencies

- Signature Theatre Company, 2018–2019 Residency One
- Park Avenue Armory (2017–2018)
- Arena Stage
- New Freedom Theatre
- New Dramatists (1999–2006)
