= Kristin Hanggi =

American filmmaker and theater director

Kristin Hanggi (born: Murrieta Valley, California) is an American film director, producer, and screenwriter; and theater director best known for the 2009 Broadway musical Rock of Ages. The jukebox musical received five Tony Award nominations, including a nomination for Best Direction of a Musical. She has also directed two national tours, and West End, Australia, Toronto, and Las Vegas productions.

== Personal life ==
Hanggi graduated with a master's in dramatic structure from the University of Southern California after receiving her bachelor's degree in Theater from the University of California, Los Angeles (UCLA). In June 2013, she returned to her alma mater when she received the UCLA School of Theater, Film, & Television Distinguished Alumni Award.

In 2012 she was living in Manhattan, New York City

== Career ==
=== Theater ===
Hanggi's stage productions include the Los Angeles and New York productions of Bare: A Pop Opera. Bare and Hanggi won the Ovation Award for Best Musical, LA Weekly Award for Best Musical, and Robby Award for Best Director. In January 2018, it was announced that she would adapt the musical into a feature film.

Other works include And the Curtain Rises at the Signature Theatre; Catch The Fish, winner of the New York's Fringe Festival; Twelfth Premise, a Los Angeles Times Critic's Pick; the Los Angeles premiere of Terrence McNally's Corpus Christi, winner of the Ticketholder Award for Best Production and Best Director, and Robby Award for Best Director of a Play; Crane, Mississippi, a Los Angeles Times and Backstage West Critic's Pick.

She also directed Pussycat Dolls Live at the Roxy, the 2002 production that launched The Pussycat Dolls girl group, with celebrities such as Christina Applegate, Carmen Electra, and special guests Gwen Stefani, Christina Aguilera, Brittany Murphy, Nikka Costa, and Charlize Theron.

Hanggi worked with Amy Heckerling to develop Heckerling's 1995 film Clueless into a stage musical which ran Off Broadway from November 2018 to January 2019, fulfilling its original 3-month booking.

=== Film and television ===
She made her feature directorial debut in 2014 with Grantham & Rose, starring Jake T. Austin and Marla Gibbs. Her follow-up film, Naomi and Ely's No Kiss List (2015), starring Victoria Justice, is an adaption of the Rachel Cohn and David Levithan novel of the same name.

Hanggi adapted and directed the children's book series, Dear Dumb Diary into a musical telefilm, with Jerry Zucker as executive producer.

== See also ==
- List of female film and television directors
- List of LGBT-related films directed by women
