= Gloria (play) =

Play by Branden Jacobs-Jenkins

- 2015 Off-Broadway premiere poster
- Written by: Branden Jacobs-Jenkins
- Characters: Gloria; Dean; Kendra; Miles; Ani; Lorin

Premiere
- Date: May 28, 2015
- Place: Vineyard Theatre, New York City

Gloria is a dramatic comedy written by playwright Branden Jacobs-Jenkins focusing on the lives of working Americans and dynamics in the workplace. The play made its debut Off-Broadway at the Vineyard Theatre in May 2015, after being developed by the same theatre. It was a finalist for the 2016 Pulitzer Prize for Drama.

== Plot ==
The play follows the ambitious assistants at a high-end Manhattan magazine. When no one attends the housewarming party for colleague Gloria, she begins feeling increasingly isolated from her co-workers, eventually shooting several managers at the office, leaving her colleagues with fear, confusion and survivor's guilt.

== Production history ==
=== 2015 Off-Broadway premiere ===
Gloria premiered Off-Broadway at the Vineyard Theatre on May 28, 2015 in preview, officially on June 17, directed by Evan Cabnet. The artistic directors were Douglas Aibel and Sarah Stern, and the executive producer was Jennifer Garvey-Blackwell. Set design was created by Takeshi Kata, costumes were designed by Ilona Somogyi, lighting was designed by Marr Frey, and the sound was designed by Matt Tierney. The play closed on July 18, 2015. A developmental workshop was held by the Vineyard Theatre in January 2013.

=== 2017 West End production ===
The play made its United Kingdom premiere in 2017 at London's Hampstead Theatre, running from June 15 to July 29, 2017. Directed by Michael Longhurst, the production starred Sian Clifford as Gloria/Nan, Colin Morgan as Dean/Devin, Bayo Gbadamosi as Miles/Others, Ellie Kendrick as Ani/Others, Kae Alexander as Kendra/Others, and Bo Poraj as Lorin. The production was nominated for a 2018 WhatsOnStage Award for Best New Play.

=== 2018 Melbourne production ===
Gloria received its Australian premiere at the Melbourne Theatre Company's Southbank Theatre, opening on June 21, 2018, after six previews. The play starred Lisa McCune as Gloria/Nan, Jordan Fraser-Trumble as Dean/Devin, Jane Harber as Ani/Others, Aileen Huynh as Kendra/Jenna, Callan Colley as Miles/Others and Peter Paltos as Lorin. The production was praised by Witness Performance as "careful and detailed" and "a slick and realised production."

=== 2019 Sydney production ===
It then enjoyed critical acclaim and a multi-extended season in Sydney, opening on June 6, 2019. The cast included Justin Amankwah, Annabel Harte, Reza Momenzada, Michelle Ny, Georgina Symes, and Rowan Witt, along with direction by Alexander Berlage.

=== 2027 Broadway production ===
Second Stage Theater announced on June 3, 2026 that they will be producing the play's Broadway premiere as part of their 2026-2027 season. Their production will once again be directed by Cabnet, and will begin performances at the Hayes Theater on March 17, 2027 ahead of an April 5 opening.

=== Additional productions ===
The Goodman Theatre produced the play, running from January 14, 2017 to February 19, 2017, directed by Evan Cabnet. In 2018, The Gamm Theatre of Warwick, Rhode Island produced Gloria, with performances running from November 21, 2018 through December 16, 2018. Gloria was also performed by BA Acting students at the Royal Conservatoire of Scotland from May 12, 2022 to May 14, 2022, directed by Monique Touko.

== Cast ==
Characters	Original Off-Broadway Cast	2017 Hampstead Theatre Cast	2018 Melbourne Cast	2019 Sydney Cast
Dean, Devin	Ryan Spahn	Colin Morgan	Jordan Fraser-Trumble	Rowan Witt
Kendra, Jenna	Jennifer Kim	Kae Alexander	Aileen Huynh	Michelle Ny
Ani, Sasha, Callie	Catherine Combs	Ellie Kendrick	Jane Harber	Annabel Harte
Gloria, Nan	Jeanine Serralles	Sian Clifford	Lisa McCune	Georgina Symes
Miles, Shawn, Rashaad	Kyle Beltran	Bayo Gbadamosi	Callan Colley	Justin Amankwah
Lorin	Michael Crane	Bo Poraj	Peter Paltos	Reza Momenzada

== Reviews ==
The New York Times pointed out how "whip-smart satire of fear and loathing in a beleaguered industry under siege," and, "the cannibal culture cycles that grip and warp Americans’ attention these days," are portrayed in the play. The "New York Theater" review also credits the play with "providing more illumination into the characters, and raising some intriguing questions, such as the ugliness of artistic ambition, the ways we individually and as a society process trauma, the exploitation and corruption inherent in our commercial culture." The Hollywood Reporter also recognizes Jacob-Jenkins himself, as he "handles his serious themes in a thoughtful, provocative manner."

== Awards and nominations ==
=== 2015 Off-Broadway production ===
Year	Award	Category	Nominee	Result	Ref.
2016	Pulitzer Prize for Drama		Branden Jacobs-Jenkins	Nominated	
2016	Drama Desk Awards	Outstanding Featured Actress in a Play	Jeanine Seralles	Nominated	
2016	Lucille Lortel Awards	Outstanding Play		Nominated	
2016	Lucille Lortel Awards	Outstanding Featured Actress in a Play	Jeanine Seralles	Nominated	
2016	Outer Critics Circle Awards	Outstanding New Broadway Play		Nominated	
2016	Outer Critics Circle Awards	Outstanding Director of a Play	Evan Cabnet	Nominated	
2016	Drama League Awards	Outstanding Production of a Play		Nominated	

=== Original London production ===
Year	Award	Category	Nominee	Result	Ref.
2017	Critics’ Circle Theatre Award	Most Promising Playwright	Branden Jacobs-Jenkins	Won	
2018	WhatsOnStage Awards	Best New Play		Nominated	
