= Ryan Spahn =

American actor, writer, director, and playwright

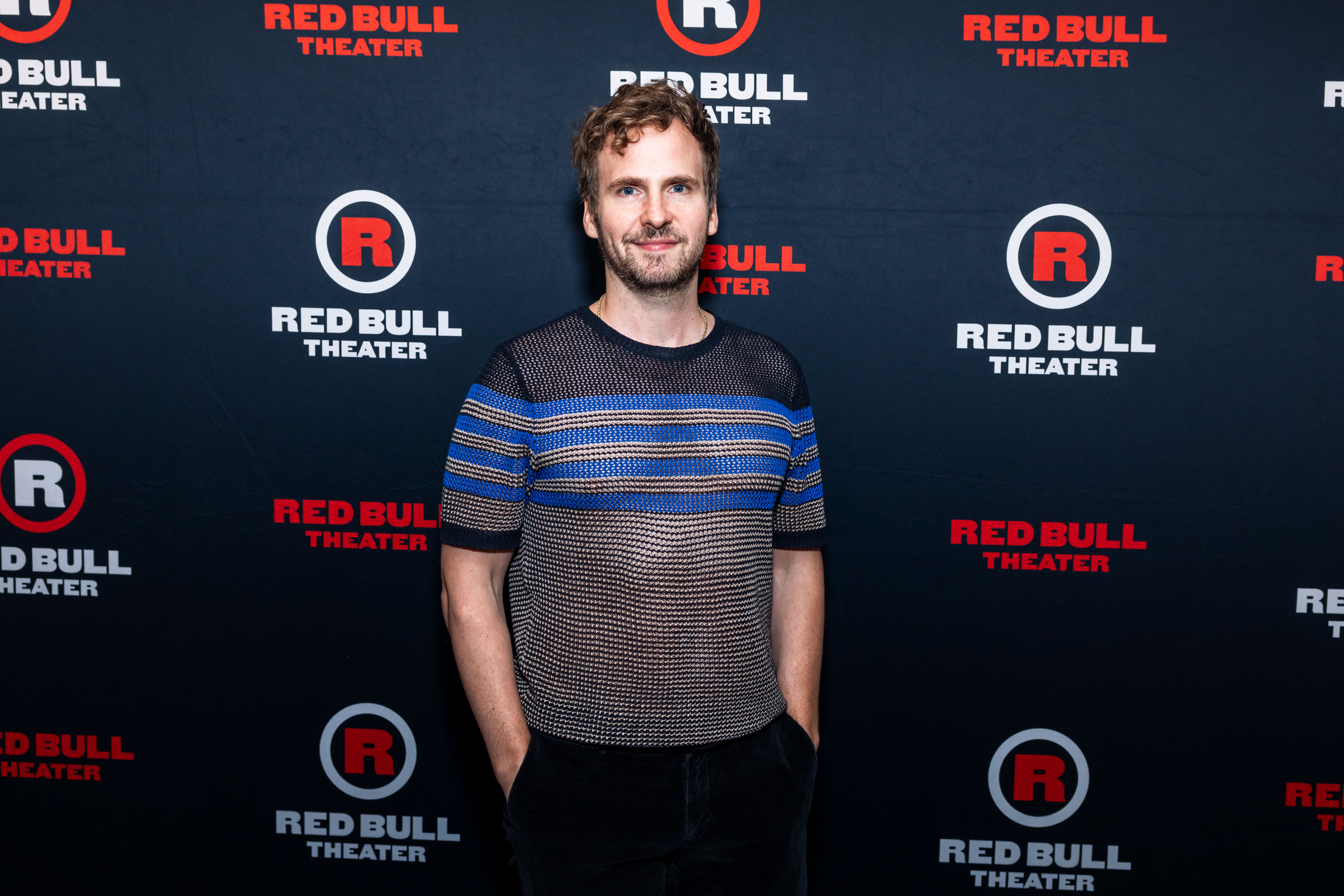
- Spahn in 2025
- Born: Ryan Christopher Spahn; June 18, 1980 (age 46); Wilmington, Delaware
- Education: Interlochen Arts Academy; Juilliard School
- Occupation: Actor
- Years active: 1998–present

Ryan Spahn is a Drama Desk Award–winning American actor, known for his Off-Broadway work including Branden Jacobs-Jenkins’ Gloria, a 2016 Pulitzer Prize finalist for Drama, and for writing the play Inspired By True Events (2024), which was part of the Obie Award–winning inaugural season of Out of the Box Theatrics.

== Early life and education ==
Spahn was born on June 18, 1980, grew up in Troy, Michigan, and attended Interlochen Arts Academy. He later earned a Bachelor of Fine Arts degree from the Juilliard School. Spahn is of Jewish, Irish, and Scottish descent.

== Career ==
Spahn began his on-screen career as a teenager on Star Trek: Voyager, portraying the Borg child "First" in the episode "Collective." He has also appeared in over twenty national commercials, including Snickers: "Get Dunked On by Patrick Ewing", Ratchet & Clank: Up Your Arsenal, Ford Focus, Levi's: "Make Them Your Own", and NY Lotto: "Fat Wallet".

As a filmmaker, he wrote and directed the feature film Nora Highland (2020), which premiered at NewFest, and was later distributed internationally by Revry.

Spahn has performed in original Off-Broadway casts that went on to receive nominations from the Lucille Lortel Awards, Drama Desk Awards, Drama League Awards, Outer Critics Circle Awards, Obie Awards, Off Broadway Alliance Awards, and the New York Drama Critics' Circle.

== Filmography ==
=== Theater / Stage ===
Year	Title	Venue / Company	Role / Notes	Ref
2026	An American Daughter	Pershing Square Signature Center / La Femme Theatre Productions (Off-Broadway)	Morrow McCarthy	
2025	Richard II	Red Bull Theater / Astor Place Theatre (Off-Broadway)	Bagot / Welsh Captain	
2025	Danger and Opportunity	East Village Basement (Off-Broadway)	Christian	
2024	The Antiquities	Playwrights Horizons (Off-Broadway) / Goodman Theatre	Man 4	
2024	Jordans	The Public Theater (Off-Broadway)	Ryan	
2023	Merry Me	New York Theatre Workshop (Off-Broadway)	Pvt. Willy Memnon	
2022	Good Enemy	Audible Theater at Minetta Lane (Off-Broadway)	White Boyfriend	
2022	Jane Anger	New Ohio Theatre (Off-Off-Broadway) / Shakespeare Theatre Company	Francis	
2020	Mr. Toole	59E59 Theaters (Off-Broadway)	John Kennedy Toole	
2020	How to Load a Musket	59E59 Theaters (Off-Broadway)	Ensemble	
2019	Moscow Moscow Moscow Moscow Moscow Moscow	MCC Theater (Off-Broadway) / Williamstown Theatre Festival	Kulygin	
2019	Still at Risk	Theatre for the New City (Off-Off-Broadway)	Byron	
2018	Hamlet	Shakespeare Theatre Company	Rozencrantz	
2018	Daniel's Husband	Westside Theatre / Primary Stages (Off-Broadway) / Penguin Rep Theatre	Daniel	
2018	Summer and Smoke	Classic Stage Company / Transport Group (Off-Broadway)	Archie Kramer	
2016	Exit Strategy	Primary Stages (Off-Broadway) / Philadelphia Theatre Company	Ricky	
2015	Gloria	Vineyard Theatre (Off-Broadway) / Goodman Theatre	Dean	
2014	Tribes	Actors Theatre of Louisville	Daniel	

=== Film ===
Year	Title	Role	Notes	Ref
2024	Parachute	Hudson	Feature film; premiered at SXSW Film Festival; directorial debut of Brittany Snow	
2020	Shirley	Drunk Cad	Feature film; premiered at Sundance Film Festival; directed by Josephine Decker	
2020	Nora Highland	Writer / Director	Feature film; premiered at NewFest	
2017	Woven	Wallace / Writer / Producer	Feature film; premiered at the LA Film Festival	
2014	Grantham & Rose	Erik Henry / Writer / Producer	Feature film; premiered at Cleveland International Film Festival	
2013	He's Way More Famous Than You	Ryan / Writer / Producer	Feature film; co-written by Halley Feiffer and directed by Michael Urie; premiered at Slamdance Film Festival	
1998	Polish Wedding	Kid	Feature film; directed by Theresa Connelly	

=== Television ===
Year	Title	Role	Network / Platform	Ref
2025	Sub/Liminal	Ben	Nebula	
2025	Zero Day	Leon	Netflix	
2024	Elsbeth	Danny Beck	CBS	
2023	American Horror Story: Delicate	Derek	FX	
2023	Succession	Coop	HBO	
2022	Chicago P.D.	Charlie Kalzenski	NBC	
2021	Modern Love	Billy	Amazon	
2021	The Bite	Joel	Spectrum Originals	
2019	The Blacklist	Roger Price	NBC	
2010	Ugly Betty	Gus	ABC	
2015–2017	Cocktails & Classics	Producer / Consulting Producer / Creative Consultant	Logo TV	
2015	What's Your Emergency	Sammy Halpern	Web series	
2004	Tanner on Tanner	Ryan	Sundance Channel; directed by Robert Altman	
2000	Star Trek: Voyager	Borg (teenage)	UPN	

=== Playwriting ===
- Inspired By True Events (2024) — premiered Off-Broadway via Out of the Box Theatrics; licensed and published by Concord Theatricals (formerly Samuel French). The play was developed in workshops with New York Stage and Film, Vineyard Theatre, and Ensemble Studio Theatre.
- Nora Highland — originally a stage piece later adapted into a film; was a finalist for the Eugene O’Neill National Playwrights Conference.
- Blessed and Highly Favored — developed in workshop settings at Ensemble Studio Theatre and Vineyard Playhouse.

== Awards and nominations ==
Year	Award	Category	Work	Result	Ref
2025	Drama Desk Award	Special Award	Danger and Opportunity	Won	
2025	Jeff Award	Ensemble	The Antiquities	Nominated	
2017	Time Out Chicago Theater Award	Best Supporting Performance	Gloria	Nominated	
2016	Barrymore Award	Outstanding Ensemble	Exit Strategy	Nominated	
2011	LA Weekly Theatre Awards	Best Comedy Ensemble	Stupid Kids	Winner	

=== Publications and essays ===
Spahn has written essays and commentary for American Theatre Magazine, Talkhouse, USA Today, and Metro Weekly.

He has maintained a decade-long correspondence and artistic friendship with playwright Adrienne Kennedy, which began after he performed in her work while at the Juilliard School. They wrote about their letter exchange in American Theatre Magazine in "The Landscape of Memory: Letters From Playwright Adrienne Kennedy".

His essays include:

- "Why I Keep Writing Letters to Adrienne Kennedy" (American Theatre Magazine)
- "How You Can Count on Me Brought My Family Back Together" (Talkhouse)
- "For Michael" (Talkhouse)
- "Opinion: 'Trump-Biden Voter Conversation'" (USA Today), on audio journalism and representation in political discourse.

== Personal life ==
Spahn lives between New York City and Los Angeles with his longtime partner, actor Michael Urie. He was previously in a relationship with actor Matt Dallas, discussed in his essay "For Michael." Spahn has also maintained a decades-long friendship with actor Tessa Thompson, whom he met early in his career.
