= Matthew Tierney =

Matthew or Matt Tierney may refer to:

- Matthew Tierney (poet) (born 1970), Canadian poet
- Sir Matthew John Tierney (1776–1845), Irish surgeon
- Matthew Tierney (Gaelic footballer) (fl. 2020s)
- Matt Tierney (rugby union) (born 1996), Canadian rugby union player
- Matt Tierney (sound designer) (fl. 2010s), sound designer for theater
