= Grantham & Rose =

- Film poster
- Directed by: Kristin Hanggi
- Written by: Ryan Spahn
- Produced by: Evangel Fung; Meghan-Michele German
- Starring: Jake T. Austin; Marla Gibbs; Tessa Thompson; Ryan Spahn
- Cinematography: Ryan Mitchel
- Edited by: Yaniv Dabach
- Music by: Jason Whitton
- Production companies: ClubNano Films; Ur-Mee Entertainment
- Distributed by: MarVista Entertainment
- Release date: March 23, 2014 (Cleveland International Film Festival)
- Running time: 90 minutes
- Country: United States
- Language: English

Grantham & Rose is a 2014 American independent coming of age drama film directed by Kristin Hanggi and written by Ryan Spahn and starring Jake T. Austin and Marla Gibbs. It is Hanggi's directorial debut. Michael Urie and Mark Lee served as an executive producers of the film.

== Plot ==
Grantham (Jake T. Austin) struggles to become a man when a spontaneous road trip places him in the care of an 81-year-old African-American woman named Rose (Marla Gibbs).

== Cast ==
- Jake T. Austin as Grantham Portnoy
- Marla Gibbs as Rose Price
- Tessa Thompson as Wallis
- Ryan Spahn as Erik Henry
- Lisa Winters II as Sherrie Portnoy

== Production ==
On August 2, 2012, it was announced that Gibbs would be cast opposite Austin in the film. Filming began in Georgia in August 2012.

== Release and reception ==
MarVista Entertainment released Grantham & Rose on February 10, 2015. The film premiered on Netflix on August 21, 2015.
