= An Octoroon =

2014 play, an adaptation of The Octoroon

- Original language: English
- Written by: Branden Jacobs-Jenkins
- Genre: Melodrama, Metatheatre
- Setting: A black box, and Louisiana

Premiere
- Date: 23 April 2014
- Place: Soho Rep; New York City, New York, United States

An Octoroon is a play written by Branden Jacobs-Jenkins. It is an adaptation of Dion Boucicault's The Octoroon, which premiered in 1859. Jacobs-Jenkins reframes Boucicault's play using its original characters and plot, speaking much of Boucicault's dialogue, and critiques its portrayal of race using Brechtian devices. Jacobs-Jenkins considers An Octoroon and his other works Appropriate and Neighbors linked in the exploration of theatre, genre, and how theatre interacts with questions of identity, along with how these questions (such as "Why do we think of a social issue as something that can be solved?") transform as a part of life. In a 2018 poll by critics from The New York Times, the work was ranked the second-greatest American play of the past 25 years.

== Characters and casting ==
Jacobs-Jenkins recommends the play be performed with 8 or 9 actors, with male characters played using blackface/whiteface/redface, and female characters portrayed by actresses that match the characters' race.

- BJJ – a black playwright who plays the characters:
  - George – the white heir to the Plantation Terrebonne, a photographer
  - M'Closky – an evil white overseer who plots to buy Terrebonne and Zoe
- Playwright – a characterization of The Octoroon's Caucasian author, Dion Boucicault who plays the roles of:
  - Wahnotee – an Indigenous American of ambiguous background, friends with Paul
  - Lafouche – an auctioneer
- Assistant – Playwright's intern, to be played by an actor of Indigenous American descent, who plays the roles of:
  - Pete – an older, loyal slave in charge of the house
  - Paul – a pickaninny-type young slave
- Zoe – the titular octoroon. She is the daughter of George's Uncle and a slave. Zoe grew up in the house, was educated, and has an affection for the slaves, who appreciate her
- Dora – a wealthy white woman who sets her eyes on George
- Minnie – a house slave
- Dido – a slave, friends with Minnie
- Grace – a pregnant slave
- Br'er Rabbit – a presentation of the Br'er Rabbit character. The actor playing Br'er Rabbit can also double as:
  - Captain Ratts – the owner of a ship that comes to buy slaves

== Plot ==
=== The Art of Dramatic Composition: A Prologue ===
The play begins with BJJ, in a black box telling the audience a conversation he and his therapist had, to get him excited about playwriting and to overcome depression. BJJ is focused on a play, The Octoroon, but runs into issues staging it because the white actors quit, so he applies whiteface in order to play them himself. Playwright taunts BJJ, and laments how theatre has changed since his death. Then Playwright and Assistant put on redface and blackface paint.

=== Act I ===
At the Plantation Terrebonne in Louisiana, Dido and Minnie chat about the arrival of George, and the passing of his uncle, their previous master. Pete, George, and Dora acquaint themselves when Zoe enters to meet George. M’Closky announces that Terrebonne is for sale and plots to steal Zoe; because she is an octoroon, she is a piece of property and therefore a part of the estate.

=== Act II ===
George photographs Dora with his camera while she and Zoe plot to make George marry her. Pete sends Paul to go find a letter that would promise enough money to save Terrebonne. Zoe and George are alone, and George confesses his love for her. Paul—with the mailbags—stops to take a photo of himself with George's camera. While posing, M’Closky comes from behind and kills Paul to take the letter.

=== Act III ===
Minnie and Dido realize all the other slaves ran away. Lafouche comes to run the auction of the property and announces Zoe will be sold. George proposes to Dora, but Zoe confesses their love, which turns off Dora. The auction begins and M’Closky aggressively bids on Zoe, winning her.

=== Act IV ===
BJJ stops the action of the play. BJJ, Playwright, and Assistant explain the significance of the fourth act, the sensation scene in melodrama. Wahnotee, accused by the members of Captain Ratts’ ship of killing Paul, is about to be lynched. George defends him and demands a fair trial, while M’Closky reluctantly takes the role of prosecution. Searching him, George finds the letter which resolves the conflict of Terrebonne's future. A plate from George's camera is presented, showing both Paul sitting, and M’Closky murdering him is presented and proves M'Closky's guilt. Pete pleads for M’Closky to not be lynched, so George demands that M'Closky be taken away, not revenged by Wahnotee, but M'Closky escapes and sets fire to the boat. Wahnotee murders M’Closky. Assistant announces that the boat explodes.

=== Act V ===
Zoe heads out to the slave quarters to ask Dido for poison. Zoe calls Dido Mammy, and she puts on a mammy character as they argue. Eventually, Zoe takes the poison and runs off. Minnie comforts Dido and they look forward to their new lives on Captain Ratts’ boat.

== Deconstructions ==
Through Brechtian elements such as direct address, Jacobs-Jenkins explores "the idea that you could feel something and then be aware that you're feeling it".

=== Melodrama ===
Jacobs-Jenkins researched Boucicault heavily while working on An Octoroon and found an unfinished essay at the New York Public Library saying that theatre is a place for dramatic illusion—the most believable illusion of suffering—and catharsis. Present in An Octoroon is the illusion of suffering and actual suffering.

Jacobs-Jenkins also cites Peter Brooks' The Melodramatic Imagination as an inspiration for his approach to melodrama. Brooks' idea is that melodrama is about binaries and opposites, where there is always good and bad with no gray area. This led Jacobs-Jenkins to see doubles and pairs in Boucicault's play, through relationships between characters e.g. Pete is Paul's grandfather. Boucicault portrayed Wahnotee, and in his play Jacobs-Jenkins explores the connection between a person and their identity as artist. Jacobs-Jenkins looks at the consequences of putting oneself onstage in their own work, if it is a real self or a fake self, which Jacobs-Jenkins embodied himself in the roles of Br'er Rabbit and Captain Ratts.

The sensation scene of the original play is deconstructed in act four. Following the act three climax: the plot lines must converge, the moral is made clear, and the audience has to be hit with a "theatre trick" which overwhelms the audience with technical elements. Rather than execute this, the actors explain and act out what happens. BJJ clarifies that in the time of the play, a photograph was a novel/innovative/contemporary way for the plot to be resolved. In An Octoroon, the projection of a "lynching photograph" is an attempt towards an actual experience of finality. A photograph of a real murdered human contrasts with the original play's use of a photograph for justice.

=== Stereotypes ===
By presenting characters in whiteface, blackface, and redface, Jacobs-Jenkins can look at "blackness and how to represent social constructs onstage that are so tied to a specific culture of nation." This examination of race as a social construct is also in Appropriate and Neighbors.

== Development and production history ==
Jacobs-Jenkins developed his take on The Octoroon while he was a Dorothy Strelsin Fellow at Soho Rep in the 2009/10 season.

An Octoroon had a workshop production at Performance Space 122 from June 19 – July 3, 2010, featuring Travis York, Karl Allen, Chris Manley, Ben Beckley, Gabe Levey, Jake Hart, Margaret Flanagan, Amber Gray, Mary Wiseman, LaToya Lewis, Kim Gainer, and Sasheer Zamata. It was originally directed by Gavin Quinn of the Irish theatre company Pan Pan, but Jacobs-Jenkins took over the role after Quinn quit several weeks into rehearsals. Prior to the first performance, Alexis Soloski for The Village Voice published an email from cast member Karl Allen who wrote, "the play has transformed from an engaging piece of contemporary theatre directed by Gavin Quinn to a piece of crap that wouldn't hold a candle to some of the community theater I did in high school". Vallejo Gantner, artistic director of PS 122 along with theatre critics Elisabeth Vincentelli and Adam Feldman, argued that although it was not unethical to publish the email, it may not have been "nice" to publish it.

Mark Ravenhill staged a workshop production of the play featuring Saycon Sengbloh in April 2012.

An Octoroon premiered Off-Broadway at Soho Rep on April 23, 2014 and closed on June 8. Directed by Sarah Benson, featuring music by César Alvarez (of The Lisps), choreography by David Neumann, set design by Mimi Lien, and lighting design by Matt Frey. The cast featured Chris Myers as BJJ, in triple roles: the black playwright, George Peyton and M'Closky; Danny Wolohan as Dion Boucicault, Zoë Winters as Dora, and Amber Gray as Zoe. Jacobs-Jenkins himself took on the role of Br'er Rabbit and Captain Ratts.

The production was critically acclaimed, winning an Obie Award for best new American play in 2014 (a tie with his previous play, Appropriate). In his review for The New York Times, Ben Brantley called the play "this decade's most eloquent theatrical statement on race in America today." The production transferred to Theatre for A New Audience's Polonsky Shakespeare Center in Brooklyn and ran from February 14, 2015 to March 29, 2015.

Nataki Garrett directed the first production of An Octoroon outside of New York with Mixed Blood Theatre Company in the fall of 2015.

Company One Theatre in Boston co-produced the play with ArtsEmerson, directed by Summer L. Williams. The production ran from January 29 to February 27, 2016.

The play was presented at the Wilma Theater in Philadelphia from March 16, 2016 to April 10, 2016, directed by Joanna Settle.

Dobama Theater in Cleveland Heights, Ohio presented An Octoroon from October 21, 2016 to November 13, 2016, directed by Nathan Motta

The first West Coast premiere of An Octoroon was held at the Berkeley Repertory Theatre, directed by Eric Ting with Sydney Morton in the title role. The limited season at Peet's Theatre ran from June 23 to July 29, 2017.

From May 18 to July 1, 2017 An Octoroon was performed at the Orange Tree Theatre in Richmond, London in a production directed by Ned Bennett and designed by Georgia Lowe. Subsequently the production transferred to the National Theatre from June 7 - July 18, 2018.

The Canadian premiere of An Octoroon was produced by The Shaw Festival for its 2017 season. The show was directed by Peter Hinton-Davis and designed by Gillian Gallow.

Artists Repertory Theatre, located in Portland, Oregon, was to stage An Octoroon from September 3 to October 1, 2017.

An Octoroon was staged by the Georgia Southern University Theatre & Performance Program from November 8 to November 15, 2017.

== Awards and nominations ==
=== Original London production ===
Year	Award	Category	Nominee	Result
2017	Critics’ Circle Theatre Award	Most Promising Playwright	Branden Jacobs-Jenkins	Won
