= New Zealand Town =

- Flight of the Conchords episode
- Episode no.: Season 2 Episode 8
- Directed by: Taika Waititi
- Written by: Taika Waititi
- Production code: 208
- Original air date: March 8, 2009

Guest appearances
- Lucy Lawless as Paula; Brian Sergent as the Prime Minister

Episode chronology
← Previous "Prime Minister"	Next → "Wingmen"

"New Zealand Town" is the eighth episode of the second season of the HBO comedy series Flight of the Conchords. This episode first aired in the United States on March 8, 2009.

== Plot synopsis ==
Trying to look cool for a gig at the Grand Opening of New York's one-block New Zealand enclave, the Conchords end up getting hooked on hair gel.

== Plot ==
Jemaine and Bret perform yet another gig to no audience. Specifically, the one person in attendance sneaks out only minutes into the show, and even Mel is not in attendance. This leads to Murray to call a band meeting to discuss the situation. Murray proposes that the band change their style by the use of hair gel. The issue is debated, but the band quickly embrace the change and demonstrate themselves in a series of bad hair dos. The crowds go wild, with the Conchords' new hair making them cool.

Meanwhile, Brian the Prime Minister of New Zealand continues his stay in New York City. With the help of Paula (Lucy Lawless) his new assistant and Murray they plan to spread the popularity of New Zealand with the creation of New Zealand Town, situated between Chinatown and Little Italy. But when Gary, New Zealand's most famous sheep, accidentally gets shorn, it's up to Jemaine and Bret to salvage New Zealand Town's grand opening. Unfortunately, they've run out of hair gel and, with only their natural charm and musical talent at their disposal, the Conchords end up driving away yet another audience.

== Songs ==
=== Fashion Is Danger ===
This musical number is a parody of the song and the music video for "Fade to Grey" by Visage. The song itself is a parody of "Fashion" and "Fame" by David Bowie. Jemaine and Bret wear uniforms from Babylon 5 and Crusade.

=== Other Songs ===
The episode's subplot makes various references to the Bus Driver's Song, which is featured in their Folk the World Tour CD and during live performances. Prime Minister Brian, who is incidentally shown driving the tour bus, has a love interest named Paula. An instrumental version of the song is played while the credits roll.

== Cultural references ==
At the end of the show, Murray tells the Prime Minister, "Forget it Brian, it's New Zealand Town." This is a reference to the closing lines of the movie Chinatown.

== Filming locations ==
The discussion on the street corner with Bret and Jemaine using hair gel takes place on the corner of Clinton St. and Henry St.

"New Zealand Town" was constructed at 200 Clinton St.
