= The Octoroon =

1859 play by Dion Boucicault

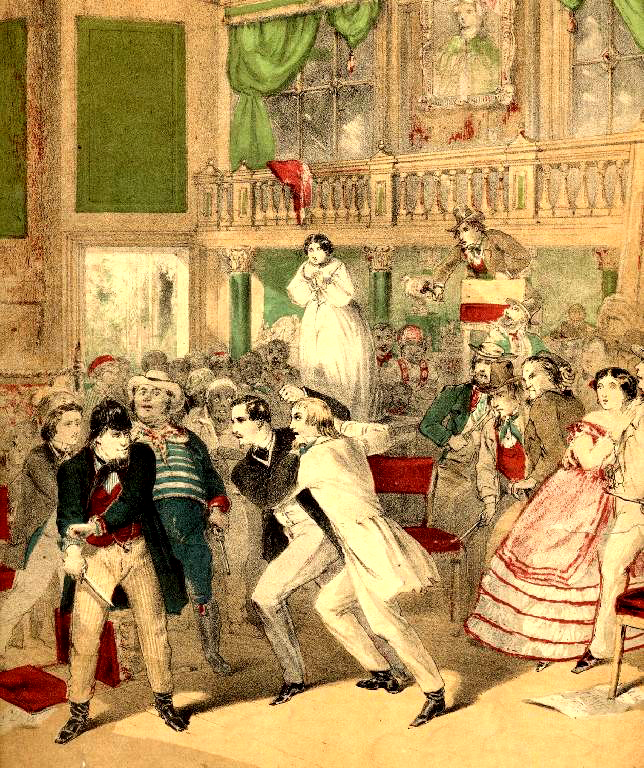
The Octoroon, Act IV, 1859 (print held by Special Collections, Templeman Library, University of Kent)

The Octoroon is a play by Dion Boucicault that opened in 1859 at The Winter Garden Theatre, New York City. Extremely popular, the play was kept running continuously for years by seven road companies. Among antebellum melodramas, it was considered second in popularity only to Uncle Tom's Cabin (1852). Both were anti-slavery works.

Boucicault adapted the play from the novel Quadroon (1856) by Thomas Mayne Reid. It explores the lives of free whites, and enslaved mixed-race and black Americans resident at a Louisiana plantation called Terrebonne. It sparked debates about the abolition of slavery and the role of theatre in politics. It contains elements of Romanticism and melodrama.

The word octoroon signifies a person of one-eighth African ancestry and typically seven-eighths white. In comparison, a quadroon would have one quarter African ancestry and a mulatto for the most part has historically implied half African ancestry.

The Oxford English Dictionary cites The Octoroon with the earliest record of the word "mashup" with the quote: "He don't understand; he speaks a mash up of Indian, French, and Mexican." Boucicault's manuscript actually reads "Indian, French and 'Merican." The last word, an important colloquialism, was misread by the typesetter of the play.

== Plot ==
=== Act I ===
George Peyton returns to the United States from a trip to France to find that the plantation he has inherited is in dire financial straits as a result of his late uncle's beneficence. Jacob McClosky, the man who ruined Judge Peyton, has come to inform George and his aunt (who was bequeathed a life interest in the estate) that their land will be sold and their slaves auctioned off separately. Salem Scudder, a kind Yankee, was Judge Peyton's business partner; though he wishes he could save Terrebonne, he has no money.

George is courted by the rich Southern belle heiress Dora Sunnyside, but he finds himself falling in love with Zoe, the mixed-race enslaved daughter of his uncle by one of the slaves. Dora, oblivious to George's lack of affection for her, enlists Zoe's help to win him over. McClosky desires Zoe for himself, and when she rejects his proposition, he plots to have her sold with the rest of the slaves. He knows that she is an octoroon and is legally part of the Terrebonne property. (Children born to enslaved women were considered slaves regardless of paternity or proportion of white ancestry.) He plans to buy Zoe and make her his concubine.

=== Act II ===
McClosky intercepts a young slave boy, Paul, who is bringing a mailbag to the house that contains a letter from one of Judge Peyton's old debtors. Since this letter would allow Mrs. Peyton to avoid selling Terrebonne, McClosky kills Paul and takes the letter. The murder is captured on Scudder's photographic apparatus. Paul's best friend, the Indian Wahnotee, discovers Paul's body; he can speak only poor English, however, and is unable to communicate the murder to anyone else.

George and Zoe reveal their love for each other, but Zoe rejects George's marriage proposal. When George asks why, Zoe explains that she is an octoroon, and the law prevents a white man from marrying anyone with the smallest black heritage. George offers to take her to a different country, but Zoe insists that she stay to help Terrebonne; Scudder appears and suggests that George marry Dora. With Dora's wealth, he explains, Terrebonne will not be sold and the slaves will not have to be separated. George reluctantly agrees.

=== Act III ===
George goes to Dora and begins to propose to her; while he is doing so, however, he has a change of heart and decides not to lie to her. He and Zoe admit their love; a heartbroken Dora leaves. The auctioneer arrives, along with prospective buyers, McClosky among them. After various slaves are auctioned off, George and the buyers are shocked to see Zoe up on the block.

McClosky has proved that Judge Peyton did not succeed in legally freeing her, as he had meant to do. Dora reappears and bids on Zoe – she has sold her own plantation in order to rescue Terrebonne. McClosky, however, outbids her for Zoe; George is restrained by his friends from attacking the man.

=== Act IV ===
The buyers gather to take away the slaves they have purchased on a steamship. They have realized that Paul is missing, and most believe him dead. Wahnotee appears, drunk and sorrowful, and tells them that Paul is buried near them. The men accuse Wahnotee of the murder, and McClosky calls for him to be lynched. Scudder insists that they hold a trial, and the men search for evidence. Just as McClosky points out the blood on Wahnotee's tomahawk, the oldest slave, Pete, arrives with the photographic plate that captured McClosky's deed. The men begin to call for McClosky to be lynched, but Scudder convinces them to send him to jail instead.

=== Act V ===
The men leave to fetch the authorities, but McClosky escapes. Stealing a lantern, he sets fire to the steamship filled with slaves. Wahnotee tracks him down and confronts him; in the ensuing struggle, Wahnotee kills McClosky. Back at Terrebonne, Zoe returns but with a sad heart, as she knows that she and George can never be together. In an act of desperation she drinks a vial of poison.

Scudder enters to deliver the good news that McClosky was proven guilty of murdering Paul and that Terrebonne now belongs to George. Despite this happiness, Zoe cannot be saved from the poison. She dies on the sitting-room couch with George kneeling beside her.

== Alternative endings ==
When the play was performed in England it was given a happy ending, in which Zoe and George were united. The tragic ending was used for American audiences, to avoid portraying a mixed marriage.

== Adaptations ==
The play was adapted by Branden Jacobs-Jenkins as An Octoroon in 2014.
