= Wingmen (Flight of the Conchords) =

- Flight of the Conchords episode
- Episode no.: Season 2 Episode 9
- Directed by: Troy Miller
- Production code: 209
- Original air date: March 15, 2009

Guest appearances
- Halley Feiffer (Savannah); Lenny Venito (John)

Episode chronology
← Previous "New Zealand Town"	Next → "Evicted"

"Wingmen" is the ninth episode of the second season and twenty first overall of the HBO comedy series Flight of the Conchords. This episode first aired in the United States on March 15, 2009. It is the penultimate episode of the second season.

== Plot synopsis ==
Bret enlists Jemaine and Dave to help him try to land a girlfriend. Murray regrets making Greg his scapegoat.

== Plot ==
Bret becomes attracted to Savannah, a woman who works in a pet shop. His shyness causes him to constantly buy goldfish from her while he builds up courage to ask her out.

Bret asks Jemaine to be his wingman and they borrow a headset from Dave's store so that Jemaine and Dave can feed him advice from a distance. He says it is an idea he got from a sitcom.

When that idea fails, Bret convinces Jemaine to pretend to mug Savannah, so he can save her and be seen positively in her eyes. It is another idea he got from a sitcom. Jemaine enlists the aid of his friend John, who mugged them in the third episode of season one.

Bret meets Savannah in the street and starts to walk her home. She ends up asking him out for dinner. Then, before Bret can stop them, Jemaine and John execute the pretend mugging plan. Due to force of habit, John actually does steal Savannah's purse, which leads to both him and Jemaine getting arrested. Jemaine is later released, and Savannah soon finds out that Bret faked the mugging and breaks up with him.

Meanwhile, Murray has unfairly made Greg the scapegoat for a mistake at work. He quickly regrets it and becomes convinced Greg is furious at him, despite Greg seeming perfectly calm about the situation. He spends the rest of the episode trying to patch up their friendship.

== Songs ==
=== Rambling Through the Avenues of Time ===
As Bret walks into the apartment, he picks up a guitar and launches into song about his day and the girl that he met and romanced. Jemaine adds humorous skeptical comments between Bret's lines. At the end of the song Bret admits that "95% of the song is made up", and that he invented most of it after simply noticing a girl at the local pet store.

The song is a parody of Peter Sarstedt's "Where Do You Go To (My Lovely)" and also of Billy Joel's "Piano Man".

=== I Told You I Was Freaky ===
In the lyrics of this song, Bret demonstrates to Savannah how "freaky" he can be sexually. It features several surreal scenes in which the lyrics are comically stretched to include rhymes ("I flip some clips on my lips, I clip some chips to your hips").

The song features bizarre backgrounds and costumes, in an attempt to seem freaky, including Bret in a vampire cape with fangs as well as Jemaine in a haz-mat.

This song is a parody of Beck's "Nicotine & Gravy" and "Debra".

== Filming location ==
The pet store where Savannah works is a real Petland Discounts store at 510 5th Avenue in Brooklyn.

== Cultural references ==
The ideas Bret says he got from sitcoms are plot devices that have featured in many TV shows including Friends, Curb Your Enthusiasm and Seinfeld.

At the start of the episode, Bret asks Jemaine if he would be his wingman, "like in Top Gun". Jemaine asked Bret to be his wingman in the season one episode "Girlfriends" and Bret also referenced Top Gun at that time. Later, Murray asks Jemaine to be his wingman when he attempts to apologise to Greg.

Dave references NeverNeverLand during another episode of confusion about the nationality of Bret and Jemaine.
