= Everybody (play) =

2017 play, an adaptation of Everyman

- Original language: English
- Written by: Branden Jacobs-Jenkins
- Genre: Morality play, Metatheatre

Premiere
- Date: February 21, 2017
- Place: Off-Broadway, Signature Theatre Company

Everybody is a play written by Branden Jacobs-Jenkins. It is a modern adaptation of the 15th-century morality play Everyman, one of the first recorded plays in the English language. The play premiered Off-Broadway at the Irene Diamond Stage at Signature Theatre Company on February 21, 2017, with previews beginning January 31, 2017 and a closing date of March 19, 2017. The play features the unique casting quirk of using a lottery system to define the roles of the play. Each actor must memorize the entire script and be prepared to play any role. This is meant to symbolize the randomness of death. The original production was directed by Lila Neugebauer and featured an ensemble of nine performers.

== Plot ==
The story is kept largely the same as Everyman with a few exceptions. Fellowship, Kindred, Goods, Discretion, Five Wits, and Knowledge are renamed Friendship, Kinship, Stuff, Mind, Five Senses, and Understanding respectively. Additionally, the scene where Everyman whips himself for Confession is changed to a scene where they are instructed by the drill sergeant-like character of Love to strip naked and scream "I have no control". Furthermore, instead of Good Deeds following Everyman/Everybody to the grave, that role is filled by Love. The story is also interspersed with pre-recorded voiceover scenes done fully in the dark, depicting four of Everybody's friends comforting them on their deathbed and through a misunderstanding eventually turns into a discussion about racism.

== Cast and characters ==
Character	Off-Broadway (2017)
Everybody; Friendship; Kinship; Cousin; Stuff; Evil; Strength; Beauty; Senses; Mind	Brooke Bloom; Michael Braun; Louis Cancelmi; David Patrick Kelly; Lakisha Michelle May
Death	Marylouise Burke
Usher; God; Understanding	Jocelyn Bioh
Love	Chris Perfetti
Time; Little Girl	Lilyana Tiare Cornell

== Reception ==
Ben Brantley of The New York Times gave the show a mediocre review, stating that the concept was interesting and it had value as an acting exercise, but claimed the show was "saying what is essentially the same thing again and again and again" and the pre-recorded sections felt like "unnecessary afterthoughts". Marilyn Stasio of Variety said "Something is inevitably lost in adapting the material for a modern audience that has outgrown its fear and awe of hellfire and damnation. But the story retains some power on a human level, and Jacobs-Jenkins plays up the randomness of death and the universality of the human condition by casting most of the major roles in this show by lottery at each performance."

== Awards and nominations ==
=== Original Off-Broadway production ===
Year	Award Ceremony	Category	Nominee	Result
2017	Lucille Lortel Awards	Outstanding Featured Actress in a Play	Jocelyn Bioh	Nominated
2017	Drama League Awards	Outstanding Production of a Play		Nominated
2018	Pulitzer Prize for Drama			Finalist
