= Evicted (Flight of the Conchords) =

- Flight of the Conchords episode
- Episode no.: Season 2 Episode 10
- Directed by: Taika Waititi
- Written by: James Bobin; Jemaine Clement; Bret McKenzie
- Production code: 210
- Original air date: March 22, 2009

Episode chronology
← Previous "Wingmen"	Next → —

"Evicted" is the final episode of the HBO comedy series Flight of the Conchords. This episode first aired in the United States on March 22, 2009.

== Plot ==
Bret and Jemaine are paid a visit by their landlord Eugene, who demands payment for the last two years of rent. Lacking the necessary funds and rejected by Murray and Dave, they find themselves with no choice but to move in with Mel and Doug.

Murray reveals he has been developing an off-broadway stage musical depicting the band's trials and tribulations and begins rehearsals, starring Bret and Jemaine as themselves. Doug offers to play the harp for the musical, but Mel rebuffs him, viewing harp-playing as a "feminine" endeavor. The ensuing argument leads Doug and Mel to separate and, like children from a broken home, Bret and Jemaine are forced to live with separate "parents": Jemaine with Doug, and Bret with Mel.

After their musical's opening night, the embassy members Murray invited become suspicious of the musical's frequent theme of illegal immigration. Bret and Jemaine are questioned and subsequently deported to New Zealand. Mel and Doug passionately reunite after Mel sees Doug gracefully playing the harp on stage. The final scene of the episode shows Bret and Jemaine returning to their jobs as shepherds at a farm somewhere near Mount Ruapehu, with Murray working the tractor.

== Songs ==
=== Everyday Sounds Musical Montage ===
At the start of the episode, Bret wakes up to the sound of his alarm clock ringing. He and Jemaine then use objects around the apartment to create music. Later that episode, they do the same thing with objects in New Zealand. The musical style is similar to Stomp.

The song they create sounds a lot like the break in "Bra" by the band Cymande, starting at 2:50 minutes.

=== Petrov, Yelyena, & Me ===
This song features Bret with Mel and Doug playing Yelyena and Petrov respectively. In the song, all three are stranded on a boat and are suffering from starvation, until Petrov and Yelyena secretly plan to eat Bret gradually overnight, starting with his leg, then his arm. Bret sees them eating bones and questions them about where his legs and arms have gone, and Petrov and Yelyena try to cover up their actions by saying that they're eating the fish. Eventually, Bret grows tired of being eaten and decides to ingest arsenic to poison his meat, despite being sick from doing so. In the end, Petrov and Yelyena die and Bret is left alive with just his head.

This version is noticeably faster and has fewer verses than the original recording on their live album Folk the World Tour, and Jemaine only played Petrov.

=== Flight of the Conchords: The Broadway Musical ===
When the Conchords are evicted from their apartment, Murray decides it is time to unleash his musical idea that follows the life of the Conchords. They eventually get a stage and perform a musical, singing songs about their life. The musical itself is like a montage, going through random scenes (the duo coming to America, Jemaine selling himself for sex, etc.). The art imitating life imitating art imitating life theme references the video for Björk's "Bachelorette".

== Reception ==
The episode received generally positive reviews.
