= Halley Feiffer =

American actress, playwright, TV writer and showrunner,

Halley Feiffer is an American actress, playwright and television writer, known for her award-winning plays I'm Gonna Pray for You So Hard, Moscow Moscow Moscow Moscow Moscow Moscow and A Funny Thing Happened on the Way to the Gynecologic Oncology Unit at Memorial Sloan Kettering Cancer Center of New York City, and for showrunning and writing the entire season of American Horror Story: Delicate starring Emma Roberts and Kim Kardashian.

== Early life and education ==
Feiffer was raised in a Jewish family, the daughter of famed satirist and cartoonist Jules Feiffer. She attended Wesleyan University and graduated in 2007.

== Career ==
=== Theater ===
Feiffer's work as a playwright has been produced off-Broadway at Playwrights Horizons, the Atlantic Theater Company, the Rattlestick Playwrights Theater, MCC Theater and the Cherry Lane Theatre, and regionally at Williamstown Theatre Festival and elsewhere.

Her first full-length play How to Make Friends and Then Kill Them premiered at the Rattlestick Playwrights Theater in October 2014, directed by Kip Fagan.

Her play I'm Gonna Pray For You So Hard, directed by Trip Cullman and starring Betty Gilpin and Reed Birney, broke box office records for the Atlantic Theater Company's Stage 2 space, was a Time Out New York Critics Pick, and was nominated for an Outer Critics Circle Award (the John Gassner Playwriting Award) in 2015. It had its UK premiere in March 2017 at the Finborough Theatre, London.

Her play A Funny Thing Happened on the Way to the Gynecologic Oncology Unit at Memorial Sloan Kettering Cancer Center of New York City, directed by Trip Cullman, won the Edgerton New Play Award before it premiered at MCC Theater in Spring 2016. The play starred Beth Behrs and Lisa Emery and was a New York Times Critic's Pick. It had its UK premiere in October 2018 at the Finborough Theatre, London. The Geffen Playhouse presented the West Coast premiere of the play in the fall as a part of their 2017–18 season in Los Angeles, which Feiffer also starred in.

Feiffer's world premiere of her new play, Moscow Moscow Moscow Moscow Moscow Moscow, a contemporary adaptation of Anton Chekhov’s Three Sisters, was part of the Williamstown Theatre Festival 2017 season. The production was directed by Trip Cullman, and starred Rebecca Henderson, Tavi Gevinson, Ryan Spahn, and Tony Award nominees Cristin Milioti, Thomas Sadoski and Micah Stock. The play received its New York premiere at MCC Theater in June 2019, and was nominated for a 2020 Drama Desk Award for Outstanding Adaptation and for a 2020 Drama League Award for Outstanding Production of a Play.

In March 2019, Playwrights Horizons premiered Feiffer's other new play The Pain of My Belligerence directed by Trip Cullman and featuring Feiffer in the lead role opposite Hamish Linklater, for which she was nominated for a 2020 Drama League Award for Distinguished Performance.

Feiffer won the National Young Playwrights' Contest in 2002 and the Lotos Foundation Award for Playwriting in 2015. Three of her plays have landed on The Kilroys' List.

Her plays have been produced, commissioned and developed by Manhattan Theater Club, Second Stage Theatre, New York Theatre Workshop, LAByrinth Theater Company, The Eugene O'Neill Theater Center, Cape Cod Theatre Project and elsewhere, and have been commissioned by Manhattan Theater Club, Williamstown Theatre Festival, the Alfred P. Sloan Foundation, Atlantic Theater Company and Playwrights Horizons. Her work is published by Dramatists Play Service, Overlook Press, Vintage Books, Applause Books, Samuel French and Smith & Kraus.

In addition to five full-length plays, she has written a variety of short plays. Thank You So Much for Stopping was included in a 2011 short play anthology. I Didn't Want a Mastodon was produced by Core Artist Ensemble at the Barrow Group Studio Theater in New York City from September 21–23, 2012, and was also performed by the Nuyorican Poets Cafe in New York City from April 11–13, 2014. Frank Amends was first produced at the New Ohio Theatre in New York City in October 2012.

She has performed off-Broadway in subUrbia, Election Day, None of the Above, Still Life, Some Americans Abroad, Tigers Be Still (for which she was nominated for a Drama League Award), Kenneth Lonergan's Medieval Play and Ethan Coen's Women or Nothing.

In April 2011, she made her Broadway debut in The House of Blue Leaves starring Ben Stiller, Edie Falco and Jennifer Jason Leigh, directed by David Cromer, for which she won a Theatre World Award. In Fall 2016, Feiffer starred in the Broadway revival of The Front Page starring Nathan Lane, John Slattery, John Goodman, Holland Taylor, Jefferson Mays, Sherie Rene Scott, and Robert Morse.

She was initially attached to write the book for the Broadway-bound musical adaptation of Thelma & Louise with music and lyrics by Neko Case, directed by Trip Cullman.

=== Television and film ===
As an actress, Feiffer's film credits include Kenneth Lonergan's You Can Count on Me, Stephanie Daley, Noah Baumbach's The Squid and the Whale and Margot at the Wedding, Oren Moverman's The Messenger, Jared Hess's Gentlemen Broncos, Jeff Lipsky's Twelve Thirty, Todd Haynes' HBO miniseries Mildred Pierce, Desiree Akhavan's Appropriate Behavior, and Sasha Gordon's "It Had to be You" opposite Cristin Milioti.

She also guest-starred on the HBO show Flight of the Conchords in the Season Two episode "Wingmen", and has guest-starred on Ugly Betty, The Good Wife, Law & Order, Torchwood and Royal Pains. She had a recurring role in the third and final season of Jonathan Ames' cult HBO series Bored to Death as Ted Danson's character's recovering alcoholic daughter Emily.

Additionally, Feiffer starred in the 2013 film He's Way More Famous Than You, directed by Michael Urie, which she co-wrote with Ryan Spahn and executive produced. She also co-created and stars with Ryan Spahn in the 2015 Stage17.tv web series What's Your Emergency?, the first season of which was directed by Urie.

In 2014, Feiffer became a writer for the Starz series The One Percent, co-created by Academy Award-winner Alejandro González Iñárritu, which was scheduled to begin filming in 2016 but was put into turnaround the following year.

Feiffer was a writer/producer for the Amazon Studios series Mozart in the Jungle. She was also a producer on the comedy series Kidding starring Jim Carrey for Showtime, a Supervising Producer on FX's Impeachment: American Crime Story for which she was nominated for a WGA Award, a Consulting Producer on the Apple TV+ series Roar (created by Carly Mensch and Liz Flahive), and a co-executive producer on the Apple TV+ series Dear Edward (created by Jason Katims).

She has developed her own shows with Apple, Hulu, Netflix, Amazon, Freeform, TNT and FX.

In April 2023 it was announced that Feiffer would take over for Ryan Murphy as the showrunner of American Horror Story, becoming the first showrunner other than Murphy of the long-running franchise and the first female showrunner of a Ryan Murphy Productions show. She wrote every episode of the show's twelfth season, American Horror Story: Delicate. In October 2024, it was announced that Feiffer would showrun a future season of the show.

In March 2025, it was announced that Feiffer had sold a show about crisis PR with A24 and actress Lizzy Caplan to Netflix in a competitive bidding war.

== Filmography ==
=== Film ===
Year	Title	Role	Notes
2000	You Can Count on Me	Amy	
2005	The Squid and the Whale	Sophie Greenberg	
2006	Stephanie Daley	Rhana	
2007	Margot at the Wedding	Maisy Koosman	
2009	The Messenger	Marla Cohen	
2009	Gentlemen Broncos	Tabatha	
2010	Fighting Fish	Chris	
2010	Twelve Thirty	Irena	
2012	Free Samples	Nancy	
2012	He's Way More Famous Than You	Halley Feiffer	Also writer
2013	All Is Bright	Claire, from last year	
2013	Clutter	Penny Bradford	
2014	Appropriate Behavior	Crystal	
2014	Glass Chin	Kathryn Glassman	
2015	It Had to Be You	Nora	

=== Television ===
Year	Title	Role	Notes
2001	Law & Order	Colleen Jacobs	Episode: "School Daze"
2009	Flight of the Conchords	Savannah	Episode: "Wingmen"
2010	The Good Wife	Irene Reagan	Episode: "Infamy"
2010	Ugly Betty	Allison	Episode: "Million Dollar Smile"
2011	Mildred Pierce	Arline	3 episodes
2011	Torchwood	Lianna	Episode: "Miracle Day: Rendition"
2011	Bored to Death	Emily	5 episodes
2012	Royal Pains	Nell Bochinski	Episode: "Dawn of the Med"
2014	Deadbeat	Brianne	Episode: "Calamityville Horror"
2014	Elementary	Erin Rabin	Episode: "Bella"
2015	Younger	Julie Burke	Episode: "Pilot"
2015	What's Your Emergency	Janice Featherstone	16 episodes
2016	Mozart in the Jungle	—N/a	Co-producer; 10 episodes
2017	Kidding	—N/a	Producer; 10 episodes
2020	Impeachment: American Crime Story	—N/a	Supervising producer 10 episodes
2022	Roar	—N/a	Consulting producer 8 episodes
2022	Dear Edward	—N/a	Co-executive producer 4 episodes
2023	American Horror Story: Delicate	—N/a	Executive producer Writer & showrunner (Season 12)
