= Checking In =

Television series

- Genre: Sitcom
- Created by: Mike Milligan; Jay Moriarty
- Directed by: Jack Shea
- Starring: Marla Gibbs; Patrick Collins; Larry Linville; Liz Torres; Ruth Brown; Robert Costanzo; Jordan Gibbs
- Country of origin: United States
- Original language: English
- No. of seasons: 1
- No. of episodes: 4

Production
- Running time: 30 minutes
- Production companies: T.A.T. Communications Company; Ragamuffin Productions

Original release
- Network: CBS
- Release: April 9 – April 30, 1981

Related
- The Jeffersons

Checking In is an American sitcom television series and a spin-off of The Jeffersons that aired for four episodes on CBS from April 9 to April 30, 1981.

== Synopsis ==
In the seventh season finale of The Jeffersons, "Florence's New Job", the Jeffersons' maid, Florence Johnston (Marla Gibbs), accepted a job to become the executive housekeeper at the fictional St. Frederick Hotel in New York City. The series follows Florence's misadventures at the hotel with her co-workers: Lyle Block, her stuffy manager; Elena Beltran, her assistant; Earl Bellamy, the inept house detective; Hank Sabatino, the lewd handyman; Betty, the floor supervisor; Dennis, the bellboy; and Mr. Claymore, the hotel owner.

== Cast ==
=== Main ===
- Marla Gibbs as Florence Johnston
- Larry Linville as Lyle Block
- Liz Torres as Elena Beltran
- Patrick Collins as Earl Bellamy
- Robert Costanzo as Hank Sabatino

=== Recurring ===
- Ruth Brown as Betty
- Jordan Gibbs as Dennis

== Episodes ==
No.	Title	Directed by	Written by	Original release date
1	"Boo Who?"	Jack Shea	Howard Bendetson & Bob Bendetson	April 9, 1981
Florence and Elena suspect that a ghost is roaming the building, and Florence decides to spend the night alone in a room to prove that it's not haunted.
2	"Block's Party"	Jack Shea	Bob Schiller & Bob Weiskopf	April 16, 1981
Lyle throws a party at the hotel, but his high school rival (now a pro football coach) and his team decide to crash it.
3	"Whose Side Are You On?"	Jack Shea	Michael G. Moye	April 23, 1981
Florence is caught between Lyle and Elena when they have an argument, but she won't take anyone's side.
4	"Florence and the Salesman"	Jack Shea	Lesa Kite, Cindy Begel, Howard Bendetson & Bob Bendetson	April 30, 1981
Florence misunderstands and thinks an elderly salesman is coming on to her, but he's really trying to make a sales pitch.

== Reception ==
Checking In premiered on CBS on April 9, 1981, and lasted for only four episodes in the Thursday, 8:00 p.m. ET timeslot. Faced with low ratings, the series was cancelled, and the final episode aired on April 30, 1981. Gibbs then returned to her regular role on The Jeffersons and it was explained that the St. Frederick Hotel had burned down.

Checking In was the first All in the Family spin-off series that was not successful, unlike The Jeffersons, Maude and Maude spin-off Good Times. Other failed spin-off attempts were Gloria in the 1982–1983 season and 704 Hauser in 1994.

== Home media ==
The third episode, "Whose Side Are You On?", was added as a bonus feature on The Jeffersons: The Complete Series 33-disc DVD set issued by Shout! Factory.
