= Marla Gibbs =

Actress, entertainer, singer, writer, and producer (born 1931)

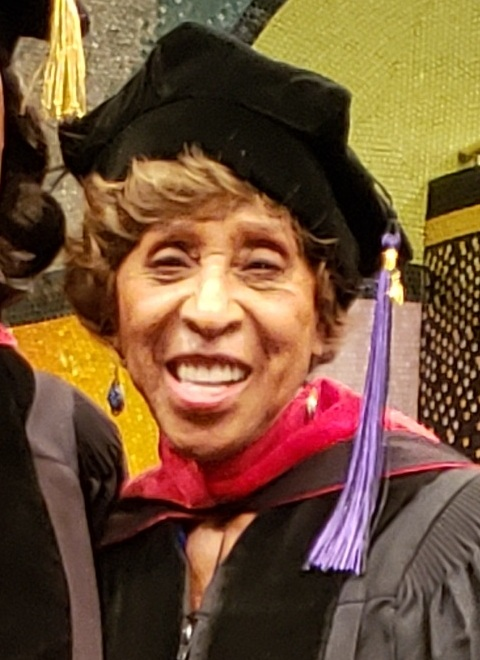
- Gibbs in 2019
- Born: Margaret Theresa Bradley; June 14, 1931 (age 95); Chicago, Illinois, U.S.
- Occupations: Actress; singer; comedian; writer; television producer
- Years active: 1973–present
- Known for: Florence Johnston – The Jeffersons; Mary Jenkins – 227
- Spouse: Jordan Gibbs (m. 1955; div. 1973)
- Children: 3, including Angela E. Gibbs
- Relatives: Susie Garrett (sister)

Marla Gibbs (born Margaret Theresa Bradley; June 14, 1931) is an American actress, singer, comedian, writer, and television producer whose career spans five decades. She is known for her role as George Jefferson's maid, Florence Johnston, on the CBS sitcom The Jeffersons (1975–1985), for which she received five nominations for the Primetime Emmy Award for Outstanding Supporting Actress in a Comedy Series.

Gibbs also starred on the show's spin-off Checking In (1981) and the NBC sitcom 227 (1985–1990); she co-produced the latter series, played the lead role of Mary Jenkins, and sang the theme song. Gibbs has won seven NAACP Image Awards. In later years, Gibbs played supporting roles in films The Meteor Man (1993), Lost & Found (1999), The Visit (2000), The Brothers (2001), Madea's Witness Protection (2012), Grantham & Rose (2015), and Lemon (2017) and on the Shondaland-produced TV shows Station 19 (2018) and Grey's Anatomy (2022). In August 2021, Gibbs began playing Olivia Price on the NBC daytime drama Days of Our Lives. She also played Sweet Gam Gam on The Thundermans.

Gibbs' autobiography It's Never Too Late: A Memoir was published on February 24, 2026.

== Early life and education ==
Marla Gibbs was born Margaret Theresa Bradley on June 14, 1931, in Chicago, Illinois, to Douglas Bradley, a self-taught mechanic, who also owned an ice company, and Ophelia Birdie Bradley (née Kemp), a business woman who also owned a theater, a hotel, and a boarding home haberdashery. She attended Corpus Christi Elementary School. After graduating from Corpus Christi in 1945, Gibbs attended St. Elizabeth High School, where she completed her freshman year and the first semester of her sophomore year. During the middle of her sophomore year, Gibbs transferred to Wendell Phillips Academy High School. When she was 16, her father died and Gibbs was sent to live with her mother and stepfather in Detroit where she attended Northern High School for a semester during her junior year. After months in Detroit, Gibbs returned to Chicago, re-enrolling at Phillips where she graduated in June 1949.

== Career ==
In 1963, Gibbs relocated to Los Angeles to recuperate from an ulcer and began working as a reservations agent for United Airlines. She first acted in local Los Angeles black theater before she got her first acting job in the early 1970s, in the blaxploitation films Sweet Jesus, Preacher Man and Black Belt Jones. She appeared uncredited in the 1974 CBS television drama Tell Me Where It Hurts as a nurse.

In 1975, she was cast in the CBS comedy series The Jeffersons as Florence Johnston, the family's maid. For the first two years with CBS, Gibbs continued working for United Airlines. She would work at CBS during the day and then leave for her second job, where she worked the night shift. When the series became an established success, CBS requested that she take a leave of absence from her United job. Gibbs's performance on the series garnered her five nominations for a Primetime Emmy Award for Outstanding Supporting Actress in a Comedy Series and one nomination for a Golden Globe Award for Best Supporting Actress – Series, Miniseries or Television Film.

In 1981, she starred in a short-lived spin-off of The Jeffersons titled Checking In. Gibbs responded in a 2015 interview on Broadway Showbiz, when asked if she'd based any of her characters on real-life people: "Yes, Florence was like my aunt and grandmother so I lived it. She came easy to me so I'm like Florence in giving smart answers, but I was also shy so I wouldn't have dared to say some of the things Florence said. I prefer to do whatever I can do at the moment. Whoever's hiring me at the moment...that's what I'm supposed to do. My favorite is drama. I'm doing that now (on Scandal), but also still doing comedy on Hot in Cleveland."

In 1985, after The Jeffersons was cancelled after 11 seasons, Gibbs became the lead actress in a new NBC sitcom, 227. 227 was adapted from a play directed by Cambridge Players' then-president Ed Cambridge and was presented to NBC by Cambridge at Gibbs's Crossroads Theater in Los Angeles, where he served as artistic director. The series aired until 1990, producing 116 episodes. Much like her character Mary Jenkins in the show, Gibbs also bestowed tough love to her co-star Regina King in real life. Gibbs said in a 2023 interview, about casting King as her daughter Brenda, "I fought for Regina [to be cast]. She had light brown hair and light eyes and she really looked like Hal," referring to Hal Williams, who played Mary's husband and Brenda's father. Gibbs said: "Regina went to regular school while she was on the show, and her friends would tell her the clothes her character wore made her look like a doofus. I had to tell her, ‘Now, look, do you want to be on TV? Or do you want to be with your friends, watching TV? You’re not dressing the way you want to dress; you’re dressing the way I make you dress. We can have an argument about it if you want to.’ She never forgot that." She also added: "Sometimes she’d come ask me if the clothes made her look too [young]. And I’d say, ‘I’ll tell you one thing: If you get too old, [the producers] are going to send your behind to college, and you won’t be on the show anymore! So be young as long as you can!’" Two decades later, Gibbs teamed with former 227 co-star Jackée Harry, in The First Family, where Gibbs had a recurring role as Grandma Eddy, the mother of Harry's character. She worked with Harry again in the independent film Forbidden Woman.

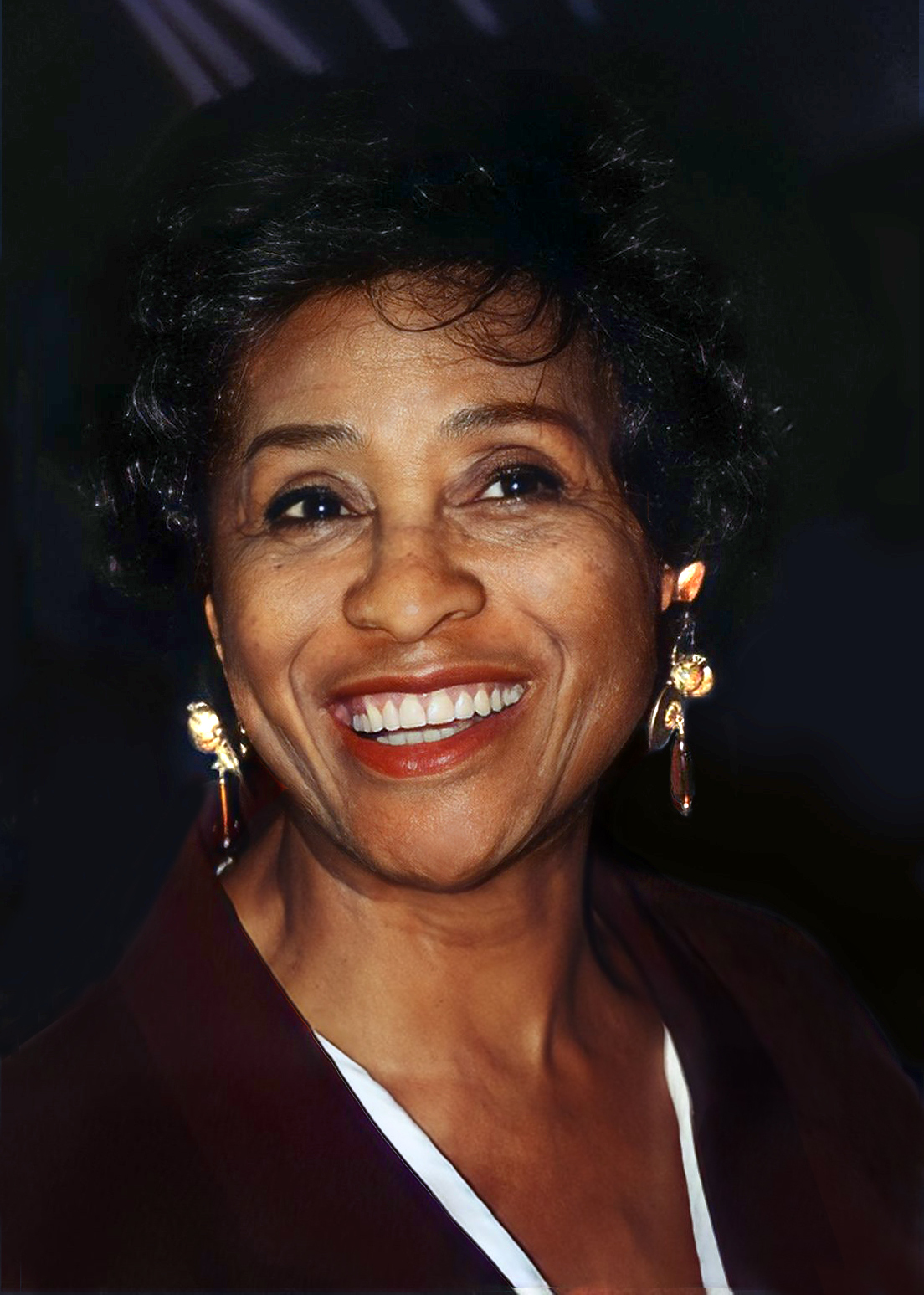
Gibbs at the NAACP convention in 2000

Gibbs had a number of supporting film roles. She also guest starred on The Fresh Prince of Bel-Air, Martin, Touched by an Angel (with Della Reese), Judging Amy, ER, and Southland. From 1998 - 2002 she had a recurring role on The Hughleys. Gibbs appeared in the 2012 Tyler Perry film Madea's Witness Protection, and starred in the 2012 independent film Grantham & Rose.

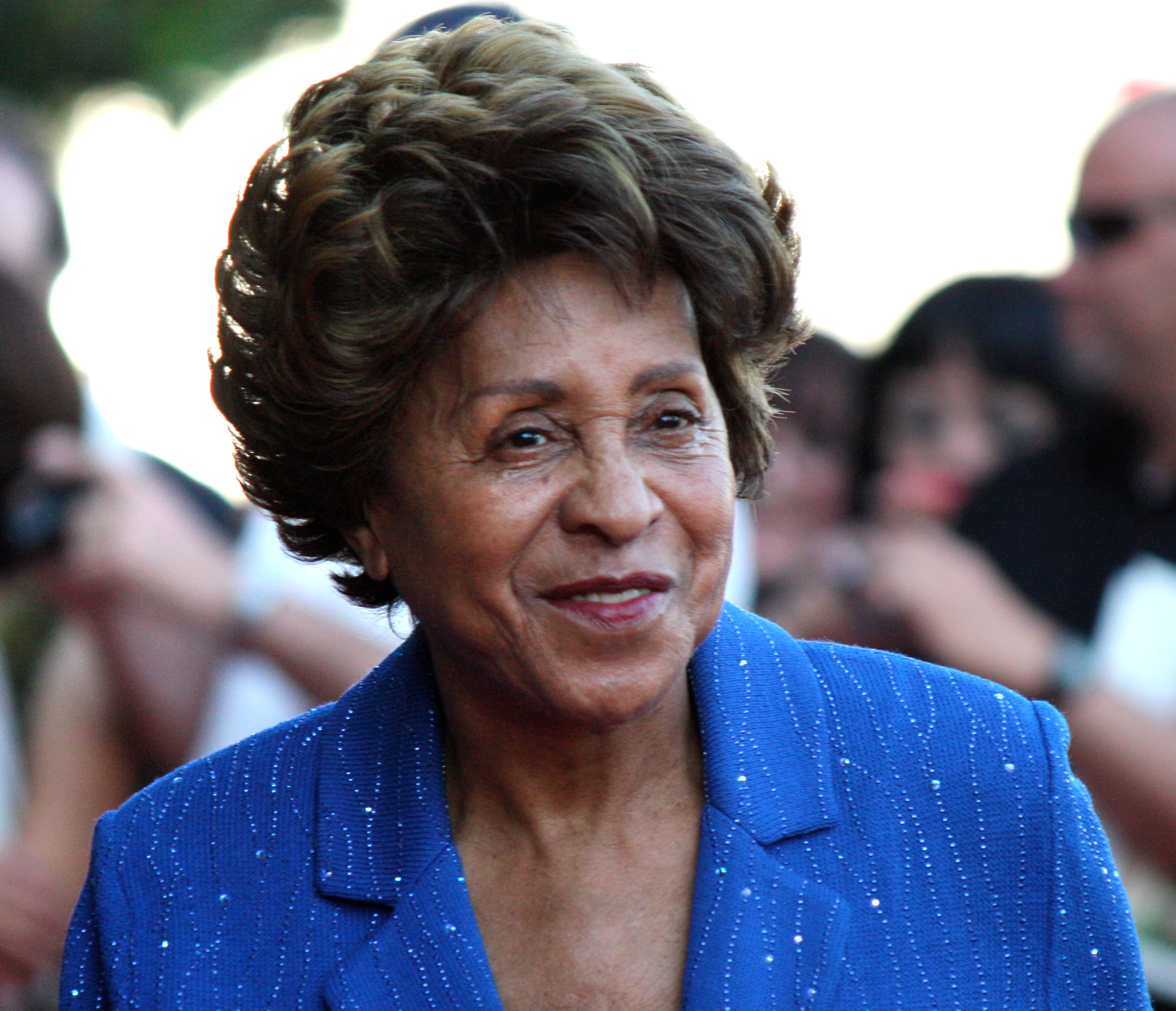
Gibbs in 2012

In 2015, Gibbs made two appearances in the Shonda Rhimes' drama series, Scandal. She later guest starred on Hot in Cleveland, American Horror Story: Hotel and This Is Us. In 2018, she was cast in a recurring role on the ABC drama series Station 19. Gibbs also had starring roles in two television pilots: Old Soul alongside Ellen Burstyn and Rita Moreno for NBC in 2014, and ABC's Jalen Vs. Everybody in 2017. In film, she co-starred in Lemon and Please Stand By.

In 2019, Gibbs reprised her role as Florence on Live in Front of a Studio Audience: Norman Lear's All in the Family and The Jeffersons, less than a month before her 88th birthday.

In 2021, Gibbs began appearing as Olivia Price in a recurring role on Days of Our Lives. That same year, for her contributions to the television industry, she was awarded a star on the Hollywood Walk of Fame.

In early 2025, Gibbs received the American Black Film Festival Legacy Award, alongside Giancarlo Esposito, Aaron Pierre, Keke Palmer and Aunjanue Ellis-Taylor, who was also among the honorees.

=== Other ventures ===
From 1981 to 1999, Gibbs owned a jazz club in South Central L.A. called Marla's Memory Lane Jazz and Supper Club. She released a number of albums as a singer. In 1990, she moved her Crossroads Arts Academy and Theatre into the former Leimert Theatre in Los Angeles. Plans included the construction of a second stage, but the project ended in debt in June 1997.

== Personal life ==
Gibbs was married to her high school sweetheart Jordan Gibbs from 1955 to 1973 and the couple had three children.

On July 31, 2014, Gibbs attended the Leimert Park Village Book Fair in Los Angeles to pay tribute to Maya Angelou, who died on May 28, and Ruby Dee, who died on June 11. On January 11, 2016, Gibbs and former 227 co-star Jackée Harry attended the funeral of Grammy Award–winning singer Natalie Cole at the West Angeles Church of God in Christ in Los Angeles. Gibbs co-starred opposite Cole in the television film Lily in Winter.

On November 13, 2024, Gibbs appeared at the Wilmington Library in Wilmington, Delaware, for A Conversation with Marla Gibbs, where she reminisced an almost 50-year career in television, delivering stories about her private life, both on-screen and off, especially that of her longtime friendship with Sherman Hemsley, who died in July 2012 and played her TV boss on The Jeffersons.

== Filmography ==
=== Film ===
Key
†	Denotes films that have not yet been released

Year	Title	Role	Notes
1968	Yours, Mine and Ours	Movie Patron	Uncredited
1973	Sweet Jesus, Preacherman	Beverly Solomon	
1974	Black Belt Jones	Betty	Uncredited
1977	Passing Through	Secretary	
1991	Up Against the Wall	Louise Bradley	
1991	Last Breeze of Summer	Mary	Short film
1993	The Meteor Man	Maxine Reed	
1998	Border to Border	Dela	
1999	Foolish	Odetta	
1999	Lost & Found	Enid	
2000	The Visit	Lois Waters	Method Fest Independent Film Festival Award for Best Supporting Actress; Nominated — NAACP Image Award for Outstanding Supporting Actress in a Motion Picture; Nominated — Black Reel Award for Best Supporting Actress
2000	Stanley's Gig	Eleanor Whitney	
2001	The Brothers	Mary West	
2005	Love on Layaway	Narrator	
2006	The Ties That Bind	Delores	Short film
2006	The Heart Specialist	Mrs. Underwood	
2009	The What Goes Around	Ms. Lacey	Short film
2009	Afro Ninja	Aunt Mary	
2009	Just Like Family	Mabel Jenkins	
2009	Devil's Land	Judge Martha M. Levine	
2010	Sunnyview	Mrs. Harris	Short film
2012	Who Killed Soul Glow?	Nadine	
2012	C'mon Man	Mrs. Crabtree	
2012	Madea's Witness Protection	Hattie	
2013	Forbidden Woman	Mrs. Simmons	
2014	Grantham & Rose	Rose Price	
2015	The Man in 3B	Ms. Mamie	
2016	Second Sight	Nana	
2017	Lemon	Lilly	
2017	The Last Revolutionary	Millie	
2017	You Can't Fight Christmas	Beverly Lawrence	
2018	Please Stand By	Rose	
2018	Love Jacked	Rose	
2019	El Camino: A Breaking Bad Movie	Jean	
2020	She Ball	Mrs. Watts	
2021	Alone Together	Anna	Short film
2022	Bromates	Grandma Gladys	
2022	Spirit Halloween: The Movie	Grandma G	
2023	A Snowy Day in Oakland	Mrs. Keys	

=== Television ===
Year	Title	Role	Notes
1975–1985	The Jeffersons	Florence Johnston	Series regular, 207 episodes NAACP Image Award for Outstanding Supporting Actress in a Comedy Series; Nominated — Primetime Emmy Award for Outstanding Supporting Actress in a Comedy Series (1981-1985); Nominated — Golden Globe Award for Best Supporting Actress – Series, Miniseries or Television Film (1985); Nominated — TV Land Award for Favorite Made-for-TV Maid
1975	Barney Miller	Mrs. McBee	Episode: "Vigilante"
1975	The Missing Are Deadly	Nurse	Television film
1976	Arthur Hailey's The Moneychangers	Beth Euphrates	Miniseries
1979	You Can't Take It with You	Rheba	Television film
1981	Checking In	Florence Johnston	Series regular, 4 episodes
1981	The Love Boat	Janet Dalton	Episode: "The Incredible Hunk/Isaac, the Marriage Counselor/Jewels & Jim"
1983	The Young Landlords	Tina Robinson	Television film
1984	Pryor's Place	Miss Stern	Episodes: "Voyage to the Planet of the Dumb", "Sax Education" and "The Showoff"
1985–1990	227	Mary Jenkins	Series regular, 115 episodes
1990	Menu for Murder	Marty Hallard	Television film
1993	A Different World	Principal Shaw	Episode: "To Whit, with Love"
1993	In the Heat of the Night	Lilly Baker	Episode: "A Baby Called Rocket"
1993	Empty Nest	Josephine Douglas	Episode: "Mother Dearest"
1994	Lily in Winter	Maize Covington	Television film
1995	Dream On	Mrs. Perry	Episode: "Little Orphan Eddie"
1995	Burke's Law	Jessica Wallace	Episode: "Who Killed the Hollywood Headshrinker?"
1995	Martin	Miss Minnie	Episode: "Housekeeper from Hell"; Nominated — NAACP Image Award for Outstanding Supporting Actress in a Comedy Series
1996	The Fresh Prince of Bel-Air	Florence Johnston	Episode: "I, Done: Part 2"
1997	Mother Goose: A Rappin' and Rhymin' Special	Old Mother Hubbard (voice)	Television film
1997–1998	101 Dalmatians: The Series	Duchess (voice)	Supporting role, 9 episodes
1997; 1999	Happily Ever After: Fairy Tales for Every Child	Old Mother Hubbard / Grandmother (voice)	Episodes: "Mother Goose" and "Ali Baba and the Forty Thieves"
1998–2002	The Hughleys	Hattie Mae Hughley	Recurring role, 16 episodes
1999	Martial Law	Dolores Parker / Dolores Samuels	Episodes: "Wild Life" and "Big Trouble"
1999	Dawson's Creek	Mrs. Fran Boyd	Episode: "First Encounters of the Close Kind"
2000	Touched by an Angel	Millie	Episode: "The Invitation"; Nominated — NAACP Image Award for Outstanding Supporting Actress in a Drama Series
2001	Judging Amy	Zella Van Exel	Episode: "Between the Wanting and the Getting"
2002	The King of Queens	Nana Louise	Episode: "Patrons Ain't"
2002	The Rerun Show	Dr. Beamish	Episode: "The Facts of Life: Shoplifting/The Jeffersons: A Bedtime Story"
2002	Arli$$	Mrs. Jones	Episode: "Profiles in Agenting"
2004	Listen Up	Jackie Widmer	Episode: "Thanksgiving"
2004–2005	Passions	Aunt Irma	Recurring role, 14 episodes Nominated — NAACP Image Award for Outstanding Actress in a Daytime Drama Series
2005	ER	Cherise Barnes	Episode: "Only Connect"
2005	Cold Case	Georgie	Episode: "Best Friends"
2008	Lincoln Heights	Hazel Roberson	Episode: "The Day Before Tomorrow"
2011	House of Payne	Florence Johnston	Episode: "Curtis Jefferson"
2012	Southland	Ms. Miller	Episode: "Underwater"
2012–2013	The First Family	Grandma Eddy	Recurring role, 11 episodes
2013	Mr. Box Office	Florence Johnston	Episode: "The Golden Apple"
2014	Old Soul	Agnes	Television film
2014	Charlie Murphy’s Law	Vera Jenkins	Episode: "Reunions"
2015	Scandal	Rose	Episodes: "Where's the Black Lady?" and "The Testimony of Diego Muñoz"
2015	Hot in Cleveland	Marcia	Episode: "Cleveland Calendar Girls"
2015	American Horror Story: Hotel	Cassie Royale	Episode: "She Wants Revenge"
2016	Childrens Hospital	Flossie	Episode: "Doctor Beth"
2016	Second Sight	Nana	Television film
2016–2017	The Carmichael Show	Francis	Episodes: "The Funeral" and "Grandma Francis"
2017	Jalen Vs. Everybody	Grammie	Television film
2017	This Is Us	Theresa	Episode: "I Call Marriage"
2017	Teachers	Mrs. Potts	Episode: "Snap Judgement"
2017	Trial & Error	Mrs. Kratt	Episodes: "A Wrench in the Case" and "A Hostile Jury"
2017–2018	Black-ish	Mabel	Episodes: "I’m a Survivor" and "North Star"
2018	Beyond	Edna	Episode: "Six Feet Deep"
2018	The Thundermans	Sweet Gam Gam	Episode: "Cookie Mistake"
2018	Station 19	Edith	Episodes: "Invisible to Me", "Reignited" and "Let It Burn"
2018	Rel	Miss Jenkins	Episode: "Laundry Room"
2018	NCIS	Rosie Brown	Episode: "Beneath the Surface"
2019	The Neighborhood	Miss Simpson	Episode: "Welcome to the Yard Sale"
2019	Live in Front of a Studio Audience	Florence Johnston	Episode: “Norman Lear's All in the Family and The Jeffersons”
2019	A Black Lady Sketch Show	Mary Jenkins	Episode: "3rd & Bonaparte Is Always in the Shade"
2019	One Fine Christmas	Alice	Television film
2019	Bless This Mess	Belle	Episode: "Goose Glazing Time"
2020	One Day at a Time	Mrs. Jones	Episode: "One Halloween at a Time"
2020	The Last O.G.	Mama Jarvis	Episode: "Ballin"
2021	Young Sheldon	Doris	Episode: "The Geezer Bus and a New Model for Education"
2021	Big Shot	Destiny’s Grandmother	Episode: "Kalm Korn"
2021	Partners in Rhyme	Anita	Episode: "Happy Holidays"
2021–2022	Days of Our Lives	Olivia Price	Recurring role, 11 episodes
2022–2024	Grey's Anatomy	Joyce Ward	4 episodes
2022	Generation Gap	Herself	Episode: "Starring Garla Fibs"
2023	The Ms. Pat Show	Miss Pearl	Episode: "Twenty Seven Side Pieces"
2023	History of the World, Part II	Ruby Seale	Episodes: "II", "V", "VIII"
2023	Unprisoned	Annie	Episode: "Nigrescense"
2024	Not Dead Yet	Nana Sugar	Episode: "Not in the Game Yet"
2025	Will Trent	Ms. Pearl	Episode: "I'm a Guest Here"
2026	Chicago Med	Ruth	Episode: "Frost on Fire"

== Awards and nominations ==
=== Golden Globe Awards ===
The Golden Globe Awards are awards presented annually for excellence in both international film and television. Gibbs has earned 1 nomination.

Year	Category	Work	Result
1985	Best Performance by an Actress in a Supporting Role in a Series, Miniseries or Motion Picture Made for Television	The Jeffersons	Nominated

=== Primetime Emmy Awards ===
The Primetime Emmy Awards are presented annually in recognition of excellence in American primetime television programming. Gibbs has earned 5 nominations.

Year	Category	Work	Result
1981	Outstanding Supporting Actress in a Comedy, Variety or Music Series	The Jeffersons	Nominated
1982	Outstanding Supporting Actress in a Comedy, Variety or Music Series	The Jeffersons	Nominated
1983	Outstanding Supporting Actress in a Comedy, Variety or Music Series	The Jeffersons	Nominated
1984	Outstanding Supporting Actress in a Comedy Series	The Jeffersons	Nominated
1985	Outstanding Supporting Actress in a Comedy Series	The Jeffersons	Nominated

== Bibliography ==
- It's Never Too Late: A Memoir (Amistad, 2026, Hardcover) ISBN 978-0063356634
