= Branden Jacobs-Jenkins =

American playwright (born 1984)

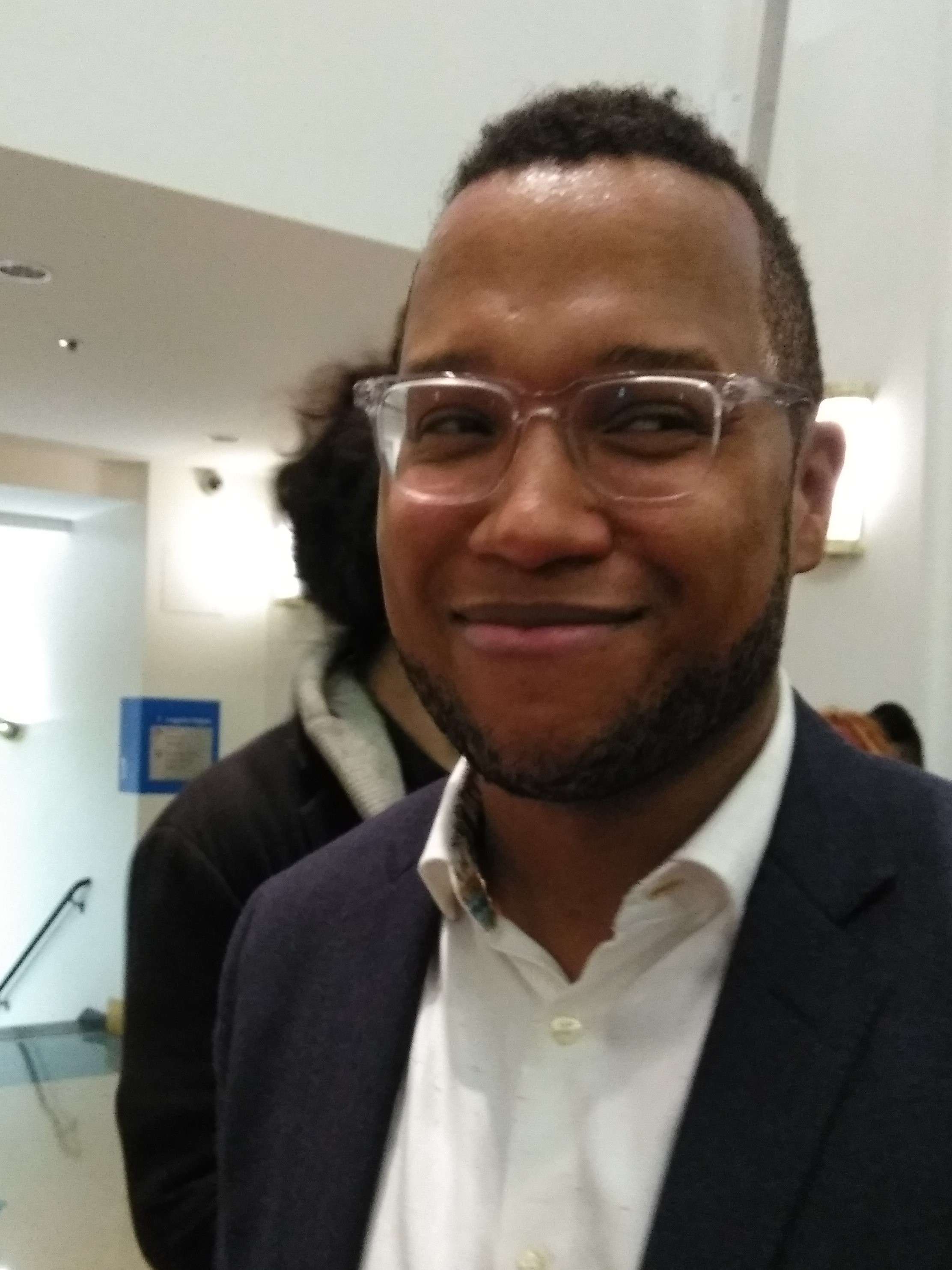
- Jacobs-Jenkins in 2018
- Born: December 29, 1984 (age 41); Washington, DC, U.S.
- Education: Princeton University (BA); New York University (MA); Juilliard School (GrDip)
- Occupation: Playwright
- Writing career
- Notable awards: Fulbright Award; MacArthur Fellow; Obie Award; Steinberg Playwright Award; Tony Award; Pulitzer Prize for Drama

Branden Jacobs-Jenkins (born 1984) is an American playwright. His play Purpose won the 2025 Pulitzer Prize for Drama, for which his works Gloria and Everybody were finalists in 2016 and 2018, respectively. His play Appropriate marked his Broadway debut as a playwright in 2023 and earned him his first Tony Award; he won a second in 2025 for Purpose. His additional plays include An Octoroon and The Comeuppance. He was named a MacArthur Fellow in 2016.

== Early life ==
Jacobs-Jenkins was born in Washington, DC, and raised in the Takoma neighborhood. His father, Benjamin Jenkins, is a retired prison dentist. He and his adopted siblings were raised by a single mother, Patricia Jacobs, who is a Harvard Law School alumna and business owner.

As a child, he attended the Roots Activity Learning Center and fell in love with reading black authors, including playwright August Wilson. He spent his summers in Arkansas, where his maternal grandmother and schoolteacher, Helen Jacobs, stimulated his creativity. At age 13, he made it to the finals of the Scripps National Spelling Bee, stumbling on the word "pinyin".

He was accepted to St. John's College High School in DC, and graduated in 2002.

For college, he went to Princeton, where he earned his bachelor's degree in anthropology in 2006. For graduate school, he attended New York University Tisch School of the Arts, and earned a master's degree in performance studies in 2007.

He has taught playwriting at Hunter College, New York University, Princeton, and Yale University. He graduated from the Lila Acheson Wallace Playwrights Program at The Juilliard School.

Jacobs-Jenkins worked at the New Yorker where he edited and wrote reviews.

== Career ==
In 2013 Jacobs-Jenkins became a member of the Signature Theatre Residency Five program. The program "guarantees three full productions of new work."

Neighbors premiered Off-Broadway at the Public Theater/Public LAB in February - March 2010, and was presented at the Matrix Theatre Company, Los Angeles in August 2010, directed by Nataki Garrett. The play was produced by the Mixed Blood Theater, Minneapolis, Minnesota in September to October 2011, also directed by Nataki Garrett. It premiered in Boston in 2011 with Company One.

He received the 2014 Obie Award for Best New American Play for his plays Appropriate and An Octoroon.

An Octoroon is an adaptation of The Octoroon by Dion Boucicault. It first ran at Performance Space New York from June 24 to July 3, 2010. It ran Off-Off-Broadway at the Soho Rep in April 2014 to June 2014 and then at the Polonsky Shakespeare Center, Brooklyn, New York, from February 2015 to March 29, 2015. Artists Repertory Theatre, Portland, Oregon, staged An Octoroon from September 3 to October 1, 2017.

Appropriate was produced Off-Broadway by the Signature Theatre, at the Pershing Square Signature Center, from March 16, 2014, to April 13, 2014. The play was nominated for the Outer Critics Circle Award for Outstanding New Off-Broadway Play, and also won 2014 Obie Awards for Direction (Liesl Tommy) and Performance (Johanna Day). Michael Billington in his review of the 2019 production at the Donmar Warehouse (London), wrote: "...he appropriates the classic American family drama with results that are both gravely serious and mordantly funny...What is exhilarating about the play is that Jacobs-Jenkins pushes everything to the limits." The play opened on Broadway at the Hayes Theater in December 2023. It won 3 Tony Awards, including Best Revival of a Play, from 8 nominations.

War premiered at the Yale Repertory Theatre, New Haven, in December 2014, as a commission from the Yale Rep. Directed by Lileana Blain-Cruz, the cast featured Tonya Pinkins, Philippe Bowgen, Rachael Holmes, Greg Keller and Trezana Beverley. War opened at the Lincoln Center LCT3 series Off-Broadway on May 21, 2016, in previews, officially on June 6, directed by Lileana Blain-Cruz, and ran through July 3. He wrote War while on a Fulbright Fellowship in Germany.

Everybody was produced Off-Broadway by the Signature Theatre, and opened on January 31, 2017, in previews, officially on February 21. The play is "a modern riff on one of the oldest plays in the English language." Everybody is suggested by the 15th-century morality play Everyman. Directed by Lila Neugebauer, the cast includes Jocelyn Bioh, Brooke Bloom, Michael Braun, Marylouise Burke, Louis Cancelmi, Lilyana Tiare Cornell, David Patrick Kelly, Lakisha Michelle May and Chris Perfetti. The role of Everybody is chosen by lottery. Jacobs-Jenkins explained the play: "The concept...is that every night there’ll be a different Everyman, chosen by lottery, so the cast will shift a lot. This may be an insane idea. We’re assuming all these lovely actors are going to memorize the entire script.” Everybody was a finalist for the 2018 Pulitzer Prize for Drama.

His play Girls premiered at Yale Repertory Theatre from October 4, 2019, to October 26. The play was directed by Lileana Blain-Cruz and choreographed by Raja Feather Kelly. The play is a contemporary version of Euripides’ Greek tragedy The Bacchae, and contains dance music and live-streaming video.

His work has been seen at The Public Theater, Signature Theater, PS122, Soho Rep, Yale Repertory Theatre, Actors Theater of Louisville, The Matrix Theatre in Los Angeles, Mixed Blood Theatre in Minneapolis, the Wilma Theater (Philadelphia), CompanyOne and SpeakEasy Stage in Boston, Theater Bielefeld in Bielefeld, Germany, the National Theatre in London, and the HighTide Festival in the UK.

Jacobs-Jenkins currently serves on the board of Soho Rep in New York City.

In 2019, he joined the faculty of the University of Texas at Austin MFA playwriting program. At Texas, he worked with Annie Baker, who served as co-artistic directors for the MFA playwriting program at Hunter College of the City University of New York.

In 2021, he joined the Yale Faculty of Arts and Sciences as a professor in the practice of Theater and Performance Studies.

In 2023, his play The Comeuppance, a story about a group of thirtysomethings who reunite at a cursed high-school reunion, opened Off-Broadway.

His play Purpose transferred to Broadway's Helen Hayes Theater beginning in February 2025 after a critically acclaimed run at Chicago's Steppenwolf Theatre.

=== Gloria ===
Gloria was produced Off-Broadway at the Vineyard Theatre from June 15, 2015, to July 18, 2015, and was directed by Evan Cabnet. The play received a workshop at the Vineyard Theatre in January 2013. The play concerns an "ambitious group of editorial assistants at a notorious Manhattan magazine." Gloria was nominated for the 2016 Lucille Lortel Award, Outstanding Play. Gloria was a finalist for the 2016 Pulitzer Prize for Drama. The Pulitzer committee wrote: "A play of wit and irony that deftly transports the audience from satire to thriller and back again." Gloria received two nominations for the Outer Critics Circle Award: Outstanding New Off-Broadway Play; and Outstanding Director of a Play. The play was nominated for the 2016 Drama League Award for Outstanding Production of a Broadway or Off-Broadway Play.

A production was staged at London's Hampstead Theatre in June and July 2017.

A production was staged at San Francisco's American Conservatory Theater opening in February 2020 and closed early due to the COVID-19 pandemic. A livestream of the show was made available for a limited time.

== Honors ==
In 2010 he won a Fulbright Award which funded him while studying and developing plays in Germany at the Freie Universität Berlin. He then went on to receive the Helen Merrill Award in Playwrighting—Emerging Playwright category—in 2011 followed by the Paula Vogel Award from the Vineyard Theatre in the same year. The award is "presented annually to an emerging writer of exceptional promise." It provided him a 2011 residency at the Vineyard Theatre.

In 2015, he won the Steinberg Playwrights Award. Paige Evans, the artistic director of LCT3 said that his "plays are fiercely intelligent, ambitious, and boldly theatrical.... They challenge, entertain, and unsettle audiences, making us laugh, gasp, and think deeply about race, class, personal ambition, and other complex issues.”

He received the Windham–Campbell Literature Prize (Drama) at Yale University in 2016; the prize includes a cash amount of $150,000. He received the 2016 PEN/Laura Pels Theater Award, Emerging American Playwright. In 2016, he also received a Creative Capital award with collaborating artist Carmelita Tropicana.

He was named a MacArthur Fellow, Class of 2016. The fellowship comes with a monetary award of $625,000, made in installments over five years. The foundation noted, in part: "Many of Jacobs-Jenkins’s plays use a historical lens to satirize and comment on modern culture, particularly the ways in which race and class are negotiated in both private and public settings."

In 2015 and 2018, Jacobs-Jenkins was a finalist for the Pulitzer Prize for Drama for his plays Gloria and Everybody. In 2025, he received the prize for Purpose.

In 2020, he was awarded USA Artists and John Simon Guggenheim Memorial Foundation Fellowships.

== Personal life ==
In 2019, he married actor Cheo Bourne. The couple have a daughter together.

== Works ==
=== Plays ===
- Neighbors (Off-Broadway, 2010) (Note: Written in December of 2007.)
- War (Yale Repertory Theatre, 2014)
- Appropriate (Off-Broadway, 2014) (Broadway, 2023)
- An Octoroon (Off-Broadway, 2014)
- Gloria (Off-Broadway, 2015)
- Everybody (Off-Broadway, 2017)
- Girls (Yale Repertory Theatre, 2019)
- The Comeuppance (Off-Broadway, 2023) (London, 2024)
- Purpose (Steppenwolf Theatre Company, 2024) (Broadway, 2025)
- Grass (Park Avenue Armory, 2027)

=== Musicals ===
- Purple Rain: The Musical (State Theatre, 2025)

=== Other works ===
- The Skin of Our Teeth – contributed additional material for Lincoln Center's 2022 production
- Give Me Carmelita Tropicana! (Soho Repertory Theater, 2024) – co-written with Carmelita Tropicana

== Awards and nominations ==
Year	Award	Category	Work	Result
2016	Pulitzer Prize	Drama	Gloria	Nominated
2017	Critics’ Circle Theatre Award	Most Promising Playwright	Gloria and An Octoroon	Won
2018	Pulitzer Prize	Drama	Everybody	Nominated
2024	Tony Awards	Best Revival of a Play	Appropriate	Won
2025	Tony Awards	Best Play	Purpose	Won
2025	Pulitzer Prize	Drama	Purpose	Won
2025	American Theatre Critics Association Award	Harold and Mimi Steinberg/ATCA New Play Award	Purpose	Won
2025	Dorian Award	LGBTQ Theater Artist of the Season		Won
