= Jake T. Austin =

American actor (born 1994)

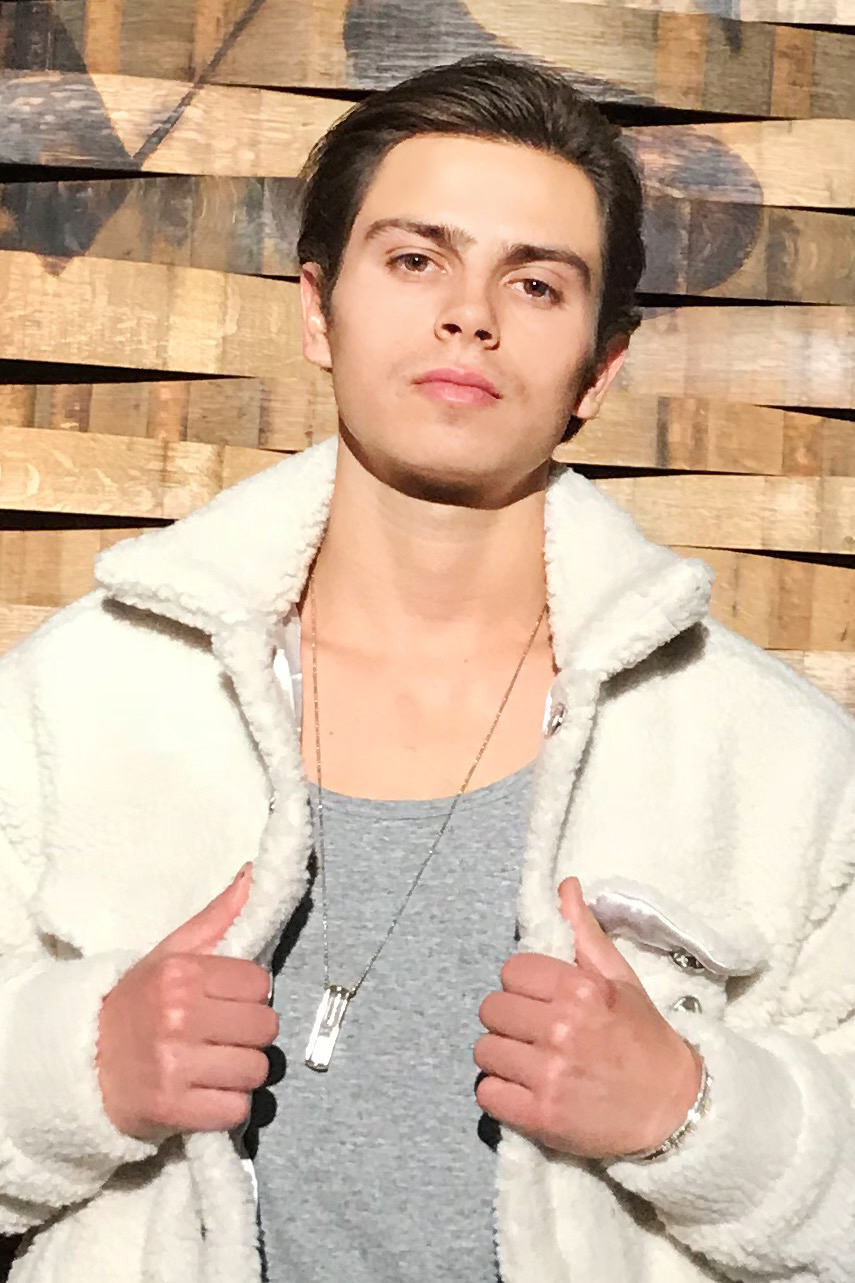
- Austin in 2018
- Born: Jake Austin Szymanski; December 3, 1994 (age 31); New York City, U.S.
- Other name: Jake Austin
- Occupation: Actor
- Years active: 2002–present

Jake Austin Szymanski (born December 3, 1994), known professionally as Jake T. Austin, is an American actor. Beginning his career as a child actor at the age of seven, Austin is best known for his role as Max Russo on the Disney Channel series Wizards of Waverly Place, and as the original voice of Diego on the Nickelodeon animated series Go, Diego, Go!. Austin was also the original actor who portrayed Jesus Foster on the ABC Family family/teen drama series The Fosters. His feature film credits include co-starring roles in Hotel for Dogs, New Year's Eve, Rio and The Emoji Movie.

== Early life ==
Austin was born on December 3, 1994, in New York City, the son of Giny Rodriquez Toranzo and Joe Szymanski. His middle initial, "T", is taken from his mother's maiden name. His mother is of Puerto Rican, Argentine, and Spanish descent, and his father is of Polish, Irish, and English ancestry. Austin embraces his Puerto Rican heritage, though he has said that he is not fluent in Spanish. He has a younger sister, Ava.

== Career ==
=== 2002–2006: Beginnings ===
Austin in 2008

Austin's career began in 2002 when he appeared in commercials. A year later, he appeared in his first credited acting role as Kid 1698 in a comedy sketch on Late Show with David Letterman. In 2005, he landed his first major role – voicing Diego, the cousin of Dora, on the hit Nickelodeon animated series Dora the Explorer. He continued to voice Diego on the spin-off series, Go, Diego, Go!, for three seasons. Along with voicing Diego, Austin was cast in multiple voice roles for the feature films The Ant Bully and Everyone's Hero – he was also cast in the Comedy Central special Merry F %$in' Christmas. In 2006, Austin landed the lead role of Angel Macias in his first live-action feature film, The Perfect Game, which was based on a true story about the first non-U.S. team to win the 1957 Little League World Series. The film would not be released in the United States until more than three years later due to post-production financing difficulties.

=== 2007–2011: Wizards of Waverly Place ===
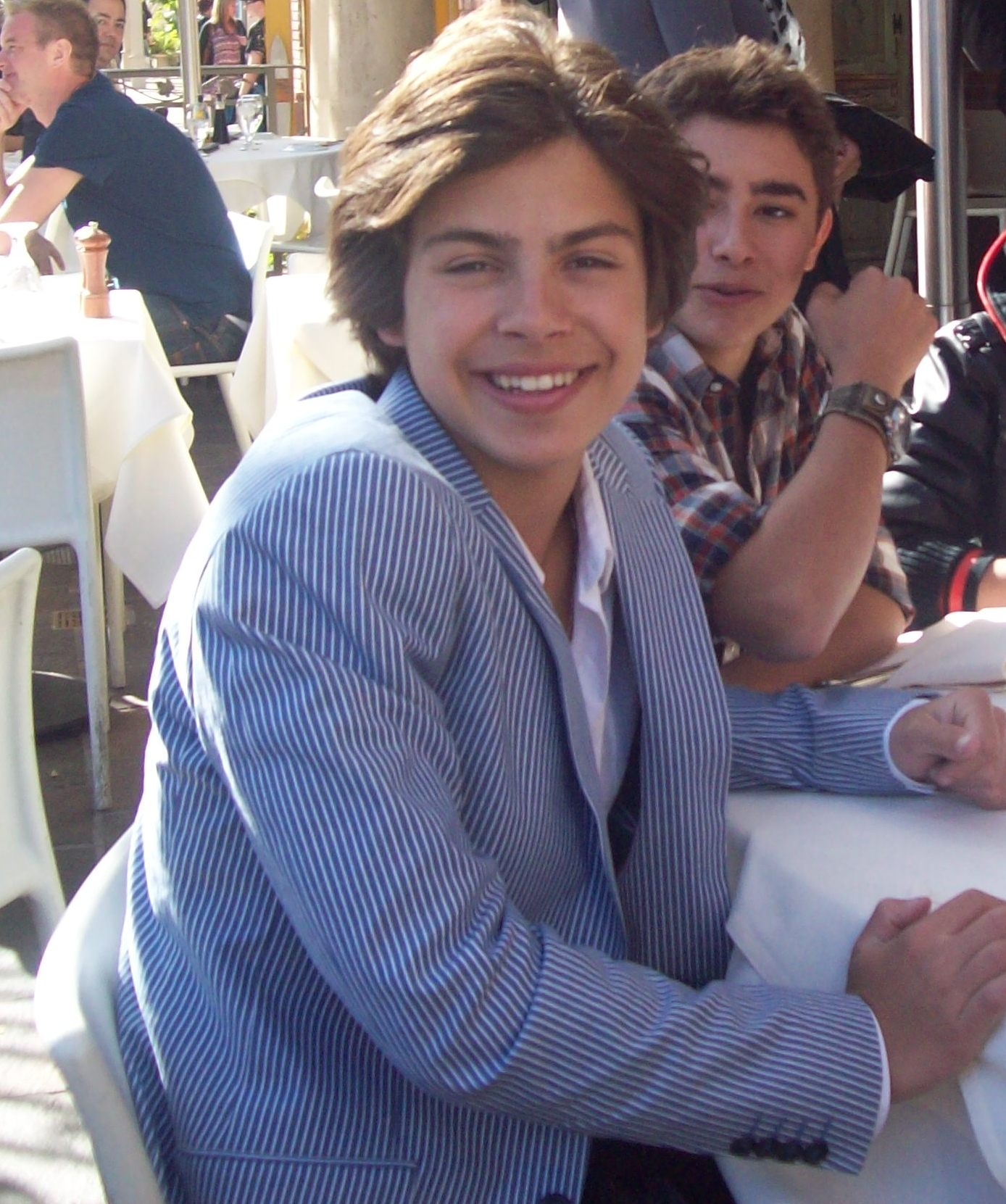
Austin at the premiere of The Perfect Game in 2010

Austin appeared in his first Walt Disney Company production in 2007 when he portrayed Chris in the Disney Channel original film Johnny Kapahala: Back on Board. Later that same year, he was cast as Max Russo in the Disney Channel series Wizards of Waverly Place. He played the youngest sibling of a wizarding family, co-starring with Selena Gomez and David Henrie. Until the end of Wizards of Waverly Place in 2011, Austin appeared in multiple Disney productions. In the summer of 2009, he played the role of Max Russo in the Wizards on Deck crossover episode which included two other popular Disney shows, The Suite Life on Deck and Hannah Montana.

During the same summer, he starred in the television film Wizards of Waverly Place: The Movie. The film was a ratings hit, becoming the second most-viewed Disney Channel film at that time, behind High School Musical 2. It was also the #1 scripted telecast of 2009. Austin made his live action feature film debut in 2009 with the role of Bruce, an orphan who hides numerous dogs in an abandoned hotel, in the DreamWorks film Hotel for Dogs. In the fall of 2010, Austin was named as one of the "25 Brightest Latino Stars Under 25" by Latina magazine. He wrote and sold his first screenplay, Kings of Suburbia, which he described as being written in the same vein as his favorite film Stand by Me.

=== 2011–2015: The Fosters ===
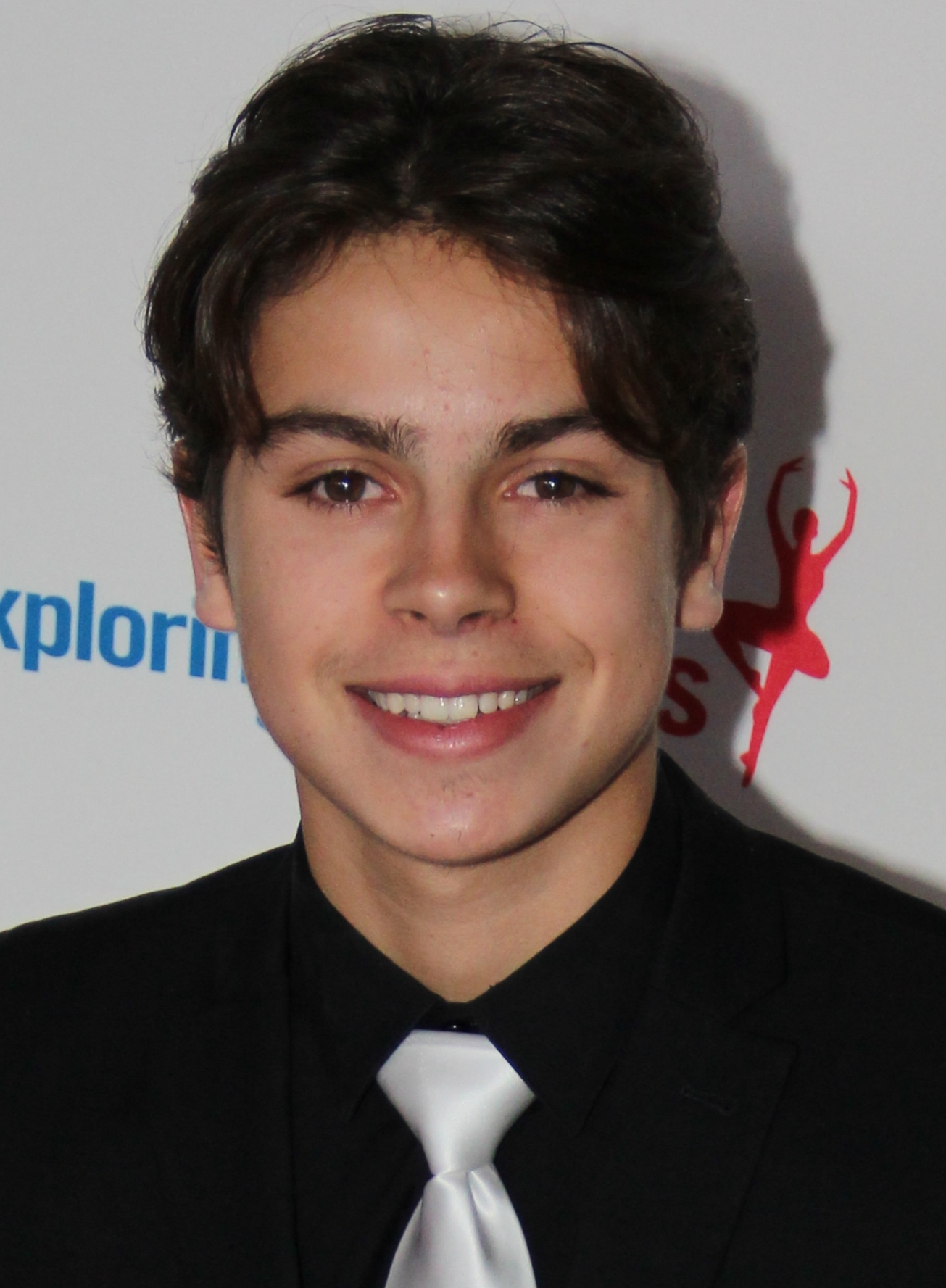
Austin in September 2011

In 2011, Austin voiced the role of Fernando, an orphaned Brazilian boy who is forced to capture exotic birds, in the 20th Century Fox animated musical film Rio. He reprised the role in the sequel, Rio 2. He was also in the romantic-comedy film New Year's Eve, released in December 2011. The following year, he had guest roles on the Lifetime comedy-drama Drop Dead Diva as Samuel Forman, a 16-year-old multimillionaire, and on the NBC legal drama series Law & Order: Special Victims Unit as Rob Fisher, the boyfriend of a girl whose family is murdered.

Austin landed his next major role in 2013, when he was cast as Jesus Foster in the ABC Family family/teen drama series The Fosters. The series tells the story of two moms raising both biological and foster children in a "multi-ethnic" household in San Diego, California. He played Jesus for two seasons until he left the show in the second-season finale in 2015. In a statement on his departure, Austin said: "I'm honored to have been a part of such a groundbreaking series ... Thank you for letting me be a part of your family, it's been a pleasure." His role was recast for the third season, with Noah Centineo.

=== 2016–present ===
In 2016, he provided the voice for Jaime Reyes / Blue Beetle in the DC Comics animated direct-to-video film Justice League vs. Teen Titans. On August 30, 2016, Austin was revealed as one of the contestants who would compete on season 23 of Dancing with the Stars. He was partnered with professional dancer, Jenna Johnson. On September 20, 2016, Austin and Johnson were announced as the first couple to be eliminated from the competition. In October 2018, it was announced that Austin joined the cast of Adverse, a neo-noir thriller starring Mickey Rourke. Adverse had its premiere at the opening of the Fantasporto Festival on February 28, 2020, in Portugal.

== Personal life ==
Austin divides his time between living in Los Angeles and New York. He has two dogs, Bogey and Beju. His family owns a restaurant called The Clarksville Inn in West Nyack, New York, which was originally built in 1840 and served as a hotel.

Austin devotes time to various charitable causes including the Make-A-Wish Foundation, which grants wishes to children who have life-threatening medical conditions; the Starlight Children's Foundation, which is dedicated to improving the quality of life for children with chronic and life-threatening medical conditions; and Variety's Power of Youth initiative, which partners with young stars to help raise money for their chosen causes. He has also supported the Boys & Girls Clubs of America, stating "I know how important it is to have a supportive environment and feel good about yourself, especially as an adolescent."

In October 2020, Austin discussed his biracial familial heritage and the importance of voting in the upcoming election: "... whether it's via mail-in voting or at the polling place, becoming active in the electoral process is so important. Whether the person on the ticket is running for local, state or national positions, our role as their constituents starts with voting."

== Filmography ==
=== Film ===
| Year | Title | Role | Notes |
|---|---|---|---|
| 2006 | The Ant Bully | Nicky | Voice |
| 2006 | Everyone's Hero | Yankee Irving | Voice |
| 2009 | Hotel for Dogs | Bruce | |
| 2010 | The Perfect Game | Angel Macias | |
| 2011 | Rio | Fernando | Voice |
| 2011 | New Year's Eve | Seth Anderson | |
| 2013 | Khumba | Khumba | Voice |
| 2014 | Rio 2 | Fernando | Voice |
| 2014 | Tom Sawyer & Huckleberry Finn | Huckleberry Finn | |
| 2014 | Grantham & Rose | Grantham Portnoy | |
| 2016 | Justice League vs. Teen Titans | Jaime Reyes / Blue Beetle | Voice |
| 2017 | Teen Titans: The Judas Contract | Jaime Reyes / Blue Beetle | Voice |
| 2017 | The Emoji Movie | Alex | Voice |
| 2017 | The Valley | Chris | |
| 2020 | Adverse | Lars | |
| TBA | Pledge Trip | Johnny | |
| TBA | Black Friday | Joe | |

=== Television ===
| Year | Title | Role | Notes |
|---|---|---|---|
| 2003 | Late Show with David Letterman | Kid 1698 | Episode: "December 23, 2003" |
| 2004 | Dora the Explorer | Diego | Voice, 3 episodes |
| 2005–2009 | Go, Diego, Go! | Diego | Voice, main role (seasons 1–3) |
| 2005 | Merry F#%$in' Christmas | Various | Voice, TV special |
| 2007 | Johnny Kapahala: Back on Board | Chris | Television film |
| 2007–2012 | Wizards of Waverly Place | Max Russo | Main role |
| 2008 | Happy Monster Band | Bluz | Voice, 10 episodes |
| 2009 | Wizards of Waverly Place: The Movie | Max Russo | Television film |
| 2009 | The Suite Life on Deck | Max Russo | Episode: "Double-Crossed" |
| 2012 | Drop Dead Diva | Samuel Forman | Episode: "Home" |
| 2012 | Law & Order: Special Victims Unit | Rob Fisher | Episode: "Home Invasions" |
| 2013 | The Wizards Return: Alex vs. Alex | Max Russo | Television special |
| 2013–2015 | The Fosters | Jesus Foster | Main role (seasons 1–2) |
| 2016 | Dancing with the Stars | Himself | Contestant on season 23 |
| 2017 | Justice League Action | Jaime Reyes / Blue Beetle | Voice, 2 episodes |
| 2024 | Killing for Extra Credit | Ray | TV Movie |
| 2025 | The Rise | Angel Ramirez | Episode: "Expanding" |

=== Video game ===
| Year | Title | Role | Notes |
|---|---|---|---|
| 2008 | Dora the Explorer: Dora Saves the Mermaids | Diego Marquez | |
| 2008 | Go, Diego, Go! Safari Rescue | Diego Marquez | |

== Awards and nominations ==
| Year | Award | Category | Work | Result | Ref. |
|---|---|---|---|---|---|
| 2006 | Young Artist Award | Best Performance in a Voice-Over Role – Young Actor | Go, Diego, Go! | Nominated | |
| 2007 | Imagen Awards | Best Actor – Television | Go, Diego, Go! | Nominated | |
| 2007 | Young Artist Award | Best Performance in a Voice-Over Role – Young Actor | Everyone's Hero | Nominated | |
| 2008 | ALMA Award | Outstanding Male Performance in a Comedy TV Series | Wizards of Waverly Place | Nominated | |
| 2008 | Young Artist Award | Best Young Ensemble Performance in a TV Series (with Selena Gomez, David Henrie, and Jennifer Stone) | Wizards of Waverly Place | Nominated | |
| 2009 | ALMA Award | Year in TV Comedy – Actor | Wizards of Waverly Place | Nominated | |
| 2009 | Imagen Awards | Best Actor – Television | Wizards of Waverly Place | Nominated | |
| 2009 | Teen Choice Awards | Choice TV: Sidekick | Wizards of Waverly Place | Nominated | |
| 2009 | Young Artist Award | Best Performance in a TV Series – Leading Young Actor | Wizards of Waverly Place | Nominated | |
| 2010 | Young Artist Award | Best Performance in a Feature Film – Leading Young Actor | Hotel for Dogs | Nominated | |
| 2010 | Young Artist Award | Best Performance in a TV Series – Leading Young Actor | Wizards of Waverly Place | Nominated | |
| 2012 | Hollywood Teen TV Awards | Favorite Television Actor | Wizards of Waverly Place | Won | |
| 2013 | Nickelodeon Kids' Choice Awards | Favorite TV Actor | Wizards of Waverly Place | Nominated | |
| 2013 | Teen Choice Awards | Summer TV Star: Male | The Fosters | Nominated | |
| 2014 | Teen Choice Awards | Choice TV Actor: Drama | The Fosters | Nominated | |
| 2015 | Teen Choice Awards | Choice TV Actor: Drama | The Fosters | Nominated | |
