= Matt Tierney (sound designer) =

- Occupation: Sound designer
- Awards: Obie Award (2012); Lucille Lortel Award (2012); Drama Desk Award for Outstanding Sound Design in a Play (2014)

Matt Tierney is a sound designer for theater.

== Awards ==
Tierney and Ben Williams won the 2012 Obie Award for Sound Design for The Select (The Sun Also Rises) and the 2012 Lucille Lortel Award for Outstanding Sound Design.

Tierney also won a Drama Desk Award for Outstanding Sound Design in a Play in 2014 for Machinal.

Tierney was nominated for a Tony Award for Best Sound Design in 2014, for Machinal.
