= Femme fatale =

Stock character of a mysterious, beautiful, and seductive woman

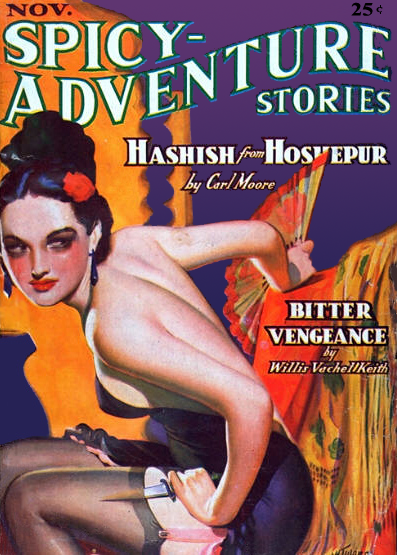
Femmes fatales were standard fare in hardboiled crime stories in 1930s pulp-fiction.

A femme fatale (/ˌfɛm fəˈtæl, -ˈtɑːl/ FEM fə-TA(H)L, French: [fam fatal]; lit. 'fatal woman'), sometimes called a maneater, Mata Hari, or vamp, is an archetype in literature and art and a stock character. The individual is often depicted as a mysterious, beautiful, and seductive woman whose charms ensnare her lovers, often leading them into compromising or deadly traps. Her ability to enchant, entice and hypnotize her victims with a spell was seen in the earliest stories as verging on supernatural; hence, the femme fatale is often described as having a power over men at the level of a seductress, enchantress, or even witch. Femmes fatales, typically villainous or at least morally ambiguous, aim to evoke a sense of mystification and unease.

The term "femme fatale" originates from the French phrase femme fatale, which means 'deadly woman' or 'lethal woman'. A femme fatale tries to achieve her hidden purpose by using feminine wiles such as beauty, charm, or sexual allure. In many cases, her attitude towards sexuality is lackadaisical, intriguing, or frivolous. In some cases, she uses lies or coercion rather than charm. She may also make use of some subduing weapon such as sleeping gas, a modern analog of magical powers in older tales. She may also be (or imply that she is) a victim, caught in a situation from which she cannot escape.

The synonym "vamp" (a clipping of "vampire") dates from at least 1911. Early 20th-century American films dubbed the femme fatale character a vamp, in reference to The Vampire, Philip Burne-Jones's 1897 painting, and Rudyard Kipling's later 1897 poem of the same name, as well as to the 1909 play and 1915 film A Fool There Was.

Female mobsters (including Italian-American Mafia or Russian Mafia women) have been portrayed as femmes fatales in films noir. Femmes fatales are a recurring element in James Bond films.

== History ==
=== Ancient archetypes ===
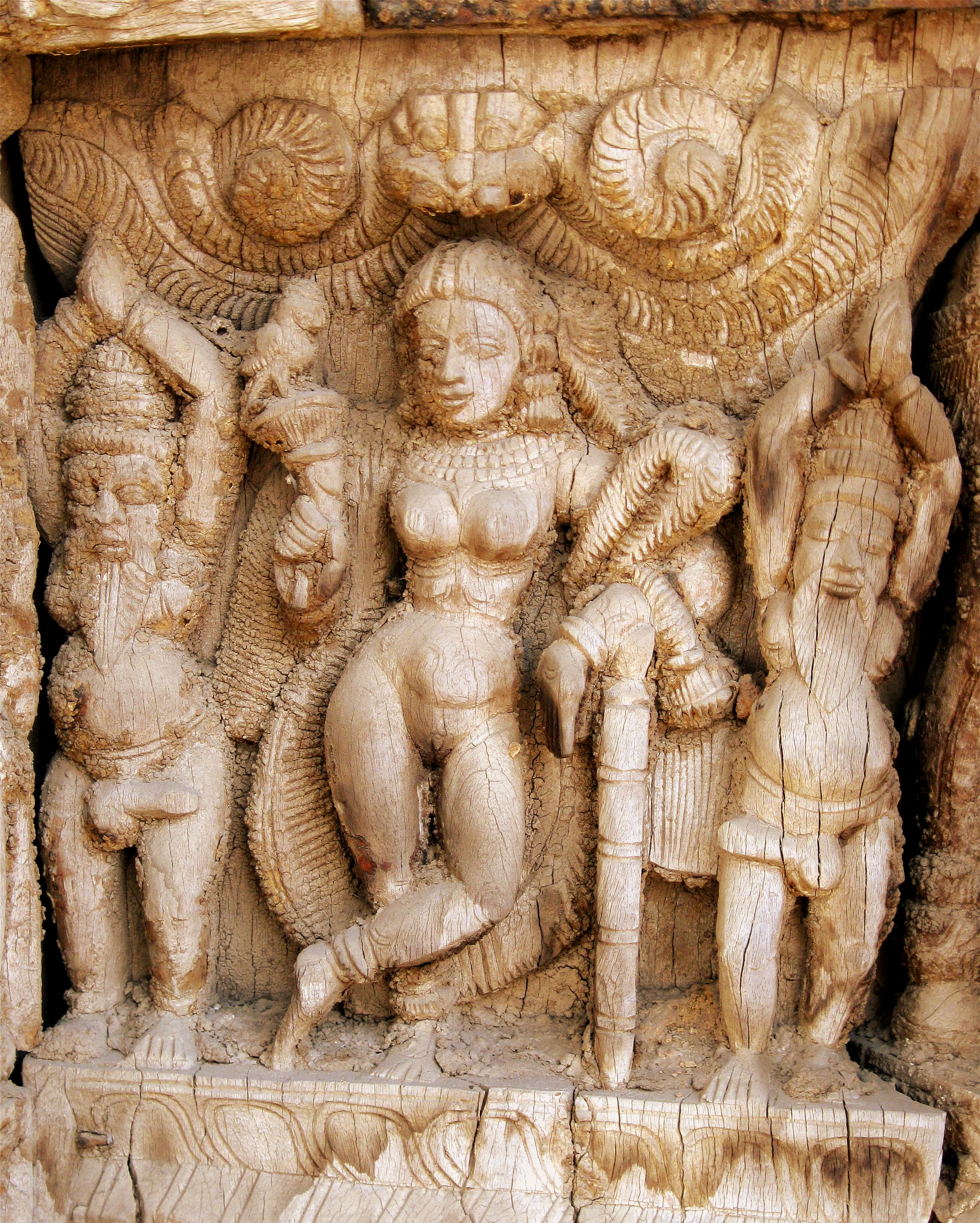
The divine femme fatale of Hindu lore, The goddess Mohini is described to have enchanted gods, demons and sages alike.

The femme fatale archetype exists in the culture, folklore and myths of many cultures. Ancient mythical or legendary examples include Inanna, Lilith, Circe, Medea, Clytemnestra, Lesbia, Tamamo no Mae, and Visha Kanyas. Historical examples from classical times include Cleopatra and Messalina, as well as the biblical figures Delilah, Jezebel, and Salome. An example from Chinese literature and traditional history is Daji.

=== Early Western culture to the 19th century ===
The femme fatale was a common figure in the European Middle Ages, often portraying the dangers of unbridled female sexuality. The pre-medieval inherited biblical figure of Eve offers an example, as does the wicked, seductive enchantress typified in Morgan le Fay. The Queen of the Night in Mozart's The Magic Flute shows her more muted presence during the Age of Enlightenment.

The femme fatale flourished in the Romantic period in the works of John Keats, notably "La Belle Dame sans Merci" and "Lamia". Along with them, there rose the gothic novel The Monk by Matthew Gregory Lewis, featuring Matilda, a very powerful femme fatale. This led to her appearing in the work of Edgar Allan Poe, and as the vampire, notably in Carmilla and Brides of Dracula. The Monk was greatly admired by the Marquis de Sade, for whom the femme fatale symbolised not evil, but all the best qualities of women; his novel Juliette is perhaps the earliest wherein the femme fatale triumphs.Pre-Raphaelite painters frequently used the classic personifications of the femme fatale as a subject.

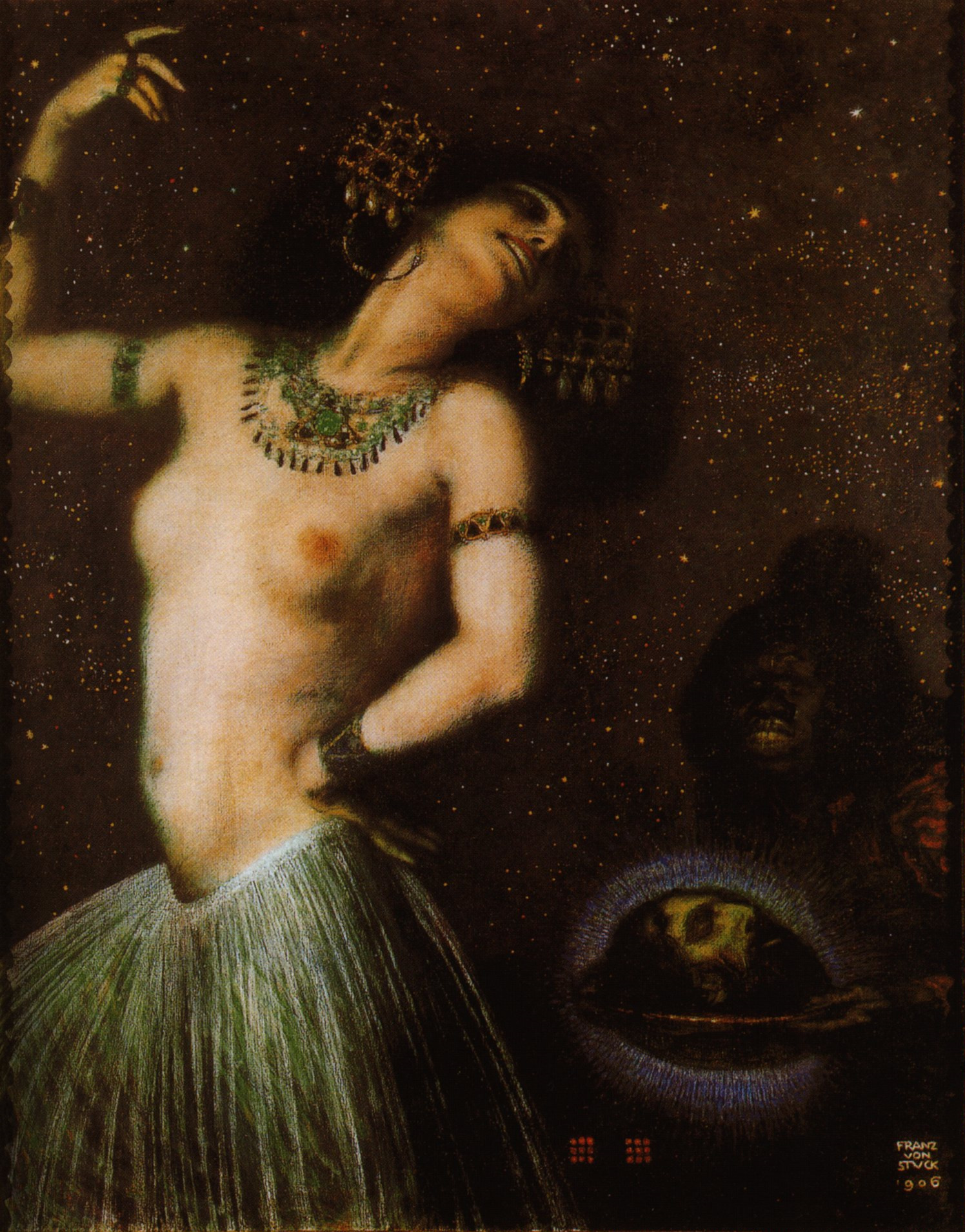
Salome in a 1906 painting by Franz von Stuck

In the Western culture of the late 19th and early 20th centuries, the femme fatale became a more fashionable trope, and she is found in the paintings of the artists Edvard Munch, Gustav Klimt, Franz von Stuck, and Gustave Moreau. The 1884 novel À rebours by Joris-Karl Huysmans includes these fevered imaginings about an image of Salome in a Moreau painting:

No longer was she merely the dancing-girl who extorts a cry of lust and concupiscence from an old man by the lascivious contortions of her body; who breaks the will, masters the mind of a King by the spectacle of her quivering bosoms, heaving belly and tossing thighs; she was now revealed in a sense as the symbolic incarnation of world-old Vice, the goddess of immortal Hysteria, the Curse of Beauty supreme above all other beauties by the cataleptic spasm that stirs her flesh and steels her muscles, – a monstrous Beast of the Apocalypse, indifferent, irresponsible, insensible, poisoning.

— Joris-Karl Huysmans, À rebours, Sisters of Salome

In 1891, Oscar Wilde wrote the play Salome, in which Salome manipulates her lust-crazed stepfather, King Herod, with her enticing Dance of the Seven Veils (Wilde's invention) to agree to her imperious demand: "bring me the head of John the Baptist". Later, Salome was the subject of an opera by Strauss, and was popularized on stage, screen, and peep show booths in countless incarnations.

She also is seen as a prominent figure in late 19th- and 20th-century opera, appearing in Richard Wagner's Parsifal (Kundry), Georges Bizet's Carmen, Camille Saint-Saëns' Samson et Delilah and Alban Berg's Lulu (based on the plays Erdgeist and Die Büchse der Pandora by Frank Wedekind).

Other considerably famous femmes fatales include Isabella of France, Hedda Gabler of Kristiania (now Oslo), Marie Antoinette of Austria, and, most famously, Lucrezia Borgia.

=== 20th-century genres ===
==== Early 20th century ====
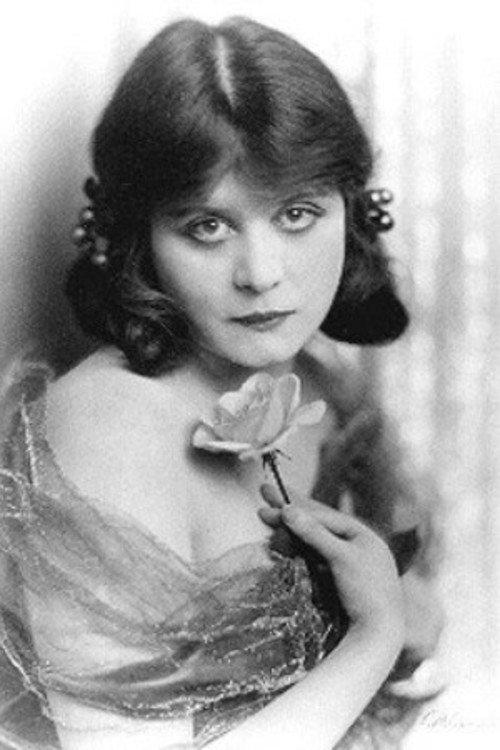
Actress Theda Bara, in the 1915 film A Fool There Was

Mrs Patrick Campbell, George Bernard Shaw's "second famed platonic love affair", (she published some of his letters) and Philip Burne-Jones's lover and subject of his 1897 painting, The Vampire, inspired Burne-Jones's cousin Rudyard Kipling to write his poem "The Vampire", in the year Dracula was published. The poem, which began: "A fool there was ...", inspired Porter Emerson Browne to write the play, A Fool There Was.

The poem was adapted to become a 1909 Broadway production. This was followed by The 1913 film The Vampire by Robert Vignola, containing a "vamp" dance. Protagonist Alice Hollister was publicised as "the original vampire". The 1915 film, A Fool There Was, starring Theda Bara, as "The Vamp" followed. The short poem may have been used in the publicity for the 1915 film. 1910s American slang for femme fatale was vamp, for vampire.

Another icon of the time was Margaretha Geertruida Zelle. While working as an exotic dancer, she took the stage name Mata Hari. She was accused of German espionage during World War I and was put to death by a French firing squad. After her death she became the subject of many sensational films and books, including, but not limited to: Mata Hari (1927), Dishonored (1931), Up the Front (1972).

Femmes fatales appear widely in detective fiction, especially in its 'hard-boiled' sub-genre, which largely originated with the crime stories of Dashiell Hammett in the 1920s. A tone that carried through to the 1930's in which one fictional French-Canadian villainess, Marie de Sabrevois, gave a contemporary edge to "one of America's most Popular historical novelists", Kenneth Roberts, set during the American Revolution.

A Jazz Age vamp (also known as a "baby vamp") was defined by F. Scott Fitzgerald in reference to one of his "careless" flapper characters, as a siren - 'a picker up and thrower away of men, an unscrupulous and fundamentally unmoved toyer with affections.' Greta Garbo and Marlene Dietrich were considered femme fatales in the late 1920s and early 1930s. A vamp, "was exotic, luxurious, and escapist, epitomizing the excess of the Roaring Twenties."

Film villainesses of this vamp variety often appeared foreign, mostly of Eastern European or Asian ancestry. They were a contrast to the wholesome, and virginal personas of actresses such as Lillian Gish and Mary Pickford. Notable silent-cinema vamps include Theda Bara and Anna May Wong.

==== Classic film noir era ====
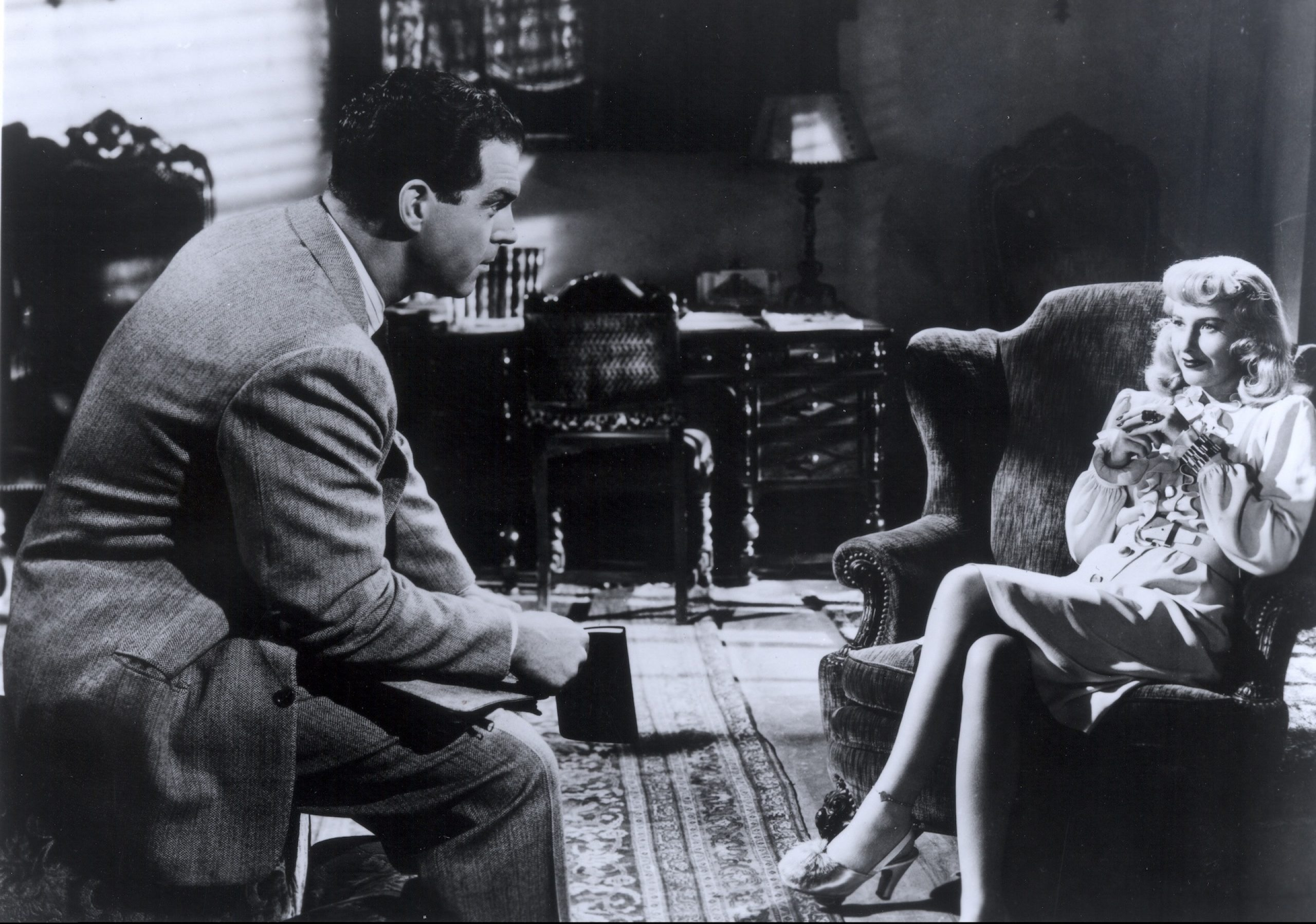
Femme fatale Phyllis Dietrichson, played by Barbara Stanwyck, in the classic film noir Double Indemnity

During the era of classic film-noirs of the 1940s and 1950s, the femme fatale flourished in American cinema. The archetypal femme fatale is Phyllis Dietrichson, played by Barbara Stanwyck (who was nominated for the Academy Award for Best Actress for this role) in the 1944 film Double Indemnity. This character is considered one of the best femme fatale roles in film noir history. The character was ranked as the #8 film villain of the first 100 years of American cinema by the American Film Institute in the AFI's 100 Years... 100 Heroes and Villains. In a classical film noir trope, she manipulates a man into killing her husband for financial gain.

Other examples of femme fatale include the Dorothy Dandridge as the titular character in Carmen Jones, Brigid O'Shaughnessy, portrayed by Mary Astor, who murders Sam Spade's partner in The Maltese Falcon (1941); manipulative narcissistic daughter Veda (portrayed by Ann Blyth) in Mildred Pierce who exploits her indulgent mother Mildred (portrayed by Joan Crawford) and fatally destroys her mother's remarriage to stepfather Monte Barragon (portrayed by Zachary Scott); Gene Tierney as Ellen Brent Harland in Leave Her to Heaven (1945), and the cabaret singer portrayed by Rita Hayworth in Gilda (1946), narcissistic wives who manipulate their husbands; Ava Gardner in The Killers and Cora (Lana Turner) in The Postman Always Rings Twice, based on novels by Ernest Hemingway and James M. Cain respectively, manipulate men into killing their husbands.

In the Hitchcock film The Paradine Case (1947), Alida Valli's character causes the deaths of two men and the near destruction of another. Another frequently cited example is the character Jane played by Lizabeth Scott in Too Late for Tears (1949): during her quest to keep some dirty money from its rightful recipient and her husband, she uses poison, lies, sexual teasing and a gun to keep men wrapped around her finger. Jane Greer is notable as a murderous femme fatale using her wiles on Robert Mitchum in Out of the Past (1947). In Gun Crazy (1950), the femme fatale lures a man into a life of crime. In Hitchcock's 1940 film and Daphne du Maurier's 1938 novel Rebecca, the eponymous femme fatale completely dominates the plot, even though she is already dead and we never see an image of her.

==== Since the 1980s ====
The femme fatale is one of the most mesmerizing of sexual personae. She is not a fiction but an extrapolation of biologic realities in women that remain constant.

— Sexual Personae (1990) by Camille Paglia

The femme fatale character has continued in films such as Body Heat (1981) and Prizzi's Honor (1985) – both with Kathleen Turner, Blade Runner (1982) with Sean Young, The Fourth Man (1983) with Renée Soutendijk, The Hunger (1983) with Catherine Deneuve, Blue Velvet (1986) with Isabella Rossellini, Fatal Attraction (1987) with Glenn Close, Basic Instinct (1992) with Sharon Stone, Damage (1992) with Juliette Binoche, Final Analysis (1992) with Kim Basinger, Dream Lover (1993) with Mädchen Amick, The Crush (1993) with Alicia Silverstone, Pulp Fiction (1994) with Uma Thurman, The Last Seduction (1994) with Linda Fiorentino, To Die For (1995) with Nicole Kidman, Lost Highway (1997) with Patricia Arquette, Devil in the Flesh (1998) and Jawbreaker (1999), both with Rose McGowan, Cruel Intentions (1999) with Sarah Michelle Gellar, Original Sin (2001) with Angelina Jolie, Femme Fatale (2002) with Rebecca Romijn, Sherlock Holmes (2009) with Rachel McAdams, and Jennifer's Body (2009) with Megan Fox. In 2013, Tania Raymonde played the title role in Jodi Arias: Dirty Little Secret. In 2014, Eva Green portrayed a femme fatale in Sin City: A Dame to Kill For and Rosamund Pike starred in Gone Girl. In Babylon (2022), Margot Robbie plays a character with femme fatale tendencies. Mia Goth has portrayed manipulative female antagonists in Pearl (2022) and Infinity Pool (2023). In 2026, Inde Navarrette starred as a crazed, obsessed character in Obsession.

Academy Award-winning actress Marion Cotillard has frequently played femmes fatales, in such films as A Private Affair (2002), A Very Long Engagement, The Black Box, Inception, Midnight in Paris, The Dark Knight Rises and Macbeth. In addition to her role in To Die For, Nicole Kidman has played femmes fatales in films such as Malice, Moulin Rouge!, The Paperboy, and The Northman. Eva Green has also played a femme fatale witch in Dark Shadows (2012).

The archetype is also abundant in American television. One of the most famous femmes fatales of American television is Sherilyn Fenn's Audrey Horne in the David Lynch cult series Twin Peaks. The horror anthology series American Horror Story has featured various cunning femme fatales played by Jessica Lange. The Showtime TV series Dexter included two major menacing female love interests of the title character: Lila West and Hannah McKay, played by Jaime Murray and Yvonne Strahovski respetively. In the TV series Femme Fatales, actress Tanit Phoenix played Lilith, the host who introduced each episode Rod Serling-style and occasionally appeared within the narrative. In the Netflix TV series Orange Is the New Black, actress Laura Prepon played Alex Vause, a modern femme fatale, who led both men and women to their destruction.

Femmes fatales appear frequently in comic books. Notable examples include Batman's long-time nemesis Catwoman, who first appeared in comics in 1940; various adversaries of The Spirit, such as P'Gell; and Tomie Kawakami the titular character of the horror manga Tomie.

This stock character is also often found in the genres of opera and musical theatre, where she will traditionally have a mezzo, alto or contralto range, opposed to the ingénue's soprano, to symbolize the masculinity and lack of feminine purity. An example is Hélène from Natasha, Pierre and the Great Comet of 1812.

In more recent years, femmes fatales have been incorporated into video games, an example of which being Ada Wong in the Resident Evil video game series.

== Use in criminal trials ==
The term has been used by the media in connection with highly publicised criminal trials, such as the trials of Amanda Knox and Jodi Arias. Arias received the nickname "La Tueuse au visage d'ange" ("The Angel-Faced Killer") from the French media during her high-profile 2013 trial.

== See also ==
- Femme fragile
- Honey trapping
- Traumatic bonding
