= List of awards and nominations received by Anna Kendrick =

Anna Kendrick awards and nominations
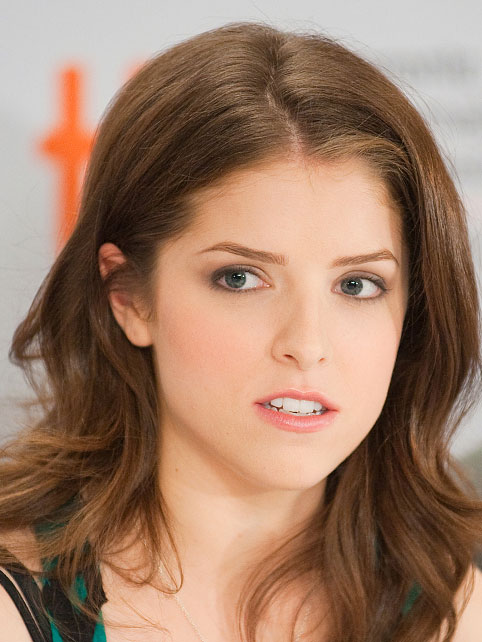
- Kendrick in 2009
Awards and nominations
Award	Wins	Nominations
Golden Globe	0	1
Academy Awards	0	1
BAFTA Awards	0	1
Emmy Awards	0	1
Independent Spirit Awards	0	2
MTV Movie & TV Awards	3	2
Screen Actors Guild Awards	0	1
Critics' Choice Movie Awards	0	3
Empire Awards	0	1
Nickelodeon Kids' Choice Awards	2	6
People's Choice Awards	0	5
Satellite Awards	1	1
Teen Choice Awards	5	7
Tony Awards	0	1

Totals (Note: Certain award groups do not simply award one winner. They acknowledge several different recipients, have runners-up, and have third place. Since this is a specific recognition and is different from losing an award, runner-up mentions are considered wins in this award tally. For simplification and to avoid errors, each award in this list has been presumed to have had a prior nomination.)
- Wins: 11
- Nominations: 33

This article is a List of awards and nominations received by Anna Kendrick.

Anna Kendrick is an American actress and singer known for her roles on stage and screen. She has received nominations for an Academy Awards, an Actor Award, a BAFTA Award, three Critics' Choice Awards, a Primetime Emmy Award, a Golden Globe Award, and a Tony Award.

On film, she took early roles in the musical comedy Camp (2003) and the comedy-drama Rocket Science (2008), each of which earned her Independent Spirit Award nominations. She received critical attention for her portrayal of a plucky ambitious young corporate downsizer in the Jason Reitman–directed comedy-drama film Up in the Air (2009), for which she earned nominations for the Academy Award for Best Supporting Actress, the Actor Award, the British Academy Film Award, the Critics' Choice Movie Award and the Golden Globe Award.

She portrayed Cinderella in the film adaptation of the Stephen Sondheim musical Into the Woods (2014) for which she was won the Satellite Award for Best Cast – Motion Picture and was nominated for the Critics' Choice Movie Award for Best Acting Ensemble.

On stage, she played a supporting role in the Broadway musical comedy High Society (1998), for which she earned a Theater World Award as well as nominations for the Tony Award for Best Featured Actress in a Musical and a Drama Desk Award for Outstanding Featured Actress in a Musical. On television, she played an aspiring writer in the Quibi short-form comedy series Dummy (2020), for which she was nominated for the Primetime Emmy Award for Outstanding Actress in a Short Form Comedy or Drama Series.

== Major associations ==
=== Academy Awards ===
Year	Category	Nominated work	Result	Ref.
2010	Best Supporting Actress	Up in the Air	Nominated	

=== Actor Awards ===
Year	Category	Nominated work	Result	Ref.
2010	Outstanding Actress in a Supporting Role	Up in the Air	Nominated	

=== BAFTA Awards ===
Year	Category	Nominated work	Result	Ref.
British Academy Film Awards
2010	Best Actress in a Supporting Role	Up in the Air	Nominated	

=== Critics' Choice Awards ===
Year	Category	Nominated work	Result	Ref.
Critics' Choice Movie Awards
2010	Best Cast (Note: Shared with the cast)	Up in the Air	Nominated	
2010	Best Supporting Actress	Up in the Air	Nominated	
2015	Best Acting Ensemble	Into the Woods	Nominated	

=== Emmy Awards ===
Year	Category	Nominated work	Result	Ref.
Primetime Emmy Awards
2020	Outstanding Actress in a Short Form Comedy or Drama Series	Dummy	Nominated	

=== Golden Globe Awards ===
Year	Category	Nominated work	Result	Ref.
2010	Best Supporting Actress – Motion Picture	Up in the Air	Nominated	

=== Tony Awards ===
Year	Category	Nominated work	Result	Ref.
1998	Best Featured Actress in a Musical	High Society	Nominated	

== Miscellaneous awards ==
Organizations	Year	Award	Category	Result	Ref.
Empire Awards	2010	Best Newcomer	Up in the Air / The Twilight Saga: New Moon	Nominated	
Independent Spirit Awards	2004	Best Debut Performance	Camp	Nominated	
Independent Spirit Awards	2008	Best Supporting Actress	Rocket Science	Nominated	
MTV Movie & TV Awards	2010	Best Breakthrough Performance	Up in the Air	Won	
MTV Movie & TV Awards	2013	Best Musical Moment (Note: Shared with Rebel Wilson, Anna Camp, Brittany Snow, Alexis Knapp, Ester Dean and Hana Mae Lee)	Pitch Perfect	Won	
MTV Movie & TV Awards	2016	Best Ensemble Cast	Pitch Perfect 2	Won	
MTV Movie & TV Awards	2016	Best Female Performance	Pitch Perfect 2	Nominated	
MTV Movie & TV Awards	2017	Best Kiss (Note: Shared with Zac Efron)	Mike and Dave Need Wedding Dates	Nominated	
Nickelodeon Kids' Choice Awards	2016	Favorite Movie Actress	Pitch Perfect 2	Nominated	
Nickelodeon Kids' Choice Awards	2017	Favorite Voice From an Animated Movie	Trolls	Nominated	
Nickelodeon Kids' Choice Awards	2017	Favorite Frenemies (Note: Shared with Justin Timberlake)	Trolls	Nominated	
Nickelodeon Kids' Choice Awards	2018	Favorite Movie Actress	Pitch Perfect 3	Nominated	
Nickelodeon Kids' Choice Awards	2021	Favorite Voice From an Animated Movie	Trolls World Tour	Won	
Nickelodeon Kids' Choice Awards	2024	Favorite Female Voice From an Animated Movie	Trolls Band Together	Won	
People's Choice Awards	2010	Favorite Breakout Movie Actress	Up in the Air	Nominated	
People's Choice Awards	2016	Favorite Comedic Movie Actress	Pitch Perfect 2	Nominated	
People's Choice Awards	2016	Favorite Social Media Celebrity	–	Nominated	
People's Choice Awards	2017	Favorite Comedic Movie Actress	Mike and Dave Need Wedding Dates	Nominated	
People's Choice Awards	2017	Favorite Movie Actress	The Accountant	Nominated	
Satellite Awards	2009	Best Supporting Actress – Motion Picture	Up in the Air	Nominated	
Satellite Awards	2015	Best Cast – Motion Picture	Into the Woods	Won	
Teen Choice Awards	2010	Choice Movie: Female Scene Stealer	The Twilight Saga: New Moon	Nominated	
Teen Choice Awards	2013	Choice Movie Actress: Comedy	Pitch Perfect	Nominated	
Teen Choice Awards	2013	Choice Movie Liplock (Note: Shared with Skylar Astin)	Pitch Perfect	Nominated	
Teen Choice Awards	2013	Choice Single: Female Artist	"Cups"	Nominated	
Teen Choice Awards	2015	Choice Movie – Chemistry (Note: Shared with Brittany Snow)	Pitch Perfect 2	Won	
Teen Choice Awards	2015	Choice Movie – Hissy Fit	Pitch Perfect 2	Won	
Teen Choice Awards	2015	Choice Movie Actress: Comedy	Pitch Perfect 2	Won	
Teen Choice Awards	2016	Choice Movie Actress: AnTEENcipated	The Hollars	Nominated	
Teen Choice Awards	2016	Choice Movie Actress: Comedy	Mr. Right	Nominated	
Teen Choice Awards	2017	Choice Movie Actress: Comedy	Table 19	Nominated	
Teen Choice Awards	2018	Choice Movie Actress: Comedy	Pitch Perfect 3	Won	
Teen Choice Awards	2018	Choice Twit	–	Won	

== Critics associations ==
Year	Association	Category	Work	Result	Ref.
1998	Theatre World Awards	–	High Society	Won	
1998	Drama Desk Awards	Outstanding Featured Actress in a Musical	High Society	Nominated	
2009	Austin Film Critics Association	Best Supporting Actress	Up in the Air	Won	
2009	Boston Society of Film Critics	Best Supporting Actress	Up in the Air	2nd place	
2009	Chicago Film Critics Association	Best Supporting Actress	Up in the Air	Nominated	
2009	Dallas–Fort Worth Film Critics Association	Best Supporting Actress	Up in the Air	2nd place	
2009	Detroit Film Critics Society	Best Supporting Actress	Up in the Air	Nominated	
2009	Houston Film Critics Society	Best Supporting Actress	Up in the Air	Won	
2009	Los Angeles Film Critics Association	Best Supporting Actress	Up in the Air	2nd place	
2009	National Board of Review	Best Supporting Actress	Up in the Air	Won	
2009	New York Film Critics Circle	Best Supporting Actress	Up in the Air	3rd place	
2009	San Diego Film Critics Society	Best Supporting Actress	Up in the Air	2nd place	
2009	St. Louis Gateway Film Critics Association	Best Supporting Actress	Up in the Air	Nominated	
2009	Toronto Film Critics Association	Best Supporting Actress	Up in the Air	Won	
2009	Washington D.C. Area Film Critics Association	Best Breakthrough Performance	Up in the Air	Nominated	
2009	Washington D.C. Area Film Critics Association	Best Ensemble Cast	Up in the Air	Nominated	
2009	Washington D.C. Area Film Critics Association	Best Supporting Actress	Up in the Air	Nominated	
2010	Irish Film & Television Academy	Best International Actress	Up in the Air	Nominated	
2010	National Society of Film Critics	Best Supporting Actress	Up in the Air	Nominated	
2010	Online Film Critics Society	Best Supporting Actress	Up in the Air	Nominated	
2010	Palm Springs International Film Festival	Rising Star Award	Up in the Air	Won	
2010	Vancouver Film Critics Circle	Best Supporting Actress	Up in the Air	Nominated	
2010	Detroit Film Critics Society	Best Ensemble	Scott Pilgrim vs. the World	Nominated	
2014	Detroit Film Critics Society	Best Ensemble	Into the Woods	Nominated	
2024	Palm Springs International Film Festival	Directors to Watch	Woman of the Hour	Won	
2024	Astra Film Awards	Best First Feature	Woman of the Hour	Won	
2024	San Diego Film Critics Society	Best First Feature (Director)	Woman of the Hour	Nominated	
2024	St. Louis Film Critics Association	Best First Feature	Woman of the Hour	Nominated	
2024	Toronto Film Critics Association	Best First Feature	Woman of the Hour	Won	
2024	Las Vegas Film Critics Society	Breakout Filmmaker of the Year	Woman of the Hour	Nominated	
2024	Online Film Critics Society	Best Debut Feature	Woman of the Hour	Nominated	
