= Scrappy Little Nobody =

Book by Anna Kendrick

- Author: Anna Kendrick
- Audio read by: Anna Kendrick
- Publisher: Touchstone Books, an imprint of Simon & Schuster
- Publication date: November 15, 2016
- Media type: Hardcover, audiobook, eBook
- ISBN: 978-1-5011-1720-6
- OCLC: 946903044
- Website: scrappylittlenobody.com; Scrappy Little Nobody at Google Books

Scrappy Little Nobody is a 2016 memoir by Anna Kendrick, comprising "a collection of autobiographical essays". An audiobook read by Kendrick was released along with the book. Kendrick said of the book: "My goals for this book were to make people laugh, to feel connected to people, and maybe get people to feel more connected to me." The book covers Kendrick's childhood in Maine, her Broadway career as a teenager, her film career, and performing and presenting at the Academy Awards.

== Reception ==
Alex McCown of The A.V. Club called Scrappy Little Nobody "worth reading", stating the book is "the tale of an unusual life and oddball persona rising to fame, and it's a damn entertaining one." Kirkus Reviews was more critical, saying that "her attempts at humor often fall flat", and that "Kendrick is a scrappy little somebody now, but she should stick to acting." Vogue described it as "a charming, funny and sometimes probing collection of personal essays." The Winnipeg Free Press complained that the book was "filled with one average anecdote after another", but praised how she was "beautifully candid about the struggles she went through regarding body image as a young, underdeveloped girl and the anxiety with which she continues to grapple". Susan Wloszczyna of Buffalo News called it a "semi-satisfying look at what happens when you become a relatively well-known performer at a young age."

In 2016, the book was second in the Goodreads Choice Awards with 23,353 votes in the Best Humor Category; the winner was The Girl with the Lower Back Tattoo by Amy Schumer.
