= Jesse Lee Soffer =

American actor

- Born: Ossining, New York, U.S.
- Education: The Gunnery
- Alma mater: New York University
- Occupations: Actor, director
- Years active: 1990–present

Jesse Lee Soffer is an American actor and television director. He is known for portraying Will Munson on the CBS soap opera As the World Turns, and received three Emmy nominations for his work on the show. From 2014 to 2022, he starred as Jay Halstead on the NBC drama Chicago P.D. and guest-starred on Chicago P.D. crossover episodes with Chicago Med and Chicago Fire, as part of the main cast. He is also known for his role as Bobby Brady in the comedy The Brady Bunch Movie and its sequel A Very Brady Sequel. In 2024, Soffer played Wesley "Wes" Mitchell, the new International Fly Team leader on the fourth season of CBS drama FBI: International, after the departure of Luke Kleintank, who played Scott Forester.

== Early life and education ==
Jesse Lee Soffer was born in Ossining, New York, to Jill Hindes (née Bruning) and Stan Soffer. His father died in 1993, when he was nine years old. Soffer has two younger half-sisters, Shayne and Jenna Hindes, from his mother's second marriage. He also has two older half-siblings from his father's first marriage, Craig and Melissa Soffer. Soffer spent part of his childhood in Tarrytown, New York, and later moved to Newtown, Connecticut, at age ten.

Soffer boarded at The Gunnery, graduating in 2003. He played soccer in school and was named to the all-star team (prep school category) during his senior season. He took classes at New York University (NYU).

== Career ==
Soffer's acting career began at age six when he landed a Kix cereal commercial. In 1993, at age eight, he made his feature film debut with John Goodman and Cathy Moriarty in the comedy Matinee.

In 1994, Soffer co-starred as Percival in the drama Safe Passage. In 1995, Soffer co-starred as Bobby Brady in the comedy The Brady Bunch Movie and reprised his role in A Very Brady Sequel a year later. Continuing the pattern of working with Oscar-calibre and A-list talent, Soffer starred as a runaway-turned-sleuth Jamie Kincaid in the TV movie From the Mixed-Up Files of Mrs. Basil E. Frankweiler. He worked with director Richard Shepard in the AMC TV movie The Royale. In 1998, Soffer was cast as Taylor Donovan with Mary-Kate and Ashley Olsen on the ABC sitcom Two of a Kind. He also originated the role of Max Nickerson on the CBS soap opera Guiding Light in 1999. After four months on the show, he left to focus on his studies.

After graduating from high school, Soffer returned to his television career. In 2004, he took over the role of troubled youth Will Munson on the CBS soap opera As the World Turns. He played the role until April 4, 2008. He was nominated three times for the Daytime Emmy Award for Outstanding Younger Actor in a Drama Series for his work on ATWT as well as a Soap Opera Digest Award nomination for Outstanding Younger Lead Actor in 2005. In 2007, Soffer returned to his film career and co-starred with Carly Schroeder in Davis Guggenheim's sports drama Gracie, based on a true story. In July 2010, Soffer reprised his role as Will Munson on As the World Turns. During his time on As the World Turns, he was cast in an episode of Dick Wolf's Law & Order: Special Victims Unit. However, he was unable to film due to a clash in filming commitments. In 2011, Soffer co-starred in the dystopian science fiction action thriller In Time.

Soffer guest-starred on a number of television series including CSI: Miami, The Mentalist and Rizzoli & Isles. In 2012, he co-starred with Jordana Spiro in the short-lived Fox medical drama The Mob Doctor as Nate Devlin, the streetwise brother of Dr. Grace Devlin (Spiro). Later that year, he co-starred as Travis Alexander in Lifetime's original movie Jodi Arias: Dirty Little Secret.

In June 2013, it was reported Soffer had joined the cast of the NBC police procedural drama Chicago P.D., the first spin-off show from the drama Chicago Fire as Det. Jay Halstead. Halstead was introduced in the second-season premiere of Chicago Fire. Chicago P.D. premiered on January 8, 2014. On March 19, 2014, NBC renewed the series for a second season. NBC officially announced that the second season would premiere on September 24, 2014. Soffer did his own stunts on the show.

On August 30, 2022, it was announced that season 10 of Chicago P.D. would be the last one for Soffer. His last appearance was on October 5, 2022, on episode 3. On October 20, 2022, Variety reported Soffer would be back to Chicago P.D. as a director. He directed episode 16 titled "Deadlocked", which aired on March 22, 2023, marking his directorial debut. In March 2024, it was announced that Soffer would direct another episode of Chicago P.D. He directed episode 12 titled "Inventory", which aired on May 15, 2024.

On June 20, 2024, Variety announced Soffer would join the cast of FBI: International for Season 4 as a new series regular after replacing Luke Kleintank, who played Scott Forrester, since its debut and left near the end of Season 3.

== Filmography ==
=== Actor ===
Film

Year	Film	Role	Other notes
1993	Matinee	Dennis Loomis	Credited as Jesse Lee
1993	The Silent Alarm	Boy	Short film
1994	Safe Passage	Percival, age 9 and 10	Credited as Jesse Lee
1995	The Brady Bunch Movie	Bobby Brady	Credited as Jesse Lee
1996	A Very Brady Sequel	Bobby Brady	Credited as Jesse Lee
2007	Gracie	Johnny Bowen	
2011	In Time	Webb	

=== Television ===
Year	Title	Role	Notes
1995	Wings	Bobby Brady	Episode: "A House to Die For" (credited as Jesse Lee)
1995	From the Mixed-Up Files of Mrs. Basil E. Frankweiler	Jamie Kincaid (James)	Television film (credited as Jesse Lee)
1996	The Royale	Billy	Television film (credited as Jesse Lee)
1998	Two of a Kind	Taylor Donovan	Recurring role; 6 episodes
1999	Guiding Light	Max Nickerson #1	Recurring role (credited as Jesse Lee)
2004–2008; 2010	As the World Turns	Will Munson	Regular role; 502 episodes
2008	The Awakening of Spring	Michael	Television film
2008	CSI: Miami	Shane Huntington	Episode: "And How Does That Make You Kill?"
2009	The Philanthropist	Dean Fitzsimmons	Episode: "San Diego"
2010	The Whole Truth	Young lover	Episode: "Young Love"
2011	The Mentalist	Alan Dinkler	Episode: "Strawberries and Cream: Part 1"
2011	Rizzoli & Isles	Jacob Wilson	Episode: "Remember Me"
2012–2013	The Mob Doctor	Nate Devlin	Main role; 13 Episodes
2013	Hatfields & McCoys	Patrick McCoy	Unaired pilot
2013	Jodi Arias: Dirty Little Secret	Travis Alexander	Television film
2013–2022, 2026	Chicago Fire	Detective Jay Halstead	Recurring role; 19 episodes
2014–2015	Law & Order: Special Victims Unit	Detective Jay Halstead	Guest role; 2 episodes
2014–2023, 2026	Chicago P.D.	Detective Jay Halstead	Main role; 190 Episodes
2015–2022, 2026	Chicago Med	Detective Jay Halstead	Recurring role; 29 episodes
2024–2025	FBI: International	Supervisory Special Agent Wesley ‘Wes’ Mitchell	Main role (season 4)

=== Director ===
Year	Title	Notes
2023–2025	Chicago P.D.	Season 10, Episode 16: "Deadlocked"; Season 11, Episode 12: "Inventory"; Season 13, Episode 2: "Open Wounds"

== Awards and nominations ==
- Daytime Emmy Award nomination, Outstanding Younger Actor in a Drama Series (2006, 2007, 2008)
