= Murder of Travis Alexander =

2008 murder of an American man in Mesa, Arizona

- The victim, Travis Alexander, before 2008
- Location: 33.347099°N 111.587186°W; Mesa, Arizona, U.S.
- Date: June 4, 2008; 18 years ago
- Attack type: Murder by stabbing, slashing, shooting
- Weapons: Knife, gun (missing)
- Victim: Travis Victor Alexander (aged 30)
- Perpetrator: Jodi Ann Arias
- Verdict: Guilty
- Convictions: First-degree murder
- Sentence: Life imprisonment without the possibility of parole

Travis Victor Alexander (July 28, 1977 – June 4, 2008) was an American salesman who was murdered by his ex-girlfriend, Jodi Ann Arias (born July 9, 1980), in his house in Mesa, Arizona, United States, while in the shower. Arias was convicted of first-degree murder on May 8, 2013, and sentenced to life in prison without the possibility of parole on April 13, 2015. (Note: In the State of Arizona, a sentence of natural life requires that the defendant be incarcerated for the rest of their natural lifespan, with no possibility of parole or early release.)

Alexander sustained 27 stab wounds, a slit throat and a single gunshot wound to the forehead. Arias testified that she killed him in self-defense, but she was convicted by the jury of first-degree murder. During the sentencing phase, the jury deadlocked on the death penalty option, and Arias was sentenced to life imprisonment without the possibility of parole. Alexander's death and the subsequent investigation and trial attracted widespread media coverage in the United States.

== Background ==
=== Travis Victor Alexander ===
Alexander was born on July 28, 1977 in Riverside, California, to Gary David Alexander and Pamela Elizabeth (Morgan) Alexander. He had three brothers and four sisters. At the age of eight, he moved in with his paternal grandparents. After his father's death in July 1997, his seven siblings were also taken in by their paternal grandmother. Alexander told a friend that, prior to joining an LDS church, he would frequently engage in fights. He performed stand-up comedy under the alter ego "Eddie Snell". Alexander was a salesman and motivational speaker for Pre-Paid Legal Services (PPL).

=== Jodi Ann Arias ===
Arias was born on July 9, 1980, in Salinas, California, to William "Bill" Angelo Arias and Sandra Dee (Allen) Arias. At the age of twelve, Arias and her family moved to Yreka, California. She attended school until 11th grade, at which point she dropped out of Yreka Union High School. As a young adult, Arias ventured through her early 20s as an aspiring photographer and worked other odd jobs as a model, waitress, and hospitality worker until she got a sales position with PPL. Arias and Alexander met in 2006 at a work conference in Las Vegas, Nevada. Arias converted to the Church of Jesus Christ of Latter-day Saints, of which Alexander was a member, and was baptized by him on November 26, 2006 in a ceremony in Southern California. Alexander and Arias began dating in February 2007, and Arias moved to Mesa to live closer to Alexander, but in April 2008, she moved back to Yreka and lived there with her maternal grandparents. Alexander and Arias dated intermittently for a year and a half, in a long-distance relationship fashion, chatting with each other on the phone for hours at night, partaking in frequent phone sex as well as taking turns traveling between their respective Arizona and California homes.

Alexander's friends who knew Arias and observed them together reportedly had a negative opinion of her, stating that the relationship was unusually tumultuous and that Arias' behavior was worrying.

== Murder ==
Alexander was murdered at his house in Mesa, Arizona on Wednesday, June 4, 2008 while taking a shower. He sustained 27 stab wounds, a slit throat, and a gunshot wound to the head. Medical examiner Kevin Horn later testified that Alexander's jugular vein, common carotid artery, and trachea were slashed and that he had defensive wounds on his hands. Horn further testified that Alexander might have been dead when the gunshot was inflicted and that the cluster of stab wounds on his upper back were shallow. Alexander's death was ruled a homicide. He was buried at Riverside, California’s Olivewood Memorial Park cemetery.

== Discovery and investigation ==
Perpetrator Jodi Arias

Alexander missed an important conference call on the evening of June 4. The following day, Arias met Ryan Burns in the Salt Lake City suburb of West Jordan and attended business meetings for the conference. Burns later said that he noticed that Arias's formerly blonde hair was now dark brown and that she had cuts on her hands. On June 6, she left Salt Lake City and drove west toward California in a vehicle rented from Budget Rent-A-Car. She called Alexander several times and left several voicemail messages for him. She also accessed his cell-phone voicemail system. When Arias returned the car on June 7, it had been driven about 2,800 miles (4,500 km). The rental clerk testified that the car was missing its floor mats and had red stains on its front and rear seats. However, it could not be verified that the car had floor mats when Arias had picked it up, and the red stains could not be analyzed as the car had been cleaned before police could examine it.

On June 9, having been unable to reach Alexander, a concerned group of friends went to his home. His roommates had not seen him for several days, but they believed that he was out of town and thus did not suspect that anything was amiss. After finding a key to Alexander's bedroom, the group entered and found large pools of blood in the hallway to the master bathroom and Alexander's body in the shower. In the 9-1-1 call (not heard by the jury), the dispatcher asked whether Alexander had been suicidal or if anyone was angry enough to hurt him. Alexander's friends mentioned Arias by name as a possible suspect, stating that Alexander had told them that she had been stalking him, accessing his Facebook account, and slashing his car's tires.

While searching Alexander's home, police found his recently purchased digital camera damaged in the washing machine. Police were able to recover deleted images showing Arias and Alexander in sexually suggestive poses taken at approximately 1:40 p.m. on June 4. The final photograph of Alexander alive, showing him in the shower, was taken at 5:29 p.m. that day. Photos taken moments later show an individual believed to be Alexander "profusely bleeding" on the bathroom floor. A bloody palm print was discovered along the wall in the bathroom hallway; it contained DNA from both Arias and Alexander.

On July 9, 2008, Arias was indicted by a grand jury in Maricopa County, Arizona for the first-degree murder of Alexander. She was arrested at her home six days later and was extradited to Arizona on September 5. Arias pleaded not guilty on September 11. During this time, she provided several different accounts about her involvement in Alexander's death. She first told police that she had not been in Mesa on the day of the murder and had last seen Alexander in March 2008. On her second day of interrogation, Arias admitted she had been in Mesa, and that two intruders had broken into Alexander's home, murdering him and attacking her. Two years after her arrest, Arias retracted her story of the two intruders and said instead that she had killed Alexander in self-defense, stating she had been a victim of domestic violence.

== Criminal action ==
=== Pre-trial ===
On April 6, 2009, a motion to reconsider the defendant's motion to disqualify the Maricopa County District Attorney's office was denied. On May 18, the court ordered Arias to submit to IQ and competency testing. In January 2011, a defense filing detailed Arias's attorneys' efforts to obtain text messages and emails. The prosecution initially told defense attorneys that no text messages sent or received by Alexander were available, but the prosecution was then ordered to turn over several hundred such messages. Mesa police detective Esteban Flores told defense attorneys that there was nothing out of the ordinary among Alexander's emails; about 8,000 were turned over to the defense in June 2009.

=== Trial ===
Arias was represented by appointed counsel L. Kirk Nurmi and Jennifer Willmott.

The State of Arizona vs. Jodi Ann Arias
- Court: Superior Court of the State of Arizona in and for the County of Maricopa
- Decided: May 8, 2013
- Verdict: Guilty on one count of first-degree premeditated murder

Case history
- Subsequent actions: During the penalty phase, a mistrial was declared due to a hung jury. Arias was eventually sentenced to life in prison without the possibility of parole on April 13, 2015.

Court membership
- Judge sitting: Sherry K. Stephens

==== Jury selection ====
The trial commenced in Maricopa County Superior Court before Judge Sherry K. Stephens. The voir dire proceedings began on December 10, 2012. On December 20, Arias's attorneys argued that the prosecution was "systematically excluding" women and black people; prosecutor Juan Martinez said that race and sex were irrelevant to his decisions to strike certain jurors. Stephens ruled that the prosecution had shown no bias in the jury selection.

==== Guilt phase ====
In opening arguments on January 2, 2013, the prosecution portrayed Arias as a jealous person who attacked Alexander, a "good man," after he attempted to end their relationship. Arias' defense, conversely, said that Alexander had been violent and abusive, and that Arias had killed him only after he had "lunged at [her] in anger."

The prosecution alleged that Arias had premeditated the murder. They contended that Arias had staged a robbery at her grandparents' residence, where she was staying, in order to take a handgun to kill Alexander. A police detective who investigated the putative robbery testified that the gun was of the same caliber (.25 ACP) used in Alexander's shooting. They said that Arias had used a gas can and purchased gas in advance in order to hide her trip to Alexander's. The prosecution called Ryan Burns, who testified Arias was acting "normal[ly]" when she visited him the day after Alexander's death. Burns said that Arias told him that she had cut her hands on broken glass while working at a restaurant called Margaritaville, though a detective later testified that no such restaurant existed. Arias took the stand in her own defense on February 4, 2013, testifying for a total of 18 days, a duration described by criminal defense attorney Mark Geragos as "unprecedented". Arias detailed the abuse she had suffered at the hands of her parents and described her sex life with Alexander. A phone sex tape was played in court in which Alexander described wanting to tie Arias to a tree and sodomize her, and Arias responded, "[T]hat is so debasing; I like it." Arias testified that Alexander harbored pedophilic desires and that she tried to help him with those urges. She also said that her relationship with Alexander became increasingly physically and emotionally abusive. After detailing one argument in which she held out her hand to block Alexander from kicking her, she held up her left hand in the courtroom, showing that her ring finger was crooked. Arias said that she killed Alexander in self-defense after he had attacked her when she dropped his camera, forcing her to fight for her life.

Alyce LaViolette, a psychotherapist who specializes in domestic violence, testified for the defense that Arias was a victim of domestic abuse, and that most victims do not tell anyone because they feel ashamed and humiliated. During LaViolette's testimony, the defense team alluded to email between Alexander and his friends, Chris and Sky Hughes. The defense tried to enter the emails into evidence, but the trial judge ruled that they were hearsay. A court filing revealed the contents of some of the emails the DV expert alluded to, including one in which Alexander expressed anger that Hughes had discouraged Arias from romantically pursuing Alexander. In a response email, Chris Hughes said that he believed that Arias "would be [Travis's] next victim ... and that [she] was just another girl [Travis] was playing." Alexander allegedly responded by saying, "I am a bit of a sociopath." Hughes testified during the trial, saying that, while he knew Alexander was seeing multiple women, he and his wife had been manipulated by Arias, and that they had had a falling out with Arias just months after the emails when they twice caught her eavesdropping on their conversations with Alexander. The prosecution called rebuttal witnesses, included several of Alexander's other girlfriends, who stated that they had never seen him exhibit problems with anger or violence.

Beginning on March 14, psychologist Richard Samuels testified for the defense for nearly six days. He said that Arias had likely been suffering from acute stress at the time of the murder, sending her body into a "fight or flight" mode to defend herself, which caused her brain to stop retaining memory. In response to a juror's question asking whether this scenario could occur even if this was a premeditated murder, as the prosecution contended, he responded: "Is it possible? Yes. Is it probable? No." Samuels also diagnosed Arias with posttraumatic stress disorder (PTSD). Martinez attacked Samuels' credibility, accusing him of bias and of having formed a relationship with Arias; Samuels had previously testified that he had compassion for Arias. The Arizona Court of Appeals later castigated Martinez's impeachment of Samuels as improper. In rebuttal, prosecution witness Janeen DeMarte, a clinical psychologist, testified that Arias was not a victim of abuse and did not have PTSD, diagnosing her, instead, with borderline personality disorder. In response to DeMarte's testimony, the defense asked for and received permission to call a rebuttal witness, psychologist Robert Geffner, who said that all tests taken by Arias since her arrest pointed toward an anxiety disorder stemming from trauma. Geffner also suggested that the Minnesota Multiphasic Personality Inventory (MMPI) that DeMarte had used was not geared towards detecting personality disorders, suggesting that DeMarte should have used the Millon Clinical Multiaxial Inventory, which Samuels had used. The prosecution's final rebuttal witness, forensic neuropsychologist Jill Hayes, disputed Geffner's testimony that the MMPI test was not geared toward diagnosing borderline personality disorder.

In closing arguments, Martinez accused Arias of being a manipulative liar, showed a text that Alexander had sent calling Arias "evil", again displayed the gruesome crime-scene photographs, and said that Arias had attempted to manipulate the jury. Arias' defense asked the jury to put aside any personal dislike they may have had for Arias, and said that the prosecution's premeditation theory "[didn't] make any sense," contending that Arias' behavior—including appearing on security cameras, preserving receipts from gas cans she purchased, and spending the night at Alexander's before the killing—were inconsistent with the notion that she was on a "covert mission". In rebuttal, Martinez reemphasized the extent and variety of Alexander's wounds, calling the killing "a slaughter".

Three jurors were dismissed through the course of the trial—one for misconduct, one for health-related reasons, and one after being arrested for a DUI offense. At the close of arguments, jurors were instructed that they could find Arias guilty of first degree murder if each of them, individually, found that she had premeditated the murder or had caused the death while committing a felony. On May 8, 2013, after 15 hours of deliberation, Arias was found guilty of first-degree murder. All twelve jurors found her guilty of first-degree premeditated murder; seven of the twelve jurors determined she was guilty of felony murder. As the verdict was read, Alexander's family smiled and hugged one another. Crowds outside the courtroom began cheering and chanting.

==== Aggravation phase ====
Following the conviction, the prosecution was required to convince the jury that the murder was "cruel, heinous, or depraved" for them to determine that Arias was eligible for the death penalty. The aggravation phase of the trial started on May 15, 2013. The only witness was the medical examiner who had performed Alexander's autopsy. Arias's attorneys, who had repeatedly asked to step down from the case, provided only brief opening statements and closing arguments in which they said that the adrenaline rushing through Alexander's body may have prevented him from feeling much pain during his death. Prosecutor Martinez showed photos of the corpse and crime scene to the jury, then paused for two minutes of silence to illustrate how long he claimed that it took for Alexander to die. After less than three hours of consideration, the jury determined that Arias was eligible for the death penalty.

==== Penalty phase ====
The penalty phase began on May 16, 2013, when prosecutors called Alexander's family members to offer victim impact statements in an effort to convince the jury that Arias's crime merited a death sentence.

On May 21, Arias offered an allocution, during which she pleaded for a life sentence. Arias acknowledged that her plea for life was a reversal of remarks that she made to a television reporter shortly after her conviction in which she had said that she preferred the death penalty. "Each time I said that, I meant it, but I lacked perspective," she said. "Until very recently, I could not imagine standing before you and asking you to give me life." She said that she changed her mind to avoid bringing more pain to members of her family, who were in the courtroom. At one point, Arias held up a white T-shirt with the word "Survivor" written across it, telling the jurors that she would sell the clothing and donate all proceeds to victims of domestic abuse. She also said that she would donate her hair to Locks of Love while in prison, and had already done so three times while in jail. That evening, in a joint jailhouse interview with The Arizona Republic, KPNX-TV and NBC's Today, Arias said that she did not know whether the jury would decide on life or death. "Whatever they come back with I will have to deal with it; I have no other choice." Regarding the verdict, she said, "It felt like a huge sense of unreality. I felt betrayed, actually, by the jury. I was hoping they would see things for what they are. I felt really awful for my family and what they were thinking."

On May 23, the sentencing phase of Arias' trial resulted in a hung jury, prompting the judge to declare a mistrial for that phase. The jury had reached an 8–4 decision in favor of the death penalty. After the jury was discharged, jury foreman Zervakos stated that the jury found the responsibility of weighing the death sentence overwhelming, but were horrified when their efforts ended in a mistrial. "By the end of it, we were mentally and emotionally exhausted," he said. "I think we were horrified when we found out that they had actually called a mistrial, and we felt like we had failed."

On May 30, Maricopa County Attorney Bill Montgomery said he was confident that an impartial jury could be seated, but that it was possible that lawyers and the victim's family could agree to scrap the trial in favor of a life sentence with no parole. The defense responded, "If the diagnosis made by the State's psychologist is correct, the Maricopa County Attorney's Office is seeking to impose the death penalty upon a mentally ill woman who has no prior criminal history. It is not incumbent upon Ms. Arias'[s] defense counsel to resolve this case." And Arias, while reaffirming her belief in the criminal justice system, questioned whether an impartial jury could be seated in light of the coverage of the trial.

==== Mistrial motions and mid-trial appeal ====
During the trial, defense attorneys filed for mistrial in January, April and May 2013. Arias's lawyers argued in January that Esteban Flores, the lead Mesa police detective on the case, perjured himself during a 2009 pretrial hearing aimed at determining whether the death penalty should be considered an option for jurors. Flores testified at the 2009 hearing that based on his own review of the scene and a discussion with the medical examiner, it was apparent that Alexander had been shot in the forehead first. Contrary to Flores' testimony at the 2009 hearing, the medical examiner told jurors the gunshot probably would have incapacitated Alexander. Given his extensive defense wounds, including stab marks and slashes to his hands, arms and legs, it was not likely the shot came first. Flores denied perjury and said during his trial testimony that he just misunderstood what the medical examiner told him.

On May 20, 2013, defense attorneys filed motion that alleged that a defense witness who had been due to testify the preceding Friday, the 17th, began receiving death threats for her scheduled testimony on Arias's behalf. The day before the filing, the witness contacted counsel for Arias, stating that she was no longer willing to testify because of the threats. The motion continued, "It should also be noted that these threats follow those made to Alyce LaViolette, a record of which was made ex-parte and under seal." The motion was denied, as was a motion for a stay in the proceedings that had been sought to give time to appeal the decisions to the Arizona Supreme Court.

On May 29, 2013, the Arizona Supreme Court declined to hear an appeal filed three months earlier, which was also refused by the mid-level Arizona Court of Appeals. Nurmi had asked the high court to throw out the aggravating factor of cruelty because the judge had allowed it to go forward based on a different theory of how the murder occurred. The lead detective originally claimed that the gunshot occurred first, followed by the stabbing and slitting of the throat. Based on that theory, Stephens ruled there was probable cause to find the crime had been committed in an especially cruel manner, an aggravating factor under state law. Subsequent to this initial hearing, the medical examiner testified that the gunshot occurred postmortem.

==== Sentencing retrial and incarceration ====
On October 21, 2014, Arias's sentencing retrial began. Opening statements were given, and a hearing on evidence was held. Prosecution witness Amanda Webb, called in the first trial to rebut Arias's testimony that she returned a gas can to Walmart on May 8, 2007, admitted she did not know if all records were transferred after the store relocated. After a holiday break, the retrial resumed in January, 2015. Mesa police experts admitted that Alexander's laptop had viruses and pornography, contrary to testimony in the first trial in 2013. Jury deliberations began on February 12, 2015.

On March 2, 2015, the jury informed Judge Stephens that they were deadlocked. Arias's attorneys requested a mistrial. Stephens denied the request, read additional instructions to the jury, and ordered them to resume deliberations. On March 5, 2015, Stephens declared a mistrial because the jurors, who deliberated for about 26 hours over five days, deadlocked at 11–1 vote in favor of the death penalty. The 11 jurors in favor of death tried, unsuccessfully, to get the holdout juror removed from the jury, arguing that juror was biased. After the result, the holdout juror reported that she received threats, and her name, address, and phone number were leaked online. Dennis Elias, a jury consultant, said "The very fact that people are making death threats and trying to out her, it is not a proud day for any single one of those people and they should be ashamed." Maricopa County Attorney Bill Montgomery released a statement calling for the attacks on the juror to "cease".

Sentencing was scheduled for April 7, 2015, with Stephens having the option to sentence Arias to either life imprisonment without the possibility of parole or with the possibility of parole after 25 years. On April 13, Stephens sentenced Arias to life imprisonment without the possibility of parole. By March 5, 2015, Arias' trials cost an estimated $3 million.

In June 2015, following a restitution hearing, Arias was ordered to pay more than $32,000 to Alexander's siblings. Her attorney stated this was about one third of the amount requested.

As of 2026, Arias is housed at the Arizona Department of Corrections #281129, which is located at Arizona State Prison Complex - Perryville. She started her sentence in the complex's maximum-security Lumley Unit, but has since been downgraded to the medium-security level.

=== Post-verdict appeal ===
On July 6, 2018, Arias's attorneys filed an appeal against her conviction. The appeal claimed that the level of media coverage in the case, and misconduct from the prosecution, prevented Arias from receiving a fair trial. In 2020 the appeals court ruled that despite "egregious" prosecutorial misconduct, the conviction should be upheld as it was based on "overwhelming evidence of [Arias's] guilt". Arias requested that the Arizona Supreme Court review the case; in November 2020 the court declined it.

== Media ==
The Associated Press reported that the public would be able to watch testimony in the Jodi Arias trial. This decision, made by a three-judge panel of the Arizona Court of Appeals, overruled Maricopa County Superior Court Judge Sherry Stephens' original decision, which would "allow a witness to testify in private, as jurors [weighed] whether to give [Arias] the death penalty." Judge Stephens held secret (non-public) hearings. As a result of the move for secrecy, an unidentified defense witness was permitted to testify in private. Though Judge Stephens' decision had been overruled by the Arizona Court of Appeals, "the mystery witness who testified ... at the start of the defense case" was not revealed to the public.

The case, featured on an episode of 48 Hours Mystery: Picture Perfect in 2008, included an interview which, for the first time in the history of 48 Hours, was used as evidence in a death penalty trial. On September 24, 2008, Inside Edition interviewed Arias at the Maricopa County Jail where she stated, "No jury is going to convict me...because I am innocent and you can mark my words on that. No jury is going to convict me."

The Associated Press said the case was a "circus," a "runaway train" and said the case "grew into a worldwide sensation as thousands followed the trial via a live, unedited Web feed." They added that the trial garnered "daily coverage from cable news networks and spawned a virtual cottage industry for talk shows" and at the courthouse, "the entire case devolved into a circus-like spectacle attracting dozens of enthusiasts each day to the courthouse as they lined up for a chance to score just a few open public seats in the gallery;" "For its fans, the Arias trial became a live daytime soap opera." The Toronto Star stated, "With its mix of jealousy, religion, murder, and sex, the Jodi Arias case shows what happens when the justice system becomes entertainment."

During the trial, public figures freely expressed their opinions. Arizona Governor Jan Brewer told reporters after an unrelated press event that she believed Arias to be guilty. She sidestepped a question about whether she believed Arias was guilty of manslaughter, second-degree murder or first-degree murder, but said "I don't have all the information, but I think she's guilty." After the trial, jury foreman William Zervakos told ABC's Good Morning America that Arias' long testimony had hampered her defense: "I think eighteen days hurt her. I think she was not a good witness."

HLN sent out a press release titled "HLN No. 1 Among Ad-Supported Cable as Arias Pleads for Her Life," bragging that they led in the ratings. The release stated: "HLN continues to be the ratings leader and complete source for coverage of the Jodi Arias Trial. On May 21, HLN ranked No.1 among ad-supported cable networks from 1:56p to 2:15p (ET) as Arias took the stand to plead for her life in front of the jury that found her guilty of Alexander's murder. During that time period, HLN out-delivered the competition among both total viewers (2,540,000) and 25–54 demo viewers (691,000). HLN also ranked No.1 among ad-supported cable networks for the 2p hour delivering 2,227,000 total viewers and 620,000 25–54 viewers."

=== Social media ===
In late January 2013, artwork drawn by Arias began selling on eBay. The seller was her brother; he claimed that the profits went towards covering the family's travel expenses to the trial and "better food" for Arias while she was in jail. On April 11, USA Today reported that during the testimony of defense witness Alyce LaViolette, public outrage was extreme concerning her assertions that Arias was a victim of domestic violence. Tweets and other social media posts attacked LaViolette's reputation. More than 500 negative reviews of LaViolette's yet-to-be-released book appeared on Amazon.com calling LaViolette a fraud and a disgrace. "It's the electronic version of a lynch mob," said retired Maricopa County Superior Court Judge Kenneth Fields. Attorney Anne Bremner, who said she received death threats after she provided legal counsel in the Amanda Knox case, told The Huffington Post that the kind of online ridicule and threats LaViolette received could affect attorneys and witnesses in high-profile trials. "It's something to take into account," Bremner said. "If I had kids I would consider it even more so."

On May 9, The Republic commented: "The Jodi Arias trial has been a social-media magnet. And when Arias was convicted Wednesday of first-degree murder, Twitter and Facebook exploded with reaction. Much of it was aimed at Arias, though plenty of people tweeted at the media coverage, such as the antics of HLN host Nancy Grace. During the trial, hardcore followers of the proceedings were accused of trying to use social media to intimidate witnesses, or otherwise influence the outcome. Whether it had any effect is questionable, but it's a notable development."

On May 24, Victoria Washington, who was one of Arias's attorneys until she had to resign in 2011 because of a conflict, said Arias's lead attorney, Nurmi, "was pilloried in social media. At one point, an Internet denizen digitally superimposed his face onto a crime-scene photo of Alexander dead in the shower of his Mesa home. I know people were aggravated with him constantly filing for mistrial, but you have to make and preserve the record for federal review (on appeal). If you don't file for mistrial, the appeals courts will say you waived it."

On May 28, Radar Online reported the jury foreman had been receiving threats ever since the panel deadlocked on the sentencing phase, and now the foreman's son was claiming that the foreman was receiving death threats. "Today I read hate mail my dad had gotten. Some person had sent him a threatening message complete with his email address, full name, and phone number (which at the very least means that this guy should retake Hate Mail 101). I also read some comments on an article online about my dad. Surreal. They say my dad was fooled by the defendant, that he was taken with her, that he hated the prosecutor," the foreman's son wrote on his public blog.

In an interview on April 8, 2015, Arias' attorney Jennifer Willmott discussed the social media furor, death threats she received, Arias' statements at the sentencing, the holdout juror, and stated that she believed that Arias testified truthfully.

The Twitter account in Arias' name is operated by Arias' friends on her behalf. On June 22, 2013, from that account, Arias tweeted, "Just don't know yet if I will plea or appeal." In a 2026 blogpost, Arias claimed that detectives working on her case had lost or destroyed evidence, and that she was preparing a new appeal that would argue that her constitutional rights had been violated during her original trial.

== Adaptations ==
Jodi Arias: Dirty Little Secret, a made-for-television movie, stars Lost actress Tania Raymonde as Arias and Jesse Lee Soffer, of The Mob Doctor and Chicago P.D., as Alexander. Prosecutor Juan Martinez was played by Ugly Betty actor Tony Plana and David Zayas, of Dexter, portrays detective Esteban Flores. Created for and distributed by the Lifetime Network, the film premiered June 22, 2013.

On January 21, 2023, Lifetime released another Jodi Arias movie titled Bad Behind Bars: Jodi Arias which stars Celina Sinden as Jodi Arias, Tricia Black as Donovan Bering, and Lynn Rafferty as Tracy Brown.

== See also ==
- Attorney–client privilege
- Courtroom photography and broadcasting
- Trial by media
- Crime in Arizona
- Murder of Dale Harrell
- Murder of Ryan Poston
