= Anna Kendrick =

American actress (born 1985)

- Kendrick at the 2026 Toronto International Film Festival
- Born: Anna Cooke Kendrick; August 9, 1985 (age 41); Portland, Maine, U.S.
- Occupations: Actress; singer
- Years active: 1998–present
- Awards: Full list

Anna Cooke Kendrick (born August 9, 1985) is an American actress, singer, and film director. Known for playing upbeat and endearing characters in comedies and musicals, her accolades include nominations for an Academy Award, a Primetime Emmy Award and a Tony Award.

Kendrick's first starring role was in the 1998 Broadway musical High Society, for which she earned a nomination for the Tony Award for Best Featured Actress in a Musical. She made her film debut in the musical comedy Camp (2003) and had a supporting role in The Twilight Saga (2008–2011). She achieved wider recognition for the comedy-drama film Up in the Air (2009), which earned her a nomination for the Academy Award for Best Supporting Actress, and for her starring role in the Pitch Perfect film series (2012–2017).

She starred in the comedies Scott Pilgrim vs. the World (2010) and 50/50 (2011), the crime drama End of Watch (2012), the musical Into the Woods (2014), the thrillers The Accountant (2016) and A Simple Favor (2018), and the fantasy comedy Noelle (2019). She has voiced the lead role in the animated musicals of the Trolls film franchise since 2016. She starred in the short form comedy series Dummy (2020), for which she received a nomination for a Primetime Emmy Award for Outstanding Actress. She made her directorial debut with the self-starring thriller Woman of the Hour (2023).

Kendrick sang on soundtracks for some of her films, including the single "Cups" in 2012, and at events including the 2013 Kennedy Center Honors, and the 2015 Academy Awards. Her memoir, Scrappy Little Nobody, was published in 2016.

== Early life ==
Kendrick was born on August 9, 1985, in Portland, Maine. Her mother, Janice, is an accountant. Her father, William, was a history teacher. She is of English, Irish, and Scottish descent.

She began performing in community theater at the age of six. Her older brother, Michael (b. 1983), is also an actor; he appeared in the drama film Looking for an Echo (2000). Her parents divorced when she was 15 years old. She attended Deering High School.

== Career ==
=== 1998–2007: Early career, theater, hiatus and film debut ===
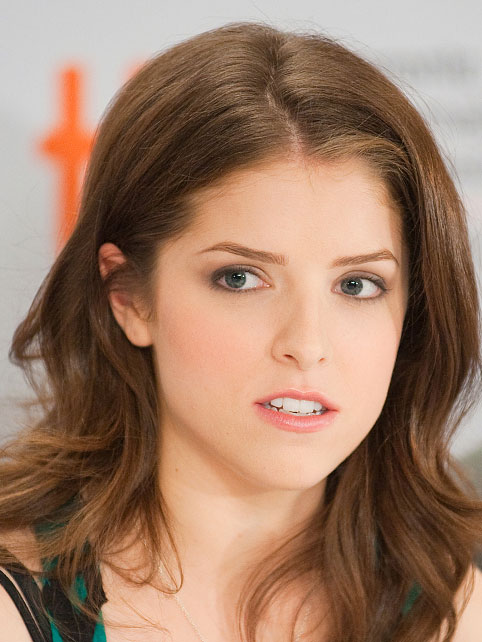
Kendrick at the 2009 Toronto International Film Festival

Kendrick started her career at age 12 in a supporting role in the 1998 Broadway musical High Society, which earned her a Theater World Award and nominations for Featured Actress in a Musical at the Drama Desk Awards and Tony Awards. She went on to a supporting role in the 2003 New York City Opera production of Stephen Sondheim's musical A Little Night Music.

Her film debut in the musical Camp as nerdy Fritzi Wagner earned her a nomination for the Independent Spirit Award for Best Debut Performance. After a hiatus of three years Kendrick played an ambitious high school debater in Rocket Science (2007), earning an Independent Spirit Award nomination for Best Supporting Female.

=== 2008–2011: Twilight and Up in the Air ===
Kendrick rose to prominence in 2008 for the fantasy romance Twilight, a major box-office hit based on Stephenie Meyer's 2005 novel of the same name; Kendrick played Jessica Stanley, a friend of protagonist Bella Swan. In 2009, she appeared in the comedy The Marc Pease Experience, in her first leading role in the crime thriller Elsewhere, and reprised her Jessica Stanley role in Twilight's sequel, New Moon.

She then starred alongside George Clooney in director Jason Reitman's Up in the Air (2009). Critics praised her performance as an ambitious college graduate, saying that she "grabs every scene she's in". It brought her nominations for several Best Supporting Actress awards, including the Academy Awards, Golden Globe Awards, Screen Actors Guild Awards and BAFTA Awards. Kendrick has been a member of the Actors' Branch of the Academy of Motion Picture Arts and Sciences since 2010.

In 2010, Kendrick again portrayed Jessica Stanley in the Twilight saga's third installment, Eclipse. Later that year, she appeared in Scott Pilgrim vs. the World, as the sister of the title character. The film did not fare well at the box office, but has since become a cult classic. In 2011, she appeared in the critically acclaimed comedy-drama 50/50, as an inexperienced therapist to a cancer patient played by Joseph Gordon-Levitt. Later that year, she made her final appearance as Jessica Stanley in Twilight's fourth installment, Breaking Dawn – Part 1 (2011).

=== 2012–2015: Pitch Perfect and Into the Woods ===
In 2012, Kendrick featured as part of the ensemble cast of What to Expect When You're Expecting, loosely based on the pregnancy guide of the same name. Also that year, she lent her voice to the stop-motion animated film ParaNorman, starred in the commercially successful crime drama End of Watch, and appeared in Robert Redford's political thriller The Company You Keep.

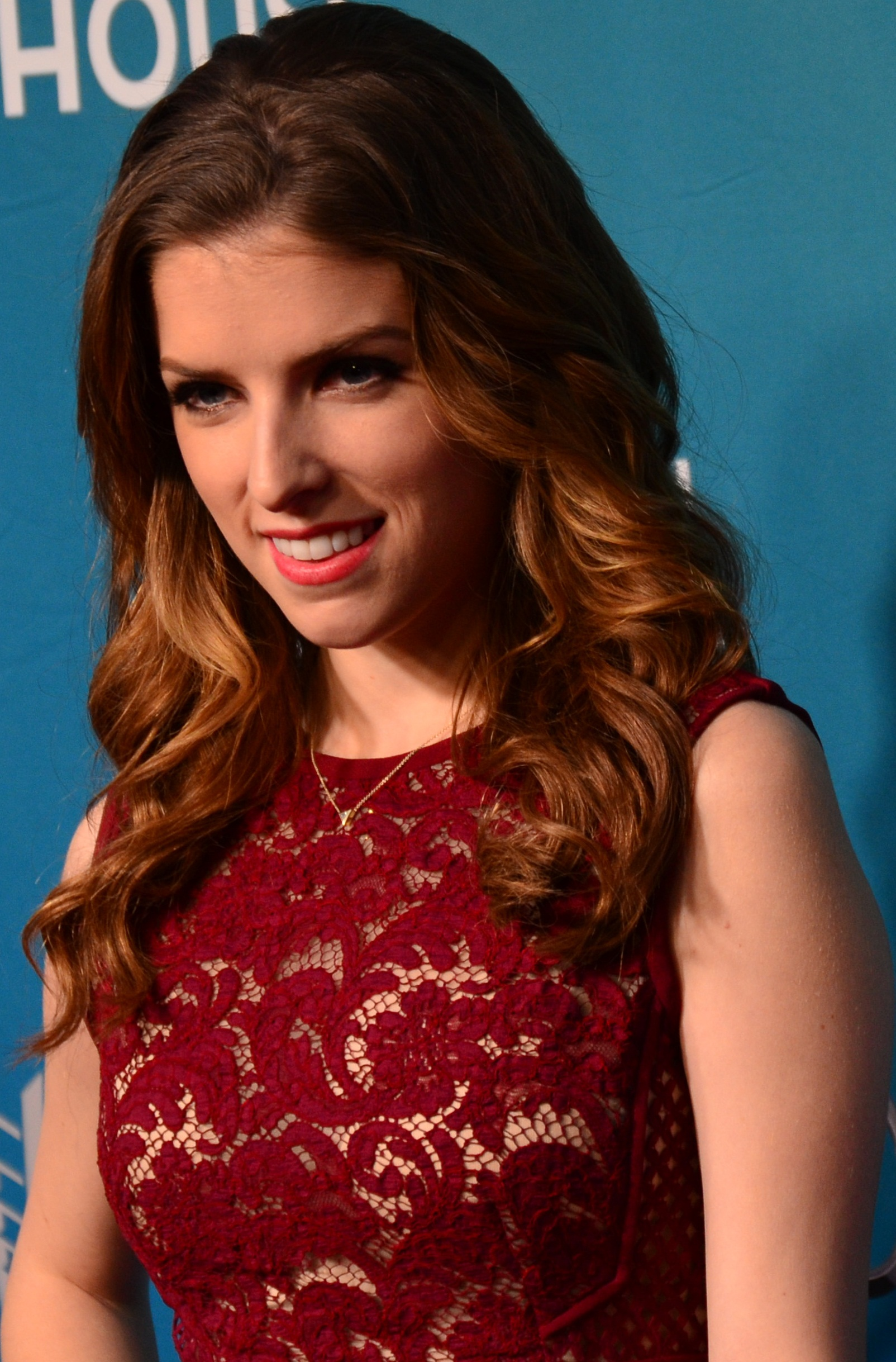
Kendrick at Geffen's Fundraiser in March 2014

Kendrick's most successful film of 2012 was the musical comedy Pitch Perfect, loosely based on the non-fiction book Pitch Perfect: The Quest for Collegiate A Cappella Glory. Kendrick played Beca Mitchell, a rebellious college freshman who joins an a cappella group called the Barden Bellas and finds that her more modern approach to music clashes with the traditional approach of the group's leader. The film emerged as a major commercial success. It received mostly positive reviews from critics, who called Kendrick's performance "splendid", saying that she "hits just the right note between pithy and chummy".

In 2013, Kendrick featured in the romantic comedy-drama Drinking Buddies, which received mostly positive reviews from critics, as well as the largely panned fantasy comedy Rapture-Palooza. At the Sundance Film Festival in January 2014, Kendrick was featured in three films. She played leading roles in the comedy-drama Happy Christmas and the horror comedy The Voices, which both received generally favorable reviews from critics, as well as a supporting role in the zombie comedy Life After Beth. Both Happy Christmas and Life After Beth received limited releases later in 2014, while The Voices was given a limited release in early 2015. Kendrick hosted Saturday Night Live in 2014.

At the Toronto International Film Festival in September 2014, Kendrick was featured in two films. She starred in the musical romance The Last Five Years, an adaptation of the off-Broadway musical of the same name. While the film itself received mixed reviews, Kendrick garnered widespread critical acclaim for her performance. She also played a supporting role in the comedy-drama Cake. Cake was eventually given a wide release in January 2015, while The Last Five Years received a limited release in February 2015. Kendrick was next seen playing Cinderella in Disney's Into the Woods (2014), director Rob Marshall's film adaptation of Stephen Sondheim's musical of the same name. Kendrick was among the members of the film’s extensive ensemble cast. The movie achieved significant commercial success and garnered generally favorable reviews from critics.

Kendrick competed in the first season of Lip Sync Battle against John Krasinski, one of the show's executive producers, in an episode aired in April 2015. She first performed "Steal My Girl" by One Direction, in which she jokingly revealed the object of her affection to be Krasinski's newlywed wife, Emily Blunt. Kendrick also performed "Booty" by Jennifer Lopez, in which Lopez herself made a surprise appearance at the end of the song. The audience declared Kendrick the winner. The episode garnered over 1.75 million U.S. viewers.

Kendrick played a supporting role in Digging for Fire, which premiered at the 2015 Sundance Film Festival and received a limited release in August of that year. In May 2015, she reprised her role of Beca Mitchell in Pitch Perfect 2. The film, which followed Mitchell in her senior year of college as the co-president of the Barden Bellas, emerged as a major box office blockbuster and surpassed the success of the first film.

=== 2016–present: Trolls franchise and leading film roles ===
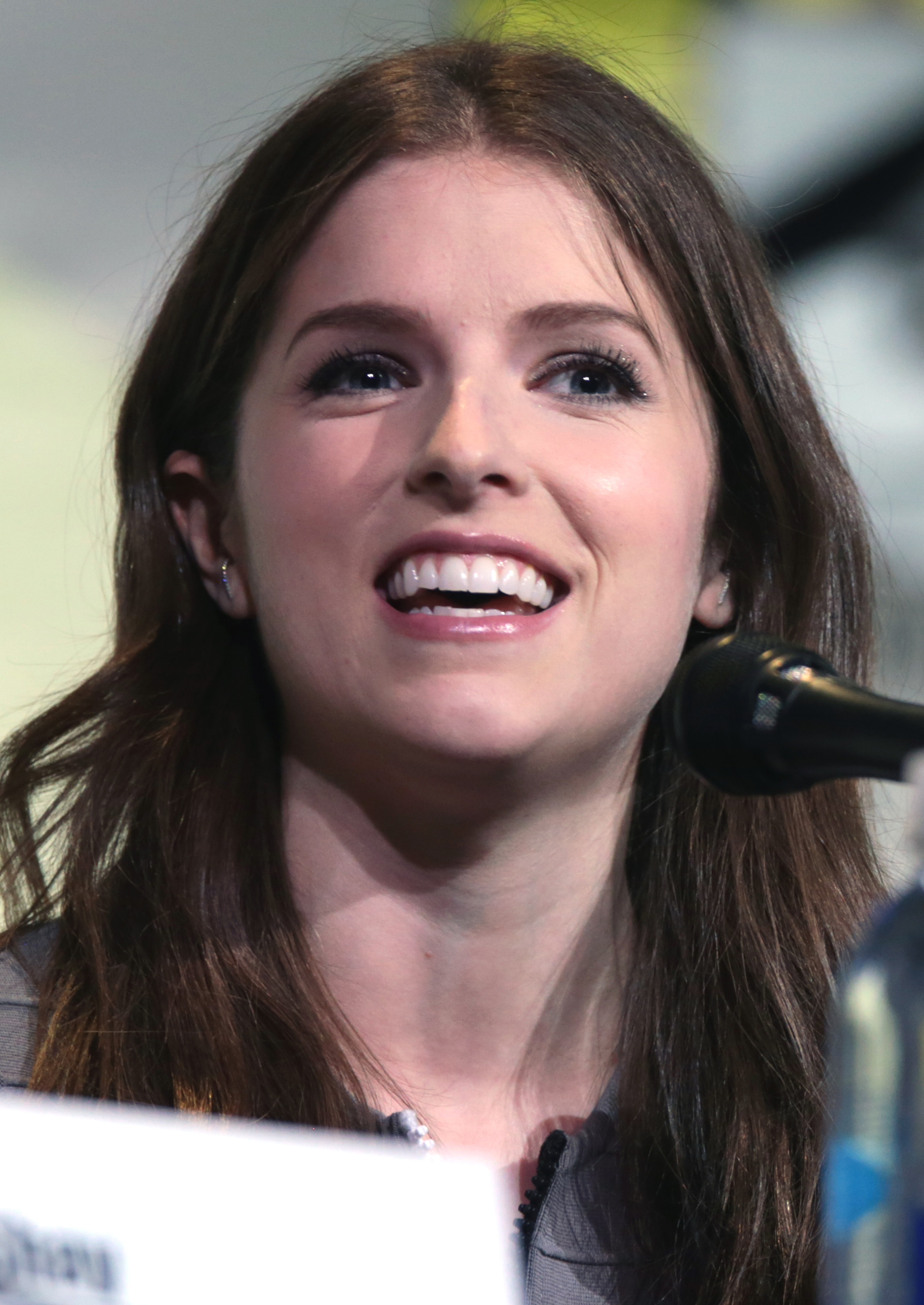
Kendrick at the 2016 San Diego Comic-Con

Kendrick starred in the action comedy Mr. Right, which premiered at the 2015 Toronto International Film Festival and was released on April 8, 2016. She also starred in The Hollars, a comedy-drama directed by and starring John Krasinski, which premiered at the 2016 Sundance Film Festival, and was theatrically released in August 2016. She was then seen in the coming-of-age film Get a Job, which received a limited release in March 2016 after being delayed since 2012.

Also in 2016, Kendrick starred in the commercially successful comedy Mike and Dave Need Wedding Dates, voiced Princess Poppy, the main character of the animated film Trolls, and co-starred in the action thriller The Accountant. Kendrick's memoir Scrappy Little Nobody was published on November 15, 2016.

Kendrick starred in Table 19, which was released March 3, 2017. She again reprised the role of Beca Mitchell in Pitch Perfect 3, released on December 22, 2017. In September 2018, she starred as Stephanie Smothers in the mystery-thriller film A Simple Favor. Also in September 2018, Kendrick began appearing in a series of advertisements across a range of media for Hilton Hotels.

In 2019, Kendrick co-starred in the satirical crime comedy The Day Shall Come and played the titular character in the Disney+ Christmas comedy Noelle. Kendrick also voiced a character in the Facebook Watch adult animated comedy series Human Discoveries. Also in 2019, it was announced that Kendrick would star as a state trooper with irreversible hearing loss in Unsound, directed by Bharat Nalluri.

Kendrick reprised her role as Poppy in the 2020 sequel Trolls World Tour. Due to the COVID-19 pandemic, Universal Pictures released the film via video on-demand platforms as a digital rental on April 10, 2020. She starred in the Quibi comedy series Dummy, for which she also served as executive producer. For her performance, she was nominated for the Primetime Emmy Award for Outstanding Actress in a Short Form Comedy or Drama Series. Also in 2020, Kendrick starred in the HBO Max romantic comedy anthology series Love Life, for which she additionally served as an executive producer. She appeared next as the lead in Stowaway, a science-fiction thriller which was released on April 22, 2021. She starred in the films Alice, Darling and Self Reliance, and made her directorial debut with Woman of the Hour which debuted at the 2023 Toronto International Film Festival. In 2025, she reprised her role as Stephanie Smothers in Another Simple Favor.

== Artistry and public image ==
Helen Barlow of The New Zealand Herald and Mary Pols of Time agreed that Kendrick was often cast as mean characters early in her film career. In addition to contributing comedic relief in supporting roles, she became known for playing neurotic yet warm, endearing women in a range of genres. According to Ryan Gilbey of The Guardian, she is drawn towards tenacious and hyper-confident characters, although the actress admitted she is much less assertive than the characters she plays, describing her work as "wish-fulfilment". Gilbey described her artistic trademark as "that moment when her characters undergo a revelatory or disorienting change". For a period of time after her breakthrough, Kendrick rejected a handful of specific roles to avoid being typecast. The Philippine Star said Kendrick's versatility and commitment to ultimately resulted in her becoming the first main Twilight cast member nominated for an Oscar. However, in 2020, writer Mary Elizabeth Williams opined that she had struggled to transition "into more diverse, complicated roles".

Alex Vo of Rotten Tomatoes said her career has been "defined by steady versatility", and she particularly excels in hybrid comedies and musicals. Her public profile grew from starring in a series of high-profile musical films, with Pitch Perfect cementing her as "one of her generation's most adept 20-something actresses", according to Asawin Suebsaeng of Mother Jones. Film critic Ty Burr called her "the first great movie musical star of her generation". Citing Pitch Perfect, The Last Five Years and Into The Woods as examples, Helen Whitaker of Glamour found musicals "to be the only constant" in her diverse filmography. Up in the Air director Jason Reitman said Kendrick "talks like someone from the 1940s", and the actress confirmed some of her favorite films are from this era. Meanwhile, Gilbey said she is "a crisp dramatic actor with a facility for screwball, as well as a knack ... for being adorable without lapsing into kookiness". Burr felt Kendrick "might have been a valued triple threat" similar to Ginger Rogers had she been famous during the studio era. She has been described as having a soprano vocal range.

Kendrick herself has said that she is perceived as quirky and relatable on the internet, and journalists have often commented on the outspokenness, wit, relatability, and self-awareness she presents across interviews and social media. However, she described herself as too "snarky" to interact directly with fans in fear of offending them. Although some publications have called her "America's Sweetheart", Kendrick has said she has no interest in embracing the title. Emma Stefansky of Vanity Fair declared her one of the funniest women in Hollywood, whereas Sadaf Ahsan of the National Post said Kendrick has cultivated an image that is charming, endearing, and precocious both on and off-screen, comparing her to Shirley Temple. In 2016, Allison P. Davis of The Ringer remarked that Kendrick has remained likeable by avoiding backlash commonly associated with overexposure. In 2017, Elle writer Antonia Blyth described the actress as warm, friendly, and honest "with none of the typical celebrity reserve", despite her growing fame. The Globe and Mail film critic Barry Hertz said the actress has spent much of her career since Pitch Perfect perfecting "the funny-perky-nerdy-but-cool-girl image", finally breaking it with 2023's Alice Darling.

Kendrick said she would rather celebrities use their privilege to amplify more educated experts on social issues, rather than discuss them herself. She has spoken about experiencing gender bias in Hollywood, specifically times when she has been forced to wait for a film's male characters to be cast before she is seriously considered for a role. Kendrick donated her Woman of the Hour salary to various charities.

== Personal life ==
Kendrick resides in Los Angeles.

She began dating English filmmaker Edgar Wright in 2009, after they met while filming Scott Pilgrim vs. the World. They separated in March 2013. She began dating English cinematographer Ben Richardson in February 2014, after they met while filming Drinking Buddies. They separated in 2020.

She has said that her experience in an emotionally abusive relationship inspired her performance in Alice, Darling. In her 2016 memoir Scrappy Little Nobody, she wrote "Motherhood isn't for me."

Anna's father, William Kendrick, died in 2022.

== Filmography ==
=== Film ===
Year	Title	Role	Notes
2003	Camp	Fritzi Wagner	
2007	Rocket Science	Ginny Ryerson	
2008	Twilight	Jessica Stanley	
2009	Elsewhere	Sarah	
2009	The Marc Pease Experience	Meg Brickman	
2009	The Twilight Saga: New Moon	Jessica Stanley	
2009	Up in the Air	Natalie Keener	
2010	Scott Pilgrim vs. the World	Stacey Pilgrim	
2010	The Twilight Saga: Eclipse	Jessica Stanley	
2011	50/50	Katherine McKay	
2011	The Twilight Saga: Breaking Dawn – Part 1	Jessica Stanley	
2012	The Company You Keep	Diana	
2012	End of Watch	Janet Taylor	
2012	ParaNorman	Courtney Babcock	Voice
2012	Pitch Perfect	Beca Mitchell	
2012	What to Expect When You're Expecting	Rosie Brennan	
2013	Drinking Buddies	Jill	
2013	Rapture-Palooza	Lindsey Lewis	
2014	Cake	Nina Collins	
2014	Happy Christmas	Jenny	
2014	Into the Woods	Cinderella	
2014	The Last Five Years	Cathy Hiatt	
2014	Life After Beth	Erica Wexler	
2014	The Voices	Lisa	
2015	Digging for Fire	Alicia	
2015	Mr. Right	Martha McKay	
2015	Pitch Perfect 2	Beca Mitchell	
2016	The Accountant	Dana Cummings	
2016	Get a Job	Jillian Stewart	
2016	The Hollars	Rebecca	
2016	Mike and Dave Need Wedding Dates	Alice	
2016	Trolls	Princess Poppy	Voice
2017	Pitch Perfect 3	Beca Mitchell	
2017	Table 19	Eloise McGarry	
2018	A Simple Favor	Stephanie Smothers	
2019	The Day Shall Come	Kendra Glack	
2019	Noelle	Noelle Kringle	
2020	Trolls World Tour	Queen Poppy	Voice
2021	Stowaway	Zoe Levenson	
2022	Alice, Darling	Alice	
2023	Self Reliance	Maddy	
2023	Trolls Band Together	Queen Poppy	Voice
2023	Woman of the Hour	Sheryl Bradshaw	Also director and executive producer
2025	Another Simple Favor	Stephanie Smothers	
2025	ParaNorman: The Thrifting	Courtney Babcock	Voice
2026	Misty Green	Naomi	
2026	Babies	Annie	

=== Television ===
Year	Title	Role	Notes
2007	Viva Laughlin	Holly	Episode: "What a Whale Wants"
2009	Fear Itself	Shelby Johnson	Episode: "The Spirit Box"
2012	Family Guy	Nora	Voice; episode: "Internal Affairs"
2013	So You Think You Can Dance	Herself	Guest judge; 1 episode
2013	Comedy Bang! Bang!	Herself	Episode: "Anna Kendrick Wears A Patterned Blouse & Burgundy Pants"
2014	Saturday Night Live	Herself	Host; episode: "Anna Kendrick/Pharrell Williams"
2015	Lip Sync Battle	Herself	Episode: "Anna Kendrick vs. John Krasinski"
2017	Last Week Tonight with John Oliver	Nan Britton	Episode: "Sinclair Broadcast Group"; segment: "Harding"
2017	Trolls Holiday	Poppy	Voice; television special
2019	Human Discoveries	Jane	Voice; main role; also executive producer
2020	Dummy	Cody Heller	Main role; also executive producer
2020–2021	Love Life	Darby Carter	Main role (season 1); Guest role (season 2); also executive producer
2021	Trolls: Holiday in Harmony	Poppy	Voice; television special
2023	Scott Pilgrim Takes Off	Stacey Pilgrim	Voice; main role

=== Music videos ===
Year	Title	Role	Artist	Ref.
2010	"Pow Pow"	Shape Shifter	LCD Soundsystem	
2012	"Do It Anyway"	Secretary	Ben Folds Five	
2012	"Starships"	Herself	Mike Tompkins with the cast and fans of Pitch Perfect	
2013	"Cups (When I'm Gone)"	Kitchen Worker	Herself	
2017	"Freedom! '90" / "Cups"	Beca Mitchell	The Bellas from Pitch Perfect 3 and the Top 12 contestants of The Voice season 13	
2020	"Love On Top"	Beca Mitchell	Cast of Pitch Perfect	

=== Theatre ===
Year	Title	Role	Notes
1998	High Society	Dinah Lord	St. James Theatre
2003	A Little Night Music	Fredrika Armfeldt	New York City Opera

== Discography ==
=== Singles ===
Title	Year	Peak chart positions							Certifications	Album
Title	Year	US	AUS	AUT	CAN	IRE	NZ	UK	Certifications	Album
"Cups"	2013	6	44	75	12	26	26	71	RIAA: 3× Platinum; ARIA: Platinum; BPI: Platinum; RMNZ: 2× Platinum	Pitch Perfect (Soundtrack)
"True Colors" (with Justin Timberlake)	2016	— (Note: "True Colors" did not enter the Billboard Hot 100, but peaked at number 11 on the Bubbling Under Hot 100 Singles chart.)	—	—	—	—	—	—	BPI: Gold; RMNZ: Platinum	Trolls (Soundtrack)
"—" denotes a recording that did not chart in that territory.

=== Other certified songs ===
List of songs, showing year released, certifications and album name
Title	Year	Certifications	Album
"Get Back Up Again"	2016	BPI: Silver; RMNZ: Gold	Trolls (soundtrack)

== Awards and nominations ==
Throughout her career, for her work on screen and stage, Kendrick has received several awards and nominations. Among them, she is one of the few actors to have been nominated for an Oscar, Emmy and Tony in acting categories, labeled the "Triple Crown of Acting".

- Tony Award (1998) nomination for Best Featured Actress in a Musical, for High Society
- Academy Award (2009) nomination for Best Supporting Actress, for Up in the Air
- Primetime Emmy Award (2020) nomination for Outstanding Actress in a Short Form Series, for Dummy

== Bibliography ==
- Kendrick, Anna (2016). Scrappy Little Nobody. New York: Touchstone Books. ISBN 9781501117206. OCLC 946903044.
