= Jodi Arias: Dirty Little Secret =

2013 American television film directed by Jace Alexander

- Written by: Gregory Small; Richard Blaney
- Directed by: Jace Alexander
- Starring: Tania Raymonde; Jesse Lee Soffer; David Zayas; Leah Pipes; Zane Holtz
- Theme music composer: Erran Baron Cohen; Gregor Narholz
- Country of origin: United States
- Original language: English

Production
- Executive producers: Joshua D. Maurer; Alixandre Witlin; Judith Verno
- Producers: Kyle A. Clark; Lina Wong
- Cinematography: Sharone Meir
- Editor: Kathryn Himoff Christopher Nelson Yvette Mangassarian
- Running time: 120 minutes
- Production companies: City Entertainment; PeaceOut Productions; Silver Screen Pictures

Original release
- Network: Lifetime
- Release: June 22, 2013

Jodi Arias: Dirty Little Secret is a 2013 American made-for-television drama film about the murder of Travis Alexander. Directed by Jace Alexander and executive produced by Joshua D. Maurer, Alixandre Witlin and Judith Verno, the film focuses on Jodi Arias, a California woman who was convicted of murdering her ex-boyfriend, Travis Alexander, in Mesa, Arizona. It depicts the couple’s tempestuous, hypersexual relationship leading up to the fateful killing. Created for and distributed by the Lifetime in association with City Entertainment and Silver Screen Pictures, the film premiered June 22, 2013.

== Production ==
City Entertainment's Maurer and Witlin originally sold the project to Lifetime, which began consideration of the film as early as March 2012, eight months before the trial commenced, and began shooting it even as the trial was underway. A March 2013 report by Fox News shared that pre-production and casting were underway at that time, filming was to begin at Los Angeles locations in April, and actress Tania Raymonde had been selected to play the role of Jodi Arias.

Filming of the project began while the Maricopa County, Arizona trial was still ongoing, and concluded after the trial's May 8, 2013 first degree murder verdict for defendant Jodi Arias. The film's courtroom scenes were shot two days after the trial's conclusion, with portions of the original script rewritten to include key moments excerpted from case's final proceedings.

== Storyline ==
The film follows the prosecution's timeline of events, and while some of the film's dialog is taken word-for-word from actual court transcripts, only the last five minutes of the film are dedicated to the courtroom scenes. The bulk of the film revolves around the love affair between Jodi Arias (Tania Raymonde) and Travis Alexander (Jesse Lee Soffer), the man she was convicted of murdering.

== Cast ==
- Tania Raymonde as Jodi Arias
- Jesse Lee Soffer as Travis Alexander
- David Zayas as Detective Esteban Flores
- Leah Pipes as Katie
- Zane Holtz as Nick
- Tony Plana as Prosecutor Juan Martinez
- Debra Mooney as Caroline, Jodi’s grandmother
- Jace Alexander as Boss
- Meredith Salenger as Jennifer Willmott, Jodi’s defense attorney
- Jeff Howard as Paul
- Makinna Ridgway as Helen
- Kimberly Whalen as Angela
- Cynthia Addai-Robinson as Sheri
- Fernando Aldaz as Guy
- Jen Oda as Lab Tech

== Critical response ==
The film met with both mixed and positive reviews from critics, with a score of 53 out of 100 from Metacritic. According to Nielsen Research as reported by Broadway World, in its averaging 3.1 million viewers on its premiere, the "film ranks as this year's #2 original cable movie". Geoff Berkshire of Variety says the movie, while unabashed exploitation, makes no apologies. Randy Cordova of The Arizona Republic says the movie was great, but felt it was too soon to make a film based on the murder. In USA Today, Cordova found that through "smart direction" the film was "better than expected", and praised the lead actor's performances as "sensitive and layered." People offered that the film did not unearth anything new about the murder case but was fine entertainment. They wrote it was "a pretty good film. It's a draw-you-in, sudsy melodrama stocked with guilty pleasures: romance, sex, obsession, betrayal and vengeance."
