= Tony Plana =

Cuban–American actor (born 1952)

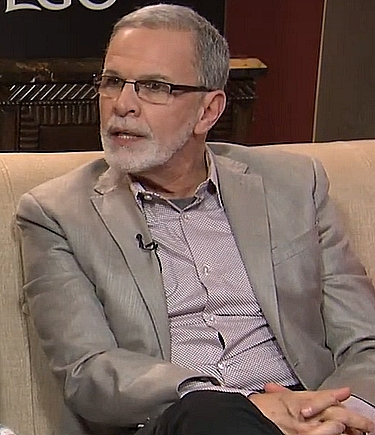
- Plana in 2019
- Born: José Antonio Plana; April 19, 1952 (age 74); Havana, Cuba
- Citizenship: United States
- Education: Loyola Marymount University
- Occupations: Actor; director
- Years active: 1974–present
- Spouse: Ada Maris (m. 1988)
- Children: 2

José Antonio Plana (born April 19, 1952) is a Cuban–American actor and director. He is known for playing Betty Suarez's father, Ignacio Suarez, on the ABC television show Ugly Betty and for voicing Manuel "Manny" Calavera in the video game Grim Fandango.

== Early life and education ==
José Antonio Plana was born on April 19, 1952, in Havana, Cuba. His family moved to Miami in 1960. Plana is a graduate of Loyola Marymount University and was trained in acting at the Royal Academy of Dramatic Art in London.

== Career ==
While known to a broad audience for his roles in feature films and television, Plana is also known for his skills in acting and directing for the stage. In 1995, he founded East L.A. Classic Theatre and over the course of a decade, Plana created and directed a number of Shakespeare productions for minority audiences. He has been active in the Los Angeles, Washington, D.C., and New York City theater communities, including leading appearances on Broadway and at New York City's Public Theater. Plana originated the role of Rudy in the Los Angeles production of Luis Valdez's play Zoot Suit, going on to play Rudy in the film version.

Plana has acted, directed and written for television in series, miniseries, and specials such as Hill Street Blues, Star Trek: Deep Space Nine, Resurrection Boulevard, Commander in Chief, CSI: Crime Scene Investigation, The West Wing, 24, and Cagney & Lacey. He also directed Witch's Lament, a Desperate Housewives episode in the show's eighth season.

Plana has acted in films such as An Officer and a Gentleman, Three Amigos, Goal!, and Lone Star. He is known to PC gamers as the voice of Manny Calavera in the LucasArts 1998 adventure game Grim Fandango. In 2011, Plana guest starred in Desperate Housewives as Gabrielle Solis's abusive stepfather, Alejandro Perez. That same year, he appeared in Body of Proof, in the episode "Helping Hand".

Plana participated in the web series Los Americans (2011), about a middle-class family in Los Angeles.

Plana teaches acting at California State University, Dominguez Hills and Rio Hondo College. In 2012, he served as a judge for the Noor Iranian Film Festival.

== Politics ==
Plana volunteers as a spokesperson for comprehensive immigration reform. He was the keynote speaker for the 2012 LULAC conference in Coronado Springs Convention Center in Lake Buena Vista, Florida.

=== Awards and nominations ===
TableCAPTION
Year	Award	Category	Nominee(s)	Result	Ref.
1996	Bravo Award	Outstanding Actor in a Feature Film	For Tony Plana's performance in Lone Star	Nominated	
2001	ALMA Award	Outstanding Actor in a New Television Series	For Tony Plana's performance in Resurrection Blvd.	Nominated	
2002	ALMA Award	Outstanding Actor in a Television Series	For Tony Plana's performance in Resurrection Blvd.	Nominated	
2006	Satellite Awards	Best Actor in a Supporting Role in a Series, Miniseries, or Motion Picture Made for Television	For Tony Plana's role as "Ignacio Suarez" in Ugly Betty	Won	
2006	Screen Actors Guild Awards	Best Ensemble - Comedy Series	For Tony Plana's performance in Ugly Betty	Nominated	

== Filmography ==
=== Film ===
- 1978: The Boss' Son – Juan
- 1980: Seed of Innocence (uncredited)
- 1980: First Family – White House Gardener
- 1981: Love & Money – National Guard General
- 1981: Circle of Power – Reza Haddad
- 1981: Zoot Suit – Rudy
- 1982: An Officer and a Gentleman – Emiliano De la Serra
- 1983: Valley Girl – Low Rider
- 1983: Nightmares – Father Luis Del Amo (segment "The Benediction")
- 1983: El Norte – Carlos, The Bus Boy
- 1983: Deal of the Century – Chicano Man
- 1985: City Limits – Ramos
- 1985: Latino – Ruben
- 1985: Godzilla 1985 – Goro Maki (voice, uncredited)
- 1986: The Best of Times – Chico
- 1986: Salvador – Major Max
- 1986: Three Amigos – Jefe
- 1987: Disorderlies – Miguel
- 1987: Born in East L.A. – Feo
- 1988: Buy & Cell – Raoul
- 1989: Romero – Father Manuel Morantes
- 1989: What's Up, Hideous Sun Demon – Officer Ignatz
- 1990: Why Me? – Benjy Klopzik
- 1990: The Rookie – Morales
- 1990: Havana – Julio Ramos
- 1991: One Good Cop as Beniamino Rios
- 1991: JFK – Carlos Bringuier
- 1992: Live Wire – Al-Red
- 1993: Red Hot – KGB Investigator
- 1993: Greshnitsa v maske – Le Arden
- 1994: A Million to Juan – Jorge
- 1995: Nixon – Manolo Sanchez
- 1996: Lone Star – Ray
- 1996: Primal Fear – Martinez
- 1996: Down for the Barrio – Cesar
- 1996: Canción desesperada – Patrick
- 1996: The Disappearance of Garcia Lorca – Marcos, Lorca's Friend
- 1997: Santa Fe – Chief Gomez
- 1997: One Eight Seven – Principal Garcia
- 1998: The Wonderful Ice Cream Suit – Victor Medina
- 1998: Shadow of Doubt – Detective Krause
- 1998: Every Dog Has Its Day – The Cop
- 1999: Let the Devil Wear Black – Tall
- 2000: Knockout – Chuck Alvarado
- 2000: Picking Up the Pieces – Usher
- 2001: Vegas, City of Dreams – Captain Martin
- 2002: Half Past Dead – Warden Juan Ruiz 'El Fuego' Escarzaga
- 2005: The Lost City – The Emcee
- 2005: Goal! – Hernan Munez
- 2007: El Muerto – Aparicio
- 2007: Hacia la oscuridad – Carlos Gutierrez
- 2007: Half Past Dead 2 – Warden Juan Ruiz 'El Fuego' Escarzaga
- 2008: AmericanEast – Dez
- 2009: Life Is Hot in Cracktown – Lou
- 2011: America – Tio Poldo
- 2012: The Man Who Shook the Hand of Vicente Fernandez – Dr. Dominguez
- 2013: Pain and Gain – Captain Lopez
- 2013: A Miracle in Spanish Harlem – Mariano
- 2016: America Adrift – William Fernandez
- 2017: Roman J. Israel, Esq. – Jessie Salinas
- 2017: Butterfly Caught – Michael Channis
- 2019: Wasp Network – Luis Posada Carriles
- 2026: Office Romance – Francisco Alberto

=== Television ===
Tony Plana television credits
Year	Title	Role	Notes	Ref.
1978	What's Happening!!	Amid	1 episode	
1978	The Paper Chase	Marcos	Episode: "The Man in the Chair" (S1.E15)	
1981	Madame X	Senor Rueda	TV movie	
1984, 1988	Miami Vice	Ernesto Guerrero / Cinco	2 episodes	
1988	Break of Dawn	Rodriguez	TV movie	
1989	The Equalizer	Antonio Cruz	Episode: "Prisoners of Conscience"	
1989	The Case of the Hillside Stranglers	Mike Hernandez	TV movie	
1989	21 Jump Street	Robert Mendez	Episode: “Come from the Shadows”	
1991	Seinfeld	Manny	Episode: "The Apartment" (S2.E5)	
1991	The Golden Girls	Alvarez	1 episode	
1993–1994	Bakersfield, P.D.	Luke Ramirez	17 episodes	
1994	Star Trek: Deep Space Nine	Amaros	Episode: "The Maquis" Parts 1 & 2 (S2.E20-21)	
1995	Silver Strand	Richie Guttierez	TV movie	
1995	Santo Bugito	Paco (voice)	2 episodes	
1997	Extreme Ghostbusters	Carl Rivera (voice)	1 episode	
2001	The West Wing	Mickey Troop	2 episodes (S2. E13-14)	
2003	John Doe	Captain Ruiz	Episode: "Doe or Die" (S1.E17)	
2003	Monk	Captain Alameda	1 episode	
2004	24	Omar	5 episodes	
2005	CSI: Crime Scene Investigation	Elindio Zapata	1 episode	
2005	The Closer	Alonzo Lopez	1 episode	
2006–2010	Ugly Betty	Ignacio Suarez	85 episodes	
2011	Desperate Housewives	Alejandro Perez	5 episodes	
2011	Body of Proof	Armando Rosas	Episode: "Helping Hand"	
2013	Psych	Pablo Nuñez	Episode: "No Country for Two Old Men" (S7.E4)	
2013	Jodi Arias: Dirty Little Secret	Prosecutor Juan Martinez	TV movie	
2013–2014	Alpha House	Benito 'Benny' Lopez	6 episodes	
2014	Jane the Virgin	Father Ortega	1 episode	
2015–2017	The Fosters	Victor Gutierrez	6 episodes	
2015	Cristela	Joaquin Alvarez	1 episode	
2015	Criminal Minds: Beyond Borders	Father Consolmango	1 episode	
2016	The Young Pope	Carlos García	3 episodes	
2016–2018	Lethal Weapon	Ronnie Delgado	7 episodes	
2017	Colony	Proxy Alcala	4 episodes	
2017–2021	Superstore	Ron Sosa	3 episodes	
2017–2019	One Day at a Time	Berto	4 episodes	
2017–2019	The Punisher	Rafael Hernandez	8 episodes	
2018	Mayans M.C.	Devante Cano	7 episodes, FX TV	
2018	Shooter	Guitierez	1 episode	
2018–2019	Elena of Avalor	Qapa (voice)	2 episodes	
2019	Jugar con fuego	Peter Miller	9 episodes	
2019	Dynasty	Silvio Flores	1 episode	
2019	The Affair	Ben Cruz	1 episode	
2020	Enemigo íntimo	Santilla	Season 2	
2020	Connecting...	Ramon	1 episode	
2020-2021	The Good Fight	Oscar Rivi	5 episodes	
2023	The Legend of Vox Machina	Kamaljiori (voice)	1 episode	
2023	White House Plumbers	Eugenio Martínez	5 episodes	
2025	Only Murders in the Building	George	1 episode	

== Voice acting ==
Video games

- 1998: Grim Fandango – Manuel "Manny" Calavera
- 2017: Ghost Recon Wildlands – El Cardenal

Other voice roles

- 2003: Cuba Libre – Narrator
- 2003: Hiroshima – Radio play based on the book by John Hersey, adapted by John Valentine
