= Elsewhere (2009 film) =

- Directed by: Nathan Hope
- Written by: Nathan Hope; Jess Penner
- Produced by: Elaine Ehrlich; Vince Palomino; Teresa Zales
- Starring: Anna Kendrick; Paul Wesley; Tania Raymonde
- Cinematography: Mike Karasick
- Edited by: Greg Tillman
- Music by: Bernie Larsen
- Production company: Lost Toys
- Distributed by: Gravitas Ventures
- Release date: January 15, 2009
- Running time: 106 minutes
- Country: United States
- Language: English

Elsewhere is a 2009 American crime thriller drama film directed by Nathan Hope and starring Anna Kendrick, Paul Wesley and Tania Raymonde.

== Plot ==
Goshen, Indiana is a small farm town that doesn't seem to offer much to its teenagers. High school seniors Sarah (Anna Kendrick) and Jillian (Tania Raymonde) have been best friends for so long that they can't remember when their friendship started. Growing up in Goshen, the two couldn't be more different.

Sarah, whose attorney mother Maureen (Suzanne Lang) hasn't been home much lately, is a star student and athlete, while Jillian, who has a rough home life, is a mischief-maker. They, along with another girl named Darla Tod (Olivia Dawn York), work at a cafe/candy store owned by Mr. Palomino (Dan Flannery).

Although Sarah and Jillian both long to break free of the small-town life, Jillian, who is the more desperate of the two, is the first to act, revealing to Sarah that she has been meeting men on-line with the intention of finding a man who will get her out of Goshen, which is 25 miles southeast of South Bend, the home of the University of Notre Dame.

Soon after a party, during which Jillian had to fight off the advances of Billy (Paul Wesley), the party's host, Jillian vanishes, leaving Sarah with only a journal and a cryptic video message sent from Jillian's cell-phone.

Sarah soon discovers that most of the town would rather forget that Jillian had ever existed. The cops are no help, and even Jillian's mother Candy (Kinna McInroe) doesn't care.

In fact, because Jillian has run away before, everyone, including Candy, is convinced that Jillian has finally had enough, and just run away. But Sarah notices things that make her feel that something's just not right.

Distraught, Sarah delves into the secrets surrounding Jillian's disappearance, and she gets the help of fellow high school student Jasper (Chuck Carter), the resident computer expert who secretly has feelings for her. Sarah's only clues are the video sent from Jillian's cellphone, and a strange necklace that Jillian received from her online boyfriend.

Sarah and Jasper come to believe that Jillian might be the latest victim of someone who Sarah and Jasper believe has been kidnapping and killing teenage girls in the area—but only the girls that no one actually cares enough to search for.

Sarah talks to Patty Melville (Shannon Holt), a local woman whose daughter Janet (Holi Tavernier) has been missing for three years, and Sarah believes that Janet might be one of the victims.

Sarah and Jasper find themselves at the risk of losing their lives, as Jasper gets attacked, and someone starts stalking Sarah. But Sarah is willing to do whatever it takes to figure out what happened to Jillian.

== Cast ==
- Anna Kendrick as Sarah
- Jon Gries as Mr. Tod
- Olivia Dawn York as Darla Tod
- Paul Wesley as Billy
- Tania Raymonde as Jillian
- Jeff Daniel Phillips as Officer Berg
- Chuck Carter as Jasper
- Shannon Holt as Patty Melville

== Production ==
Filming occurred in Goshen, Indiana in 2006.
