= David Zayas =

Puerto Rican actor and former police officer (born 1962)

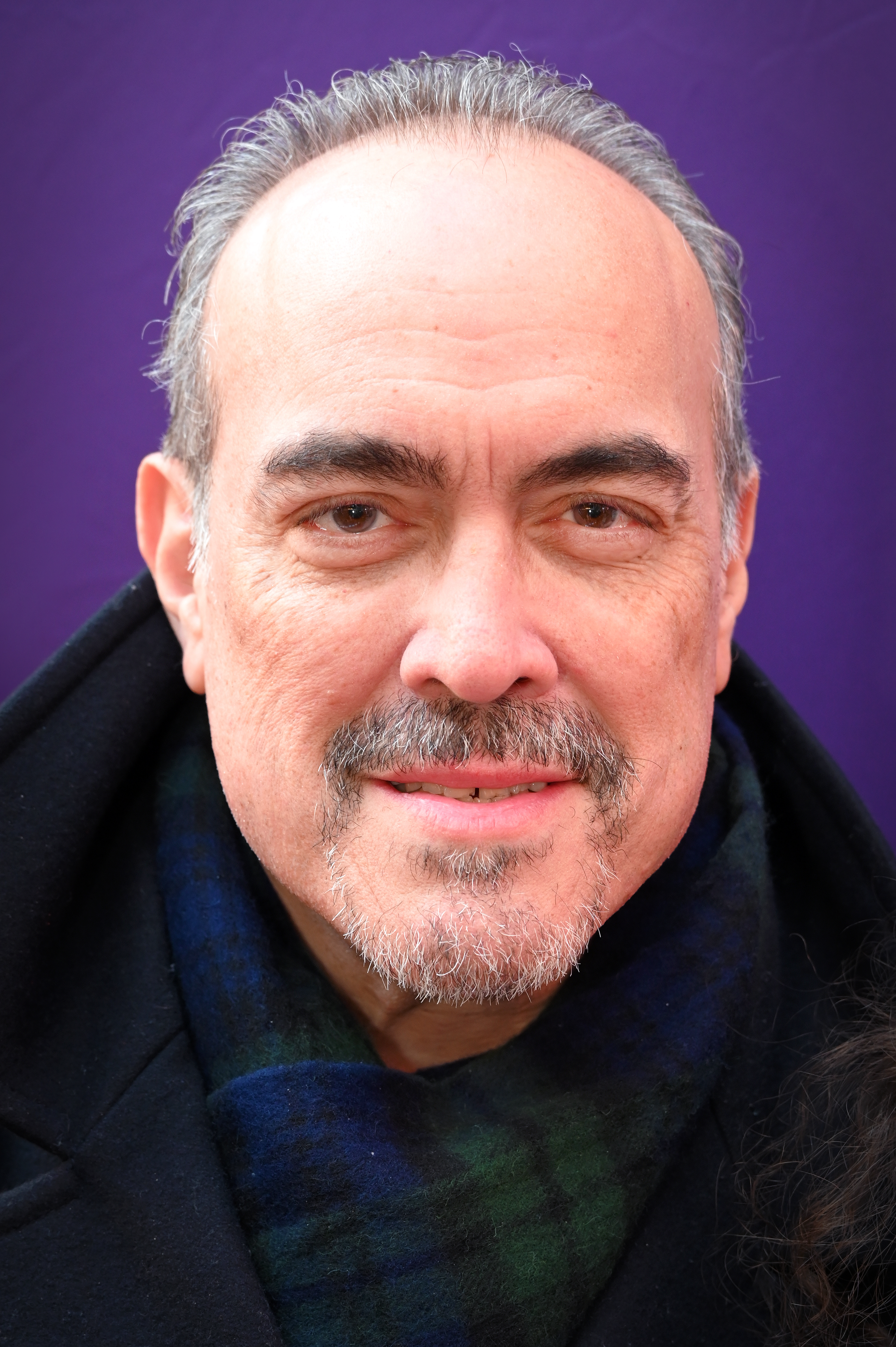
- Zayas in 2026
- Born: August 15, 1962 (age 64); Ponce, Puerto Rico
- Occupation: Actor
- Years active: 1995–present
- Spouse: Lisa Colón (m. 1998)
- Police career
- Department: New York Police Department
- Service years: 1986–2000
- Status: Retired

David Zayas (born August 15, 1962) is a Puerto Rican actor. He is best known for his roles as Angel Batista on the Showtime series Dexter, Dexter: New Blood and Dexter: Resurrection and Enrique Morales on the HBO prison drama series Oz.

== Early life ==
Zayas was born in Ponce, Puerto Rico, and raised in The Bronx, New York.

== Career ==
Zayas joined the United States Air Force at age 19 and was a police officer with the New York City Police Department for almost 15 years. His experience as a police officer allowed him to develop as a character actor, leading to a series of acting jobs on television and film, mainly playing law enforcement officers, but playing characters on the other side of the law, as well, such as Enrique Morales on HBO's long-running prison-drama Oz. Zayas was a main cast member of Dexter for all of its eight seasons and its spinoff series Dexter: Resurrection.

Zayas has been a member of the LAByrinth Theater Company since 1992, a New York City-based traveling actors group. He branched out into television and film projects, and has diversified with guest roles in such popular television series such as New York Undercover, Person of Interest, FBI (playing Mexican drug lord Antonio Vargas), and NYPD Blue. At LAByrinth, he met his future wife, actress Liza Colón.

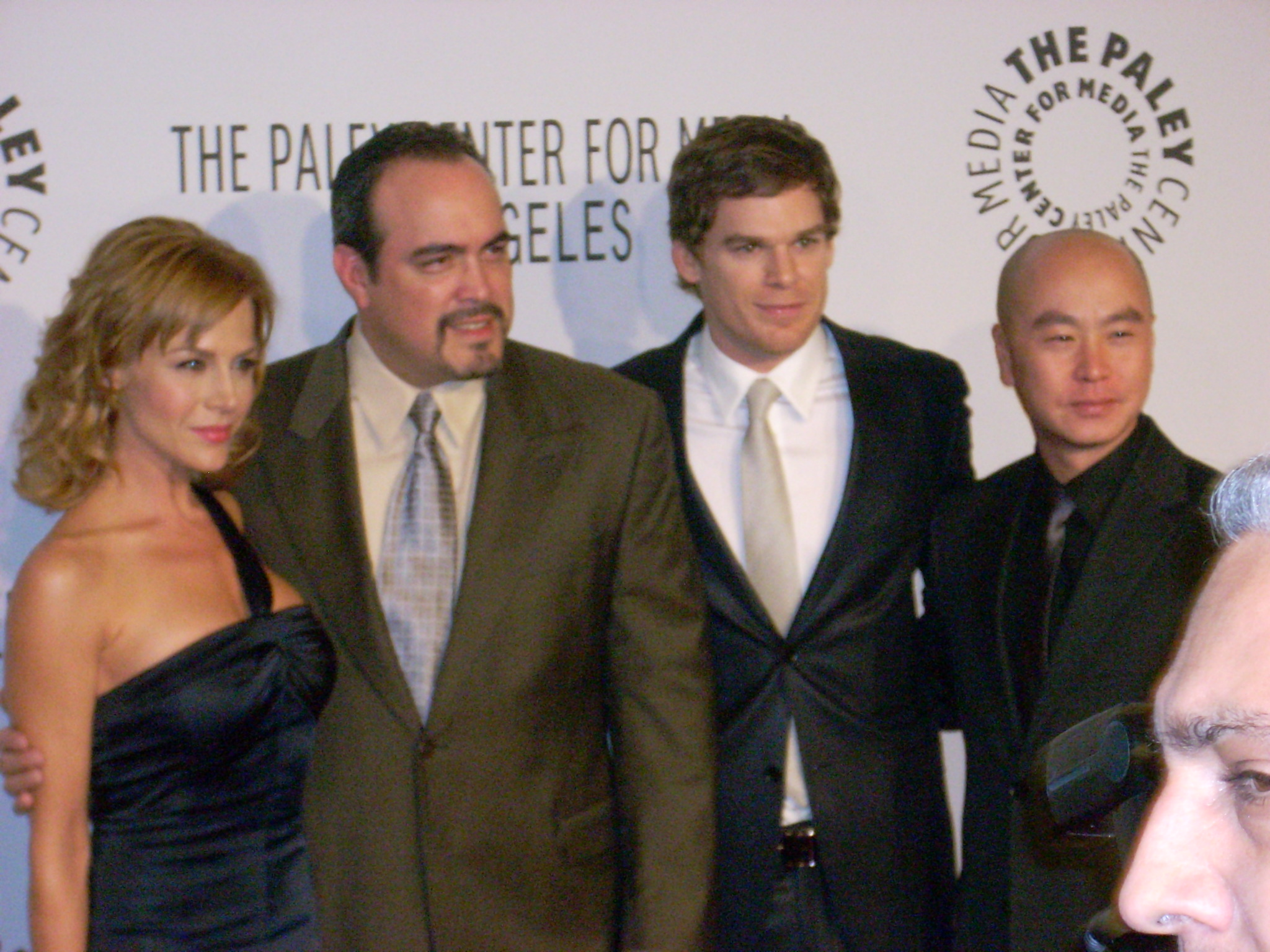
(L-R): Julie Benz, David Zayas, Michael C. Hall and C.S. Lee at the Paley Center for Media Gala Honoring Showtime Networks in 2008

Zayas played a corrupt police officer in 16 Blocks (2006) and an NYPD officer in Michael Clayton (2007). He is featured in the independent film Shadowboxing (2010), which appeared on the film festival circuit. He appears in Sylvester Stallone's feature film The Expendables (2010) and The Brothers Strause's film Skyline (2010). In 2012, Zayas played Ernie Trask, a hotel super, in the twelfth episode of season 1 of Person of Interest. In 2013 he portrayed Detective Esteban Flores in Jodi Arias: Dirty Little Secret, a television film about the murder of Travis Alexander.

Zayas portrayed mob boss Sal Maroni in the Batman prequel Gotham, which premiered on Fox on September 22, 2014. Shortly thereafter, he appeared in Annie (2014) as Lou, a gregarious bodega owner who helps Cameron Diaz's Hannigan learn to love herself.

Zayas starred in the 2021 film R#J, a modern retelling of Romeo and Juliet. Shaun Munro noted Zayas as one of the few prominent actors present in the film and called him "well-cast in the role of Juliet’s amusingly surly father."

== Filmography ==
=== Film ===
Year	Title	Role	Notes
1997	Lena's Dreams	Jorge	
1998	OK Garage	Omar	
1998	Scar City	Cop #1	
1998	Return to Paradise	Construction Foreman	
1998	Rounders	Trooper Osborne	
1998	Bleach	Lieutenant Ballard	Short film
1999	Bringing Out the Dead	Cop in Elevator	
1999	Kingdom Come	Unknown	
2000	The Yards	Officer Jerry Rifkin	
2001	Sam the Man	Officer Billy	
2002	Washington Heights	David	
2002	A Gentleman's Game	Alfred D'Angelo	
2003	Anne B. Real	Cynthia's Dad	
2004	Mimmo & Paulie	Paulie	Short film
2004	Jailbait	Guard	
2004	Brooklyn Bound	Popo	
2005	The Interpreter	Secret Service Agent Charlie Russell	
2005	Sangre/Blood	Nestor	Short film
2005	The Feast of the Goat	Antonio De La Maza	
2006	16 Blocks	Detective Bobby Torres	
2006	The Path to 9/11	Lou Napoli	
2006	Bristol Boys	Detective Benson	
2007	Michael Clayton	Detective Dalberto	
2007	The Savages	Eduardo	
2009	Burning Mussolini	Hector	
2009	Wake	Detective Grayson	
2009	Flying By	Tony	
2010	13	Detective Larry Mullane	
2010	Shadowboxing	Bill	
2010	The Expendables	General Garza	
2010	Skyline	Oliver	
2013	Samuel Bleak	Ruben Ramirez	
2014	Ride	Ramon	
2014	Annie	Lou	
2015	The Wannabe	Pablo Guzman	
2016	Tallulah	Detective Richards	
2017	Teen Titans: The Judas Contract	Alberto Reyes (voice)	Direct-to-video
2017	Shine	Ramon	
2020	Body Cam	Sergeant Kesper	
2020	Force of Nature	John The Baptist	
2021	R and J	Fernando Capulet	
2025	The Running Man	Richard Manuel	

=== Television ===
Year	Title	Role	Notes
1995	Law & Order	McGinty	Episode: "Savages"
1996	New York Undercover	Paco Martinez	Episode: "The Enforcers"
1996	Law & Order	Raoul Cervantes	Episode: "Causa Mortis"
1997	Feds	Unknown	Episode: "Somebody's Lyin'"
1998	Trinity	Uniform Cop #1	Episode: "...To Forgive, Divine"
1998	Law & Order	Carlos	Episode: "Flight"
1999	Third Watch	Motorman	Episode: "Welcome to Camelot"
2000	NYPD Blue	Joaquin Enriquez	Episode: "These Shoots Are Made for Joaquin"
2000	The Beat	Rei Morales	12 episodes
2000	All My Children	Unknown	Episode: "13 December 2000"
2000–2003	Oz	Enrique Morales	26 episodes
2001	Wit	Code Team Blue Head	Television film
2002	Law & Order: Special Victims Unit	Detective Milton	Episode: "Protection"
2002	UC: Undercover	Jorge Gonzales	Episode: "Manhunt"
2002	Guiding Light	Prison Guard	Episode: "22 October 2002"
2003	Law & Order	John Mireles	Episode: "Smoke"
2003	Angels in America	Super	3 episodes
2003	Undefeated	Paulie	Television film
2005	Angel	Angel's Father	Television film
2006–2013	Dexter	Angel Batista	96 episodes
2006	Numb3rs	Carlos Costavo	Episode: "Brutus"
2006	Law & Order: Criminal Intent	Fire Marshall	Episode: "On Fire"
2007	Without a Trace	Gabriel Molina	Episode: "Crash and Burn"
2007	Shark	Alvarez	Episode: "Strange Bedfellows"
2007	The Closer	Brian	Episode: "Grave Doubts"
2007	Burn Notice	Javier	Episode: "Pilot"
2008	Law & Order	Detective Justin Cabrera	Episode: "Submission"
2009	CSI: Miami	Ben Porterson	Episode: "Wolfe in Sheep's Clothing"
2009	In Plain Sight	Harrison Locke	Episode: "Rubble with a Cause"
2010	Law & Order: Criminal Intent	Lt. Stanley Maas	Season 9: 2 episodes
2012	Person of Interest	Ernie Trask	Episode: "Super"
2012	Grimm	Salvadore Butrell	Episode: "Leave It to Beavers"
2013	The Following	Tyson Hernandez	Episode: "Guilt"
2013	Deception	Frank	Episode: "Pilot"
2013	Jodi Arias: Dirty Little Secret	Detective Esteban Flores	Television film
2013–2023	The Blacklist	Manny Soto	4 episodes
2014	Saint George	Junior	6 episodes
2014–2015	Gotham	Sal Maroni	8 episodes
2015	Elementary	Juan 'El Gato' Murillo	Episode: "The Past Is Parent"
2016	Bloodline	Sheriff Aguirre	7 episodes
2016–2017	Shut Eye	Eduardo Bernal	20 episodes
2017–2024	Blue Bloods	Governor of New York Martin Mendez	7 episodes
2018	Seven Seconds	Captain Carlos Medina	Episodes: "Of Gods and Men", "Until It Do"
2018	Chicago P.D.	Carlos Mendoza	Episode: "Endings"
2018	Quantico	Charlie	Episode: "Hell's Gate"
2019	Deadly Class	El Alma del Diablo	5 episodes
2020	Next	Ignacio	3 episodes
2020–2021	FBI	Antonio Vargas	3 episodes
2021	Pose	Carlos	Episode: "Something Old, Something New"
2021–2022	Dexter: New Blood	Angel Batista	Episodes: "Runaway" & "Sins of the Father"
2024	Diarra from Detroit	Marshall	Recurring role
2024	Bob's Burgers	Bubble Master (voice)	Episode: "Jade in the Shade"
2024–2026	The Bear	David Marrero	5 episodes
2025–2026	Dexter: Resurrection	Angel Batista	11 episodes
2026	The Night Agent	Mike Fonseca	2 episodes
2026	R.J. Decker	Victor Ochoa	4 episodes
2026	Law & Order: Special Victims Unit	Judge Warren Fels	Episode: "Corrosive"

=== Theatre ===
Year	Title	Role	Notes
2000	Jesus Hopped the 'A' Train	Valdez	East 13th Street Theatre
2003	Our Lady of 121st Street	Edwin	Union Square Theatre
2003	Anna in the Tropics	Cheché	Royale Theatre
2008	The Little Flower of East Orange	Espinosa / Surgeon 2	Joseph Papp Public Theater/Martinson Hall
2022	Cost of Living	Eddie	Samuel J. Friedman Theatre; Nominated—Tony Award for Best Featured Actor in a Play
2024	Brooklyn Laundry	Owen	New York City Center Stage I
