= Tania Raymonde =

American actress (born 1988)

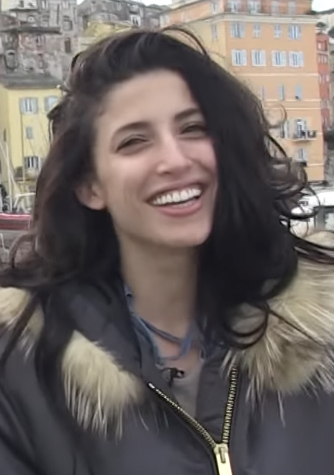
- Raymonde in 2017
- Born: Tania Raymonde Helen Katz; March 22, 1988 (age 38); Los Angeles, California, U.S.
- Occupation: Actress
- Years active: 2000–present
- Notable work: Lost; Jodi Arias: Dirty Little Secret; Goliath

Tania Raymonde Helen Katz (born March 22, 1988) is an American actress. She played Alex Rousseau in the ABC series Lost from 2006 to 2010, and Cynthia Sanders on the Fox sitcom Malcolm in the Middle between 2000 and 2002. She has appeared on MTV's Death Valley (2011), in the horror film Texas Chainsaw 3D (2013). She notably portrayed infamous convicted killer Jodi Arias in the Lifetime biographical film Jodi Arias: Dirty Little Secret (2013). In April 2015, she joined the cast of the TNT series The Last Ship. From 2016 to 2021, she starred in the Amazon Prime Video series Goliath.

== Early life ==
Tania Raymonde Helen Katz was born in Los Angeles, United States to an American father of Russian Jewish descent and a French Catholic mother from Corsica. She attended Lycée Français de Los Angeles. Raymonde is bilingual and fluent in French.

She was engaged to artist Zio Ziegler. Since July 2025, she has been in a relationship with actor Nathan Fillion.

== Career ==
Raymonde's first television role was as Alice/Young Syd in the "Syd in Wonderland" episode of the TV series Providence. She subsequently appeared on other TV series, including The Brothers Garcia, The Nightmare Room, That's So Raven, The Guardian, Lost, Medium, Malcolm in the Middle, and NCIS.

She starred in the film Children on Their Birthdays (2002), her first feature film role. In 2003 she played Lauren O'Keefe in the sitcom The O'Keefes.

She is most known for her work on the ABC drama Lost, where she played Alex Rousseau, the adopted daughter of Benjamin Linus, played by Michael Emerson.

She also appeared in the films The Garage (2006), The Other Side of the Tracks (2008), Japan (2008), Chasing 3000 (2008), and Elsewhere (2009). She recurred opposite the late Dennis Hopper on the Starz series Crash. Raymonde also had a recurring role as Frankie Rafferty, Danny Pino's love interest, on season 6 of Cold Case.

She appears in the music video for Maroon 5's "Won't Go Home Without You".

In 2013, Raymonde appeared in two episodes of the NBC series Chicago Fire as a backdoor pilot to set up the spin-off series Chicago P.D. but left the project before the show began. Raymonde also portrayed the infamous convicted murderer Jodi Arias in the Lifetime original movie Jodi Arias: Dirty Little Secret (2013).

From 2016 to 2021 she starred in the Golden Globe-winning Amazon series Goliath, alongside Billy Bob Thornton.

== Filmography ==
=== Film ===
| Year | Title | Role | Notes |
|---|---|---|---|
| 2002 | Children on Their Birthdays | Lily Jane Bobbit | |
| 2006 | The Garage | Bonnie Jean "B.J." | Direct-to-DVD |
| 2008 | Japan | Mae | |
| 2008 | Foreign Exchange | Anita Duarte | |
| 2009 | GoodSam and Max | Sam | Short film |
| 2009 | Elsewhere | Jillian | |
| 2009 | The Immaculate Conception of Little Dizzle | Ethyl | |
| 2009 | Wild Cherry | Helen McNicol | |
| 2009 | Still Waiting... | Amber | Direct to-DVD |
| 2010 | The Other Side of the Tracks | Amelia | TV to-DVD |
| 2010 | Chasing 3000 | Kelly | |
| 2011 | Chillerama | Zelda (segment "Wadzilla") | Direct to-DVD |
| 2011 | Losers Take All | Wendy Horowitz | |
| 2011 | Trophy Kids | Tiffany | |
| 2012 | Crazy Eyes | Autumn | |
| 2012 | Blue Like Jazz | Lauryn | |
| 2012 | Hatching Max | Shell | Short film |
| 2013 | Texas Chainsaw 3D | Nikki | |
| 2014 | Manson Girls | Leslie Van Houten | |
| 2017 | Dirty Lies | Amber | |
| 2019 | Cliffs of Freedom | Anna Christina | |
| 2020 | Deep Blue Sea 3 | Emma Collins | Direct to-DVD |
| 2023 | Walden | Detective Sally Hunt | |
| 2024 | Getting Lost | Herself | |
| 2024 | Futra Days | Nichole | |
| 2026 | Mexicali | Estrella | |

=== Television ===
| Year | Title | Role | Notes |
|---|---|---|---|
| 2000 | Providence | Alice / Young Syd | Episode: "Syd in Wonderland" |
| 2000 | The Brothers García | Nicole | Episode: "No hablo Espanol" |
| 2000–2002 | Malcolm In The Middle | Cynthia | 4 episodes |
| 2001 | The Nightmare Room | Beth | Episode: "Scareful What You Wish For" |
| 2003 | That's So Raven | Carly | Episode: "Saving Psychic Raven" |
| 2003 | The O'Keefes | Lauren O'Keefe | 8 episodes |
| 2003 | The Guardian | Petra | Episode: "Big Coal" |
| 2005 | NCIS | Anna Real | Episode: "An Eye for an Eye" |
| 2006 | Medium | Taylor Greene | Episode: "S.O.S." |
| 2006–2010 | Lost | Alex Rousseau | 21 episodes |
| 2008 | The Cleaner | Nika | Episode: "Five Little Words" |
| 2008 | CSI: NY | Laura Roman | Episode: "The Cost of Living" |
| 2008 | The Other Side of the Tracks | Amelia | TV movie |
| 2008–2010 | Cold Case | Frankie Rafferty | 8 episodes |
| 2009 | Bones | Lexi | Episode: "Mayhem on a Cross" |
| 2009 | Crash | Roxanne Thigpen | 2 episodes |
| 2009 | Law & Order: Criminal Intent | Shelley Smith/Birgit Kaspers | Episode: "Revolution" |
| 2010 | The Forgotten | Sarah Poole | Episode: "Mama Jane" |
| 2010 | Look: The Series | Courtney | 3 episodes |
| 2011 | Hawaii Five-0 | Melanie Ayres | Episode: "Ma'eme'e" |
| 2011 | Death Valley | Officer Carla Rinaldi | 12 episodes |
| 2012 | 90210 | Sonia | 3 episodes |
| 2012 | Switched at Birth | Zarra | 10 episodes |
| 2013 | Chicago Fire | Officer Nicole Sermons | 2 episodes |
| 2013 | Jodi Arias: Dirty Little Secret | Jodi Arias | TV movie |
| 2014 | Intelligence | Emily | Episode: "Secrets of the Secret Service" |
| 2014 | The Big Bang Theory | Yvette | Episode: "The Locomotive Manipulation" |
| 2015 | CSI: Crime Scene Investigation | Tina | Episode: "Hero to Zero" |
| 2015–2016 | The Last Ship | Valerie Raymond | 4 episodes |
| 2016–2021 | Goliath | Brittany Gold | 24 episodes |
| 2023 | S.W.A.T. | Abby | Episode: Witness |
| 2023 | NCIS | Chloe Marlene | Episode: Evil Eye |
| 2024 | The Lincoln Lawyer | Trina Rafferty | Episode: Strange Bedfellows |

=== Music videos ===
| Year | Title | Artist |
|---|---|---|
| 2007 | "Won't Go Home Without You" | Maroon 5 |
| 2009 | "I Couldn't Love You" | Cursive |
| 2011 | "Red Alert" | Arshad Aslam |
| 2014 | "Killing Days, Living Nights" | Keram Malicki-Sánchez |

=== Director ===
| Year | Title | Role | Notes |
|---|---|---|---|
| 2006 | Cell Division | Short | Also writer |
| 2017 | "Without You" (by Dream Dama featuring Pheona) | Music video | |

== See also ==
- List of Corsican people
