= Juan Martinez (prosecutor) =

Mexican-American prosecutor (born 1955)

Juan Martínez
- Born: Juan Mancera Martinez; August 31, 1955 (age 71); Celaya, Guanajuato, Mexico
- Citizenship: United States
- Education: University of California, Irvine (BA); Arizona State University College of Law (JD)
- Occupation: Prosecutor
- Years active: 1988-2020
- Employer: Maricopa County

Juan Mancera Martinez (born August 31, 1955) is a Mexican-American disbarred attorney and former Maricopa County homicide prosecutor. Known for his work on high-profile criminal cases in Arizona, Martinez gained national attention for his prosecution of Jodi Arias for the 2013 murder of Travis Alexander. During his 32-year career, Martinez was both praised and criticized for his assertive courtroom style. In 2020, Martinez agreed to be disbarred without admitting wrongdoing after facing multiple allegations of professional misconduct, including sexual harassment and ethical violations.

== Early life ==
Juan Martinez was born on a ranch near Celaya, Guanajuato, Mexico, as the sixth of seven children. He immigrated to Victorville, California, with his family when he was six. Martinez later earned a bachelor’s degree from the University of California, Irvine, and a Juris Doctor from the Arizona State University College of Law. He was admitted to the Arizona Bar in 1984.

== Maricopa County Prosecutor ==
Martinez joined the Maricopa County Attorney’s Office in 1988 as a deputy county attorney. Over his three-decade tenure, he became one of the office’s most prominent prosecutors, specializing in homicide and capital cases. He handled numerous high-profile murder trials, including the 2009 case against Phoenix Suns nutritionist Douglas Grant, the 1999 “sleepwalker” case of Scott Falater, and the 2011 case of Wendi Andriano.

Martinez gained widespread national attention as the lead prosecutor in the 2013 trial of Jodi Arias for the murder of Travis Alexander. The case attracted intense media scrutiny due to its salacious details and Arias’s extensive testimony.

== Controversies ==
His prosecutorial style was often controversial. In several rulings, appellate courts found his conduct to be overly combative; one Arizona Court of Appeals decision explicitly criticized his "impermissibly aggressive and combative demeanor" during a capital trial. Allegations against him included leaking confidential information to journalists, communicating improperly with jurors, and introducing altered evidence; these prompted the State Bar of Arizona to conduct multiple investigations.

In September 2019, Martinez was moved from the Capital Litigation Bureau to the Auto Theft Bureau because of ongoing complaints from the bar, including numerous sexual harassment allegations. He retired from the Maricopa County Attorney's Office in early 2020 and subsequently consented to disbarment by the Arizona Supreme Court, concluding his legal career in the state.

== Bibliography ==
- Martinez, Juan (December 27, 2016). Conviction. New York: William Morrow. ISBN 0-06-244429-8.
