= Liza Colón-Zayas =

American actress

- Born: Liza Colón; New York City, U.S.
- Education: University at Albany (BA)
- Occupations: Actress, playwright
- Years active: 1994–present
- Spouse: David Zayas (m. 1998)

Liza Colón-Zayas is an American actress and playwright. She is best known for playing Tina Marrero on the comedy-drama series The Bear (2022–2026), for which she won the Primetime Emmy Award for Outstanding Supporting Actress in a Comedy Series in 2024, becoming the first Latina to win a Primetime Emmy in that category.

== Early life and education ==
Liza Colón-Zayas was born as Liza Colón in The Bronx borough of New York City. She is of Puerto Rican descent.

She earned her bachelor's degree in theater from University at Albany.

== Career ==
Colón-Zayas began her career off-Broadway. She broke into mainstream theatre when she wrote, produced, and starred in a one-woman show titled Sistah Supreme, a semi-autobiographical play in which she chronicles growing up as a Latina woman in New York during the 1970s and 1980s.

Colón-Zayas has been a member of the LAByrinth Theatre Company, a New York-based traveling actors' group, since its founding in 1992. On stage, she originated the role of Norca in the off-Broadway productions of Our Lady of 121st Street and the role of Haiku Mom in Quiara Alegría Hudes' Pulitzer winner Water by the Spoonful. In 1999, she appeared in the Philip Seymour Hoffman directed play, In Arabia, We'd All Be Kings.

One of Colón-Zayas' most memorable roles to theatergoers was the "Church Lady" in Stephen Adly Guirgis's Pulitzer Prize-winning drama Between Riverside and Crazy which played the Atlantic Theater Company in 2014 and then Second Stage Theater in 2015. Colón-Zayas earned a Lucille Lortel Award for Outstanding Featured Actress for her portrayal. She went on to play the role once more in 2022 on Broadway at Second Stage's Hayes Theater.

In 2021, she was honored at the Dramatists Guild Foundation with the Madge Evans and Sidnet Kingsley Award. DGF’s longest-running award honors a mid-career dramatist and stage actresses for excellence in the theatre.

On the big screen, she appeared in United 93 (2006), Righteous Kill (2008), and the 2016 action horror film The Purge: Election Year.

Colón-Zayas has also appeared in television series such as Sex and the City, Law & Order: Special Victims Unit, Blue Bloods, Dexter, and many more. In 2019, she got her first recurring role on the short-lived OWN drama, David Makes Man, and in 2021, she joined the cast of the Emmy-winning drama, In Treatment, as Rita.

In 2022, Colón-Zayas rose to significant fame after starring in Hulu's dramady series The Bear as cynical cook Tina Marrero. She received critical praise for her performance and won a Screen Actors Guild Award, Imagen Award, and Primetime Emmy Award for Outstanding Supporting Actress in a Comedy Series. Her Emmy win made her the first Latina to win a Primetime Emmy in that category. She starred as Janet in John Krasinski's live-action animated fantasy comedy feature IF, released on May 17, 2024.

In May 2025, Colón-Zayas was announced to have joined the cast of Spider-Man: Brand New Day as Jean DeWolff, a detective and ally to Spider-Man, played by Tom Holland. Brand New Day released on July 31, 2026, and was a massive critical and commercial success. In October 2026, Colón-Zayas portrayed Ivy in the Broadway production of Downstate at the Booth Theater.

== Personal life ==
Colón-Zayas is married to actor David Zayas.

== Acting credits ==
=== Film ===
Year	Title	Role	Notes
1995	The Keeper	C.O. Melendez	
2002	Unfaithful	Grumpy teacher	
2002	Apartment #5C	Yolanda	
2004	Keane	1st Ticket Agent	
2005	Heights	Ana	
2006	Freedomland	Bea	
2006	United 93	Waleska Martinez	
2007	Goodbye Baby	Host	
2008	Righteous Kill	Judge Angel Rodriguez	
2011	Margaret	Nurse	
2012	Won't Back Down	Yvonne	
2013	All Is Bright	Mother of Six	
2015	The Stockroom	April	
2016	The Purge: Election Year	Dawn	
2016	All at Once	Linda Ramirez	
2016	Collateral Beauty	Trevor's Mom	
2017	Lost Cat Corona	Jasmine	
2018	Breaking Brooklyn	Ms. Cruz	
2020	Before/During/After	Juanita	
2021	Naked Singularity	Liszt	
2022	Allswell in New York	Ida	
2023	Cat Person	Officer Elaine	
2024	IF	Janet	
2026	Spider-Man: Brand New Day	Detective Jean DeWolff	
TBA	Fleur †		Post-production

=== Television ===
Year	Title	Role	Notes
1994	New York Undercover	Speaker	Episode: "Los Macheteros"
2000	Deadline	Social Worker	Episode: "Daniel in the Lion's Den"
2001	Third Watch	Maria	Episode: "Adam 55-3"
2002–2022	Law & Order	Luisa / Sherry Velez / Lara Vega	3 episodes
2004	Sex and the City	Melita	Episode: "Splat!"
2004	Hope & Faith	Rusti	Episode: "Queer as Hope"
2004–2015	Law & Order: Special Victims Unit	Dolores Rodriguez / Cyndi	3 episodes
2005	Jonny Zero	Lucia	Episode: "La Familia"
2006	Conviction	M.E. Muldoon	Episode: "Breakup"
2006	The Bedford Diaries	Dr. Stern	Episode: "Abstinence Makes the Heart Grow Fonder"
2007	Rescue Me	Sarah	Episode: "Balance"
2008	House	Maria	Episode: "Emancipation"
2009	Taking Chance	Ticketing Agent	Television film
2009	Nurse Jackie	Mrs. Armando	Episode: "School Nurse"
2010	How to Make It in America	Gloria	Episode: "Big in Japan"
2010	Dexter	Paloma Aragon	Episode: "Take It!"
2011	Louie	Miss Hernandez	2 episodes
2011	Hung	Gloria	Episode: "The Whole Beefalo"
2013	Assistance	Dorothy	Television film
2015	Get Some!	Mickie Martell	Episode: "Chopped"
2016	Unforgettable	Laura Barton	Episode: "Bad Company"
2016	Blue Bloods	Ana Baez	Episode: "Stomping Grounds"
2016	The Pearl	Eileen Rosado	Television film
2017	Bull	ADA Jessica Goodman	Episode: "Already Gone"
2018	Titans	Detective Jessica Perez	2 episodes
2019	Proven Innocent	Lucia Rincon	Episode: "Pilot"
2019	David Makes Man	Principal Fallow	6 episodes
2021	In Treatment	Rita Ortiz	6 episodes
2022–2026	The Bear	Tina Marrero	Main role, 42 episodes

=== Theatre ===
Year	Title	Role	Notes
1995	¡Olé!	Liza (Sistah Supreme)	Off-Broadway; Playwright
1999	In Arabia, We'd All Be Kings	Daisy	Original Off-Broadway cast
2003	Our Lady of 121st Street	Norca	Off-Broadway
2003	Living Out	Zoila Tezo	Off-Broadway
2005	The Last Days of Judas Iscariot	Gloria / Mother Teresa	Off-Broadway
2007	A View From 151st Street	Lea	Off-Broadway
2008	The Little Flower of East Orange	Magnolia / Nurse 1 / Pope John XXIII	Off-Broadway
2009	Othello	Emilia	Off-Broadway
2012	Water by the Spoonful	Haiku Mom	Second Stage Theater Production
2014	Between Riverside and Crazy	Church Lady	Atlantic Theater Production
2015	Between Riverside and Crazy	Church Lady	Second Stage Theater Production
2017	Mary Jane	Sherrie	New York Theatre Workshop Production
2017	The Blameless	Amanda Garcia	Regional
2019	Halfway Bitches Go Straight to Heaven	Sarge	Atlantic Theatre's Off-Broadway World Premiere
2022	Between Riverside and Crazy	Church Lady	Original Broadway Production
2026	Downstate	Ivy	Broadway

== Awards and nominations ==
In 2024, she made history as the first Latina to win an Emmy for Outstanding Supporting Actress in a Comedy Series for The Bear. In 2025, she was nominated again for an Emmy for Outstanding Supporting Actress in a Comedy Series for The Bear.

=== Film and television ===
Year	Association	Category	Project	Result	Ref.
2023	Imagen Awards	Best Supporting Actress – Comedy (Television)	The Bear	Won	
2023	Screen Actors Guild Awards	Outstanding Performance by an Ensemble in a Comedy Series	The Bear	Nominated	
2024	Screen Actors Guild Awards	Outstanding Performance by an Ensemble in a Comedy Series	The Bear	Won	
2024	Primetime Emmy Awards	Outstanding Supporting Actress in a Comedy Series	The Bear	Won	
2024	Imagen Awards	Best Supporting Actress – Comedy (Television)	The Bear	Won	
2025	Golden Globes Awards	Best Performance by a Female Actor in a Supporting Role on Television	The Bear	Nominated	
2025	Primetime Emmy Awards	Outstanding Supporting Actress in a Comedy Series	The Bear	Nominated	

=== Theatre ===
Year	Association	Category	Project	Result	Ref.
2004	Lucille Lortel Awards	Outstanding Featured Actress	Living Out	Nominated	
2015	Lucille Lortel Awards	Outstanding Featured Actress in a Play	Between Riverside and Crazy	Won	
2018	Lucille Lortel Awards	Outstanding Featured Actress in a Play	Mary Jane	Nominated	
2020	Lucille Lortel Awards	Outstanding Lead Actress in a Play	Halfway Bitches Go Straight to Heaven	Nominated	
2020	Outer Critics Circle Awards	Outstanding Featured Actress in a Play	Halfway Bitches Go Straight to Heaven	Won	
2020	Obie Awards	Performance Award	Halfway Bitches Go Straight to Heaven	Won	
2020	Drama League Awards	Distinguished Performance Award	Halfway Bitches Go Straight to Heaven	Nominated	
2020	Drama Desk Awards	Outstanding Actress in a Play	Halfway Bitches Go Straight to Heaven	Won	
2021	Dramatists Guild Foundation	Madge Evans and Sidney Kingsley Award		Won	

== See also ==
- List of Puerto Ricans
