= Jonathan N. Dixon =

English-Australian writer and film director

Jonathan N. Dixon is an English / Australian writer and film director. His directorial debut horror film Wrath was released in 2011. His other films include the comedy Pictocrime (2004), which won best international feature at the LA Film Festival, and shorts Body in the Trunk (2006) and Phillip (2007).

== Early life and education ==
Jonathan N. Dixon was born in Bath, UK. He moved with his family to Andalusia, Spain when he was seven years old.

Studying art and design, he began working as a graphic artist and moved to Australia in his late teens.

== Career ==
After graduating from art college, Dixon began his career in marketing by working for a Japanese publishing house and spent time in Tokyo and Osaka, Japan. After several years he returned to Austria and hired a small film studio where he wrote, directed, edited, produced, and animated, "Force Five" a stop animation film. "Force Five" followed five secret agents who were part of C.E.N.T.E.R (Central Enforcement Network Targeting Evil Rogues) who would parachute into southern Bavaria during WW2 in order to kill the head of O.C.T.O (Official Crime & Terror Organisation). Dixon built the sets and designed the miniature characters by using remote control technology with mini servers in the characters heads. The movie was shot on a Bolex 16mm film camera. To fund his film he word work part-time for a SPFX company, building movie props and set pieces for Fox Studios.

Moving to Sydney in 2001, Dixon began working on his first feature film. The story follows two brothers trapped inside a comic book and caught up in a scheme to blackmail the Devil out of his souls. Shot on super 16mm, the film premiered in Sydney and went on to win "Best International Feature" in LA.

His 2004 comedy Pictocrime (2004) won best international feature at the LA Film Festival.

In 2007 Dixon wrote the screenplay for Origin Unknown, a WW2 horror/creature movie that takes place in the catacombs of German-occupied Paris on 19 August 1944, the day of liberation. He produced and directed a 6-minute faux scene segment for it and began shopping it around the studios in Hollywood. While under the management of The Collective, in Beverly Hills, the film was being packaged and pre sold to foreign territories Dixon was signed to the Paradigm Talent Agency. During the 2008 financial crisis, many of the financiers were forced to back out of the project leaving it in limbo. After trying to resurrect it Dixon later signed with (WME) William Morris Endeavor to develop other projects.

In 2010, Dixon returned to Australia and began working on his next film Wrath, a horror film set in the Australian outback. A worldwide release was planned with Arclight Films but the deal fell apart and the movie was released internationally on DVD and Pay TV through Lightning Entertainment in 2011. The film starred Stef Dawson.
