= Penn Badgley =

American actor (born 1986)

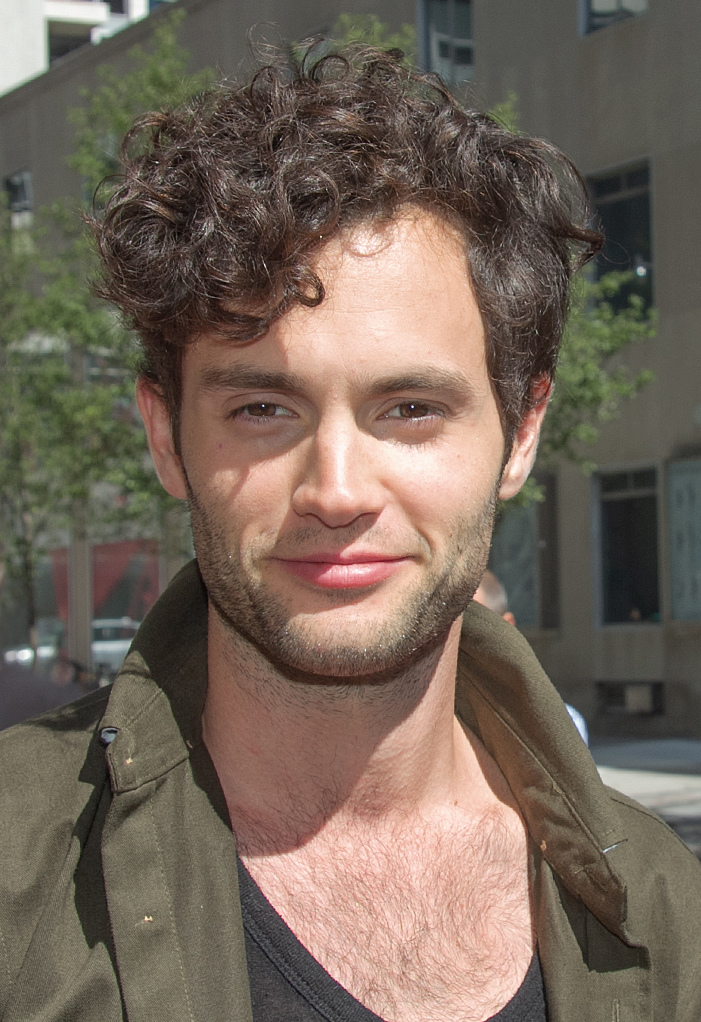
- Badgley at the 2012 Toronto International Film Festival
- Born: Penn Dayton Badgley; November 1, 1986 (age 40); Baltimore, Maryland, U.S.
- Occupations: Actor; producer
- Years active: 1994–present
- Spouse: Domino Kirke (m. 2017)
- Children: 3

Penn Dayton Badgley (born November 1, 1986) is an American actor and producer. He is known for his roles as Dan Humphrey in The CW teen drama series Gossip Girl (2007–2012) and as Joe Goldberg in the Netflix psychological thriller series You (2018–2025).

Badgley came to prominence playing Phillip Chancellor IV on the soap opera The Young and the Restless (2000–2001). He then featured in the comedy films John Tucker Must Die (2006), Drive-Thru (2007), and Easy A (2010), the thriller films The Stepfather (2009) and Margin Call (2011), the biographical film Greetings from Tim Buckley (2012), and the drama film The Paper Store (2016).

== Early life and education ==
Penn Dayton Badgley was born on November 1, 1986, in Baltimore, Maryland, the son of Lynne (née Murphy) and Duff Badgley. His father had worked as a newspaper reporter and then as a carpenter and home builder and was the Green Party candidate for governor of Washington State in 2008. Badgley has stated that his first name comes from the brand of tennis ball his father was holding during his mother's first sonogram.

An only child, Badgley attended Woolridge Elementary (where his mother served as a PTA president), before transferring to St. Christopher's School in Richmond, Virginia. He attended Charles Wright Academy in Tacoma, Washington. Badgley is said to have been home schooled alongside Blake Lively, his future co-star and partner. His parents divorced when he was 12. He recalls having "wanted to make music ... as a 12-year-old", and recorded an unreleased pop single in 1998, referring to the effort as "terrible" and "misguided" in an interview.

As a child, Badgley was involved with the Seattle Children's Theatre and the Pine Nut Players community theater in Monroe, Washington. His mother supported his acting efforts and worked various jobs—later starting a jewelry design business with Badgley's godmother, Jan Sneed. He has said he "skipped high school altogether" and at age 14, he took a proficiency exam and began attending Santa Monica College. (Note: There is a degree of discrepancy in the accounts of his secondary schooling, whether advancing by high school equivalence or by graduation; the account presented is the one most specific. He has otherwise replied to a question whose preface included, "You... graduated from high school at 13", saying "You end up doing all of this... graduating high school, spending your life on sets.") He was later accepted to the University of Southern California, but deferred admission due to contractual obligations, later enrolling for two years at Lewis & Clark College in Portland, Oregon.

== Career ==
=== 2000s ===
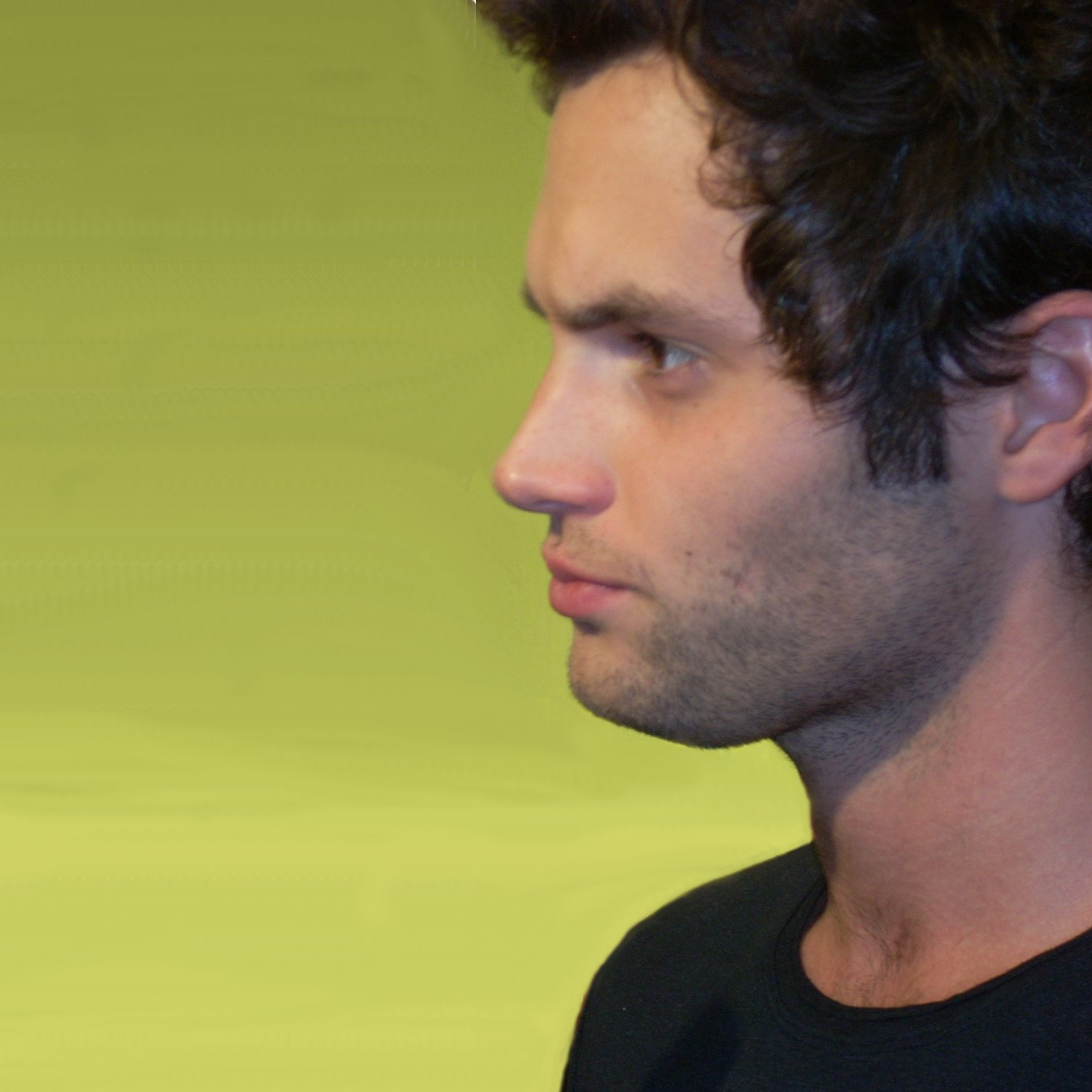
Badgley in 2009

Badgley and his mother moved to California so he could pursue an acting career. He recalls, in an interview, departing for Los Angeles at age 11. He soon began doing voice-overs for children's radio stations in Hollywood. His first credit was voice work for the video games Mario Golf 64 and Mario Tennis 64 in 1999 and 2000, respectively. Badgley had his first screen acting credit on an episode of Will & Grace, and he subsequently appeared on shows such as Daddio, The Brothers García, and What I Like About You. Badgley's first notable role was as Phillip Chancellor IV on the soap opera The Young and the Restless, which he portrayed from 2000 to 2001. He was nominated for the Young Artist Award for Best Performance in a Daytime Series in 2001 for his performance.

In 2002, Badgley starred in The WB's comedy-drama fantasy series Do Over as Joel Larsen, a 34-year-old man who gets a second chance at life due to a strange accident that catapults him back to 1980 as a 14-year-old. He went on to star in two other WB series: The Mountain from 2004 to 2005, and The Bedford Diaries in 2006. Badgley's first major film credit was 2006's John Tucker Must Die, playing the role of Scott Tucker. In its opening weekend, the film grossed a total of $14.3 million, ranking third in the U.S. box office results for that weekend. He later appeared in Drive-Thru, co-starring future castmate Leighton Meester.

In 2007, Badgley was cast as Dan Humphrey in The CW's teen drama series Gossip Girl, based on the book series of the same name by Cecily von Ziegesar. He initially turned down the role, but accepted after the producers struggled to find someone else to fill the role. His performance as Dan was praised by audiences and critics alike, and earned him six Teen Choice Award nominations over the show's run. Jason Gay of the Rolling Stone particularly complimented his characterization, writing that "while another actor may have played Dan as a blah straight man, Badgley imbued him with an occasionally obnoxious know-it-all-ness." In 2009, Badgley starred in the thriller film The Stepfather, a remake of the 1987 film, as the stepson of a serial killer.

=== 2010s ===
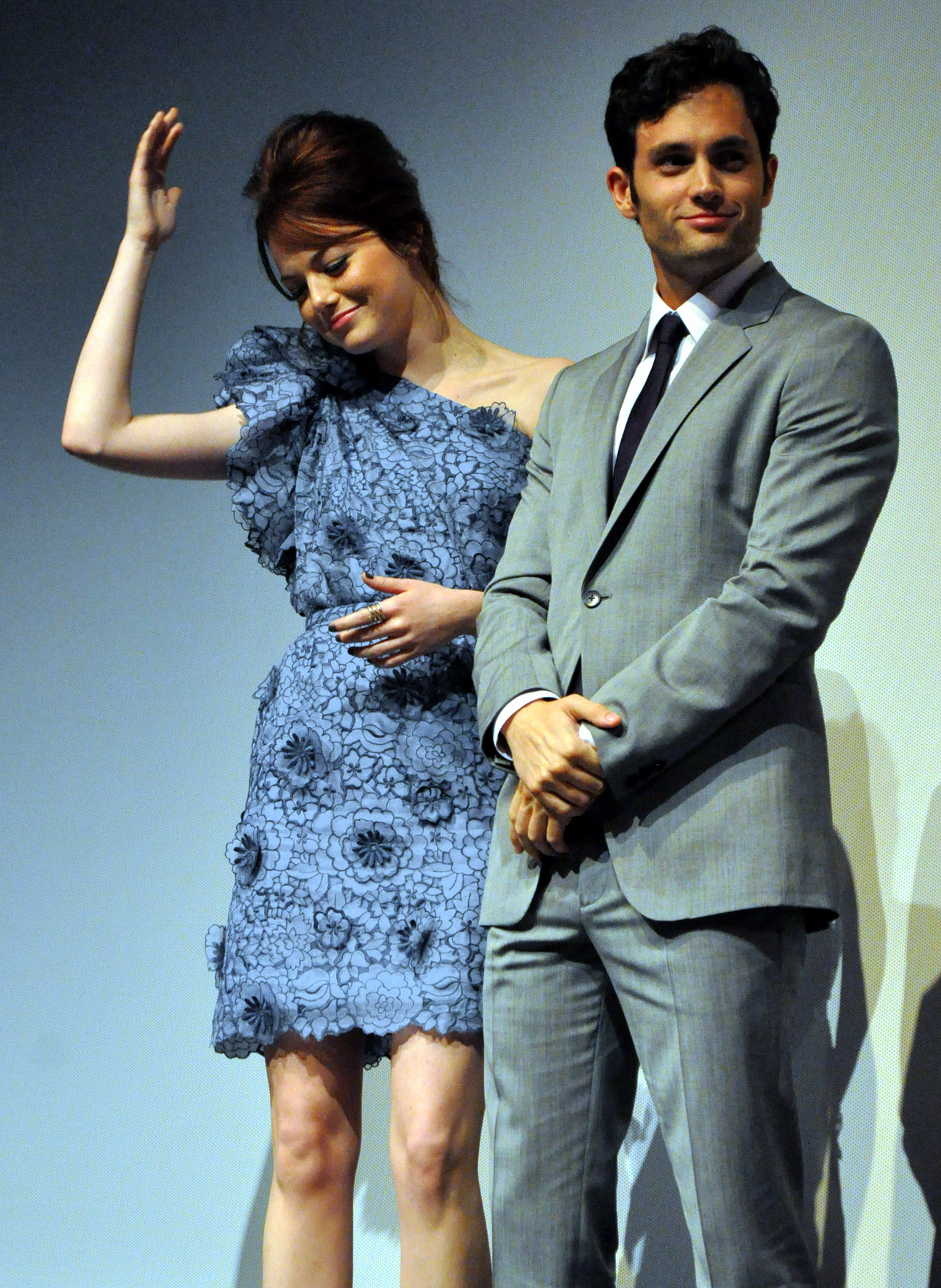
Badgley at the premiere of Easy A with Emma Stone in 2010

Badgley then played Todd, the love interest of Emma Stone's character, in the 2010 teen comedy film Easy A, which was a critical and commercial success, earning him a Teen Choice Award nomination. Next, he appeared in the financial thriller drama Margin Call in 2011, for which the ensemble cast was critically acclaimed. He won the Robert Altman Award as part of the cast, presented at the Independent Spirit Awards. In 2011, Badgley was named one of People's "25 Beauties (and Hotties) at 25", and BuddyTV ranked him number 75 on its "TV's 100 Sexiest Men of 2011" list.

Badgley portrayed musician Jeff Buckley in the 2012 biopic Greetings from Tim Buckley. The film follows Buckley's journey of grappling with the legacy of his late musician father, Tim, leading up to and culminating with his 1991 performance of his father's songs. For the role, Badgley took guitar and vocal lessons. In December 2012, he joined the cast of Parts per Billion, opposite Alexis Bledel and Teresa Palmer, which released in 2014. Also released in 2014 was crime triller Cymbeline, where he portrayed the orphan Posthumus.

Badgley had a recurring role in NBC's 2015 miniseries The Slap, based upon the Australian series of the same name, and had a minor role in the 2016 film Adam Green's Aladdin. Badgley won acclaim for his role in the independent film The Paper Store (2016), opposite Stef Dawson and Richard Kind, receiving Best Actor at Oxford International Film Festival and a Special Jury Mention at Manchester Film Festival.

Badgley starred as Joe Goldberg in the Netflix series You, formerly Lifetime's television adaptation of the book of the same name from September 2018 to April 2025. His performance was lauded by critics, with IGN calling it his best performance and writing that Badgley was "doing some of his best, most unhinged work in the series. His charming nature and playful face are the perfect, twisted mask for the 'Nice Guy With Control Issues' lurking underneath". Badgley received a Saturn Award nomination for his performance.

=== 2020s ===
In October 2019, Badgley was cast in the independent film Here Today opposite Billy Crystal and Tiffany Haddish, which was released in May 2021 to mixed reviews from critics. Also in 2021, he was part of an ensemble cast in Jimmy Giannopoulos' directorial debut and crime thriller, The Birthday Cake.

In June 2024, Badgley starred with Brandy and Monica in the music video for Ariana Grande's "The Boy Is Mine".

In July 2025, it was announced that Badgley and Meghann Fahy had been cast in Amazon MGM Studios' You Deserve Each Other, a romantic comedy film based on Sarah Hogle's novel of the same name.

== Other activities ==
=== Music ===
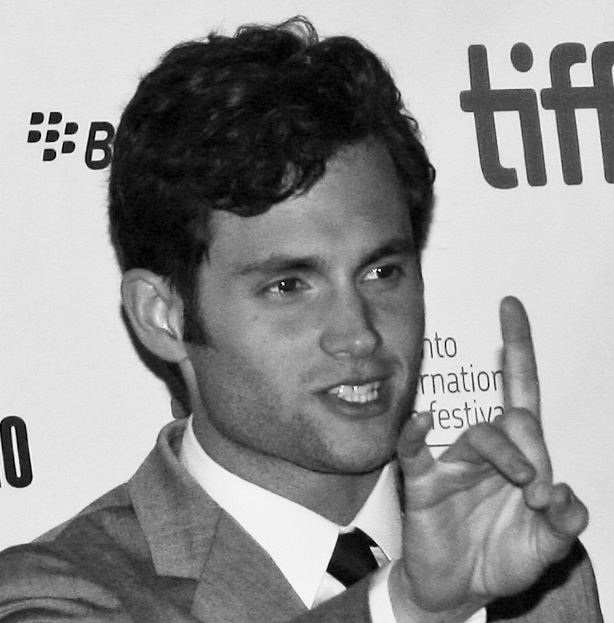
Badgley at the 2010 Toronto International Film Festival

Badgley and others formed a band and released a song titled "Easy" on SoundCloud under the name M O T H E R; the song quickly gained popularity and was posted on numerous blogs. The group changed the spelling to MOTHXR in 2015, citing a cease-and-desist from another band with a similar name. They promptly signed with the labels Kitsuné and Washington Square Music, the New York City-based subdivision of the Razor & Tie label, which led to MOTHXR releasing their debut album, via Concord titled Centerfold, on February 26, 2016. In a review, The Guardian said the album had "genuine drama and terrific hooks".

=== Activism and political views ===
During the 2008 United States presidential election, Badgley supported Barack Obama. He and Blake Lively appeared in an Obama commercial as part of MoveOn's Youth Vote program, which aired during Gossip Girl on The CW, MTV, and Comedy Central.

In March 2010, the American Red Cross announced Badgley as a member of the National Celebrity Cabinet, a group of celebrities who promote Red Cross services. Badgley supported the Occupy Wall Street movement in 2011 and is an ally of the Black Lives Matter (BLM) movement. He wants police brutality dialogue to include female victims, and supports LGBTQ rights.

=== Podcast ===
On May 18, 2022, Badgley launched the podcast Podcrushed with cohosts Nava Kavelin and Sophie Ansari. The show explores the awkwardness, anxiety, heartbreak, and self-discovery that defines adolescence by inviting guests to share their middle school stories. Featured guests have included Drew Barrymore, Conan O'Brien, Jenna Ortega, Leighton Meester, Rainn Wilson, and Ariana Grande.

== Personal life ==
Badgley dated Gossip Girl co-star Blake Lively from 2007 to 2010, and actress Zoë Kravitz from 2011 to 2013. He began dating singer Domino Kirke in 2014, and the couple married in a New York courthouse on February 27, 2017. Through the marriage, Badgley became the stepfather of Kirke's son from a previous relationship, and became the brother-in-law to actress Jemima Kirke. Their first child together, a son, was born in August 2020. In September 2025, Badgley revealed that they had had twin sons.

In an interview, Badgley described how the BP oil spill prompted his exploration into the connection between justice and spirituality, and led him to the rainforests of Colombia and the teachings of Baháʼu'lláh and the Baháʼí Faith. Badgley has been a member of the Baha'i Faith since 2015.

== Filmography ==
=== Film ===
Key
†	Denotes films that have not yet been released

Year	Title	Role	Notes
2001	The Fluffer	Sean McGinnis (young)	
2004	Debating Robert Lee	Debater	
2006	John Tucker Must Die	Scott Tucker	
2007	Drive-Thru	Van	
2008	Forever Strong	Lars	
2009	The Stepfather	Michael Harding	
2010	Easy A	"Woodchuck" Todd	
2011	Margin Call	Seth Bregman	
2012	East of Eden	Cal Trask	Short Film
2012	Greetings from Tim Buckley	Jeff Buckley	
2014	Parts per Billion	Erik	
2015	Cymbeline	Posthumus	
2016	The Paper Store	Sigurd Rossdale	
2016	Adam Green's Aladdin	Prince of Monaco	
2021	Here Today	Rex	
2021	The Birthday Cake	Peeno	
TBA	You Deserve Each Other †	Nick Rose	
TBA	NDA	Scott Pursell	

=== Television ===
Year	Title	Role	Notes
1999	Will & Grace	Todd	Episode: "I Never Promised You an Olive Garden"
2000–2001	The Young and the Restless	Phillip "Chance" Chancellor	Main role
2000–2002	The Brothers García	Eddie Bauer	2 episodes
2000	Daddio	Todd	2 episodes
2002	The Nightmare Room	Mike	Episode: "My Name Is Evil"
2002	Do Over	Joel Larsen	Main role
2002	What I Like About You	Jake Wood	Episode: "Copy That"
2003	The Twilight Zone	Trace Malone	Episode: "Homecoming"
2004–2005	The Mountain	Sam Tunney	Main role
2006	The Bedford Diaries	Owen Gregory	Main role
2007–2012	Gossip Girl	Daniel "Dan" Humphrey	Main role
2015	The Slap	Jamie	2 episodes
2018–2025	You	Joseph “Joe” Goldberg	Main role; also producer; also director: "She's Not There"
TBA	Everyone in my family has killed someone	Ernest Cunningham	Main role; also producer

=== Video games ===
Year	Title	Role	Notes
1999	Mario Golf	Kid	Voice role
2000	Mario Tennis	Alex	Voice role
2005	Mario Tennis: Power Tour	Chris	Uncredited

=== Music videos ===
- "The Boy Is Mine" (2024), by Ariana Grande

== Awards and nominations ==
Year	Award	Category	Work	Result	Ref.
2001	Young Artist Award	Best Performance in a Daytime TV Series: Young Actor	The Young and the Restless	Nominated	
2008	Teen Choice Award	Choice TV Actor: Drama	Gossip Girl	Nominated	
2009	Teen Choice Award	Choice TV Actor: Drama	Gossip Girl	Nominated	
2010	Teen Choice Award	Choice Movie Actor: Horror/Thriller	The Stepfather	Nominated	
2010	Teen Choice Award	Choice TV Actor: Drama	Gossip Girl	Nominated	
2011	Teen Choice Award	Choice Movie Actor: Romantic Comedy	Easy A	Nominated	
2011	Teen Choice Award	Choice TV Actor: Drama	Gossip Girl	Nominated	
2011	Gotham Independent Film Award	Best Ensemble Performance	Margin Call	Nominated	
2011	Washington D.C. Area Film Critics Association Award	Best Cast	Margin Call	Nominated	
2011	San Diego Film Critics Society Award	Best Performance by an Ensemble	Margin Call	Nominated	
2011	Phoenix Film Critics Society Award	Best Ensemble Acting	Margin Call	Nominated	
2012	Independent Spirit Award	Robert Altman Award	Margin Call	Won	
2012	Teen Choice Award	Choice TV Actor: Drama	Gossip Girl	Nominated	
2013	Teen Choice Award	Choice TV Actor: Drama	Gossip Girl	Nominated	
2016	Manchester Film Festival	Jury Special Mention - Lead Actor	The Paper Store	Won	
2016	Oxford International Film Festival	Best Actor	The Paper Store	Won	
2019	MTV Movie & TV Awards	Best Villain	You	Nominated	
2019	Saturn Awards	Best Actor in Streaming Presentation	You	Nominated	
2022	Astra Awards	Best Actor in a Streaming Series, Drama	You	Nominated	
2023	Astra Awards	Best Actor in a Streaming Series, Drama	You	Nominated	
