= Wrath (2011 film) =

2011 horror film by Jonathan N. Dixon

- Theatrical release poster
- Directed by: Jonathan N Dixon
- Screenplay by: Jonathan N Dixon
- Produced by: Jonathan N Dixon; Luisa Clare
- Starring: Stef Dawson; Corey Page; William Emmons; Rebecca Ratcliff; Xavier Fernandez; Michael Windeyer; Charlie Falkner; Rod Ramsay
- Cinematography: Paul J Warren
- Edited by: John Binstead
- Music by: Guntis Sics
- Production companies: Mystery Road Pictures; Wrath Productions
- Distributed by: Lightning Entertainment
- Release date: 2011
- Running time: 96 minutes
- Country: Australia
- Language: English

Wrath is a 2011 Australian horror film written and directed by Jonathan N Dixon and starring Stef Dawson, Corey Page, William Emmons, Xavier Fernandez, Rebecca Ratcliff, Michael Windeyer, and Charlie Falkner. The film was inspired by revenge films of the 1970s, including The Last House on the Left and I Spit on Your Grave.

== Cast ==
- Stef Dawson as Leah Thompson
- Corey Page as Matthew Webster
- William Emmons as Erik
- Charlie Falkner as Max Thompson
- Michael Windeyer as William Thompson
- Rebecca Ratcliff as Caroline
- Xavier Fernández as Javier
- Bianca Bradey as Emma
- Jazz Cohn as Amelia
- Rod Ramsay as Edward Thompson

== Filming ==
Principal photography began in September 2010 in the Northern Rivers, and wrapped in late October 2010.

== Release ==
The film was well received by international distributors and sales agents but due to the subject matter it received mixed reviews. A worldwide release was planned with Arclight Films in 2011 but at the eleventh hour the deal fell apart after Mark Lindsay (president, sales and acquisitions) left the company. The film was subsequently released internationally on DVD and Pay TV through Lightning Entertainment in 2011.
