= The Paper Store (2016 film) =

- Theatrical release poster
- Directed by: Nicholas Gray
- Screenplay by: Nicholas Gray; Katharine Clark Gray
- Based on: 516 by Katharine Clark Gray
- Produced by: Jonathan Gray; John Grossman; Bonnie Timmermann
- Starring: Stef Dawson; Penn Badgley; Richard Kind
- Cinematography: Richard Sands
- Edited by: Ariel Roubinov
- Music by: Carl Cheeseman
- Production companies: Actium Pictures; Bonnie Timmermann Productions; Front Wheel Productions; Uncompromised Creative
- Release date: February 26, 2016 (Hollywood Reel Independent Film Festival)
- Running time: 97 minutes
- Country: United States
- Language: English

The Paper Store is a 2016 drama film directed by Nicholas Gray, and written by Gray and Katharine Clark Gray, adapted from the latter's play 516. The film is produced by Jonathan Gray, John Grossman (NYPS), and casting director Bonnie Timmermann and stars Stef Dawson, Penn Badgley, and Richard Kind.

A revenge tale about a former college student who forges essays for money, the grad student who becomes her lover, and the professor who discovers their scheme.

== Cast ==
- Stef Dawson as Annalee Monegan
- Penn Badgley as Sigurd Rossdale
- Richard Kind as Professor Marty Kane
- Clifton Dunn as Hooper
- Caitlin Mehner as Emily
- Kenton Cummings as Reynaldo
- Patrick Hogue as Bishop

== Production ==
The Paper Store is a film adaptation of Katharine Clark Gray's play 516 (five-sixteen), workshopped at the New York International Fringe Festival in 2007, with four out of five stars on Time Out (magazine). 516 received its professional debut through Philadelphia Theater Workshop in 2010, culminating in plans to adapt the play into a film shortly thereafter.

Katharine and her husband, Nicholas Gray, were producing partners at A Chip & A Chair Films (If You Could Say It In Words) for eight years before branching off to create Uncompromised Creative. The company partnered with producers Jonathan Gray, Bonnie Timmermann, John Grossman, executive producer Bruce Meyerson, and co-executive producers Actium Pictures and Matthew Bronson, to make The Paper Store, Uncompromised Creative's feature debut.

Filming took place in New York City and Syracuse, NY. The interiors of all three leads' homes were shot on the re-decorated apartment sets from Broad City (2014).

== Release ==
Video on-demand-rights were licensed by Flix Premiere. The film was released on June 9, 2017, in the United States and June 17 in the United Kingdom. On July 24, 2018, the movie became widely available via Amazon and iTunes on V.O.D., with DVD release to follow on October 9, 2018.

== Reception ==
- Named Best Drama of 2016 by the LA Film Review. The review called the script "expertly adapted" from its source material, and declared that the film "gives us a world that is far from black and white — one where it’s really easy to claim high standards, while simultaneously betraying them with the most plausible of explanations."
- The Manchester Evening News named The Paper Store as one of the "six best films you have to see" of the Manchester Film Festival, and FranklyMyDear UK described it as "the ultimate tale of romance and revenge set in academia."
- The Film Stage said that "few narrative films have touched on [the rising cost of higher education] so pointedly or deftly as The Paper Store".

== Accolades ==
2016

- Manchester International Film Festival, with a Jury Special Mention for Lead Actor (Penn Badgley).
- Hollywood Reel Independent Film Festival
- Manhattan Film Festival - named Best Dramatic Feature
- Oxford International Film Festival official awarded Best Actress to Stef Dawson and Best Actor to Penn Badgley
- New Filmmakers NY
- Fort Worth Indie Film Showcase - won Best Foreign Drama, "foreign" referring to productions outside Texas
- Pittsburgh Independent Film Festival
