= Mascara (film) =

- Directed by: Linda Kandel
- Written by: Linda Kandel
- Produced by: Crocker Coulson
- Starring: Ione Skye; Lumi Cavazos; Amanda de Cadenet
- Cinematography: François Dagenais
- Edited by: Jane Pia Abramowitz
- Music by: Steven Hufsteter
- Production company: Anamorph Films
- Distributed by: Phaedra Cinema
- Release date: 7 May 1999
- Running time: 94 minutes
- Country: United States
- Language: English

Mascara is a 1999 American comedy-drama film directed by Linda Kandel, starring Ione Skye, Lumi Cavazos and Amanda de Cadenet.

== Cast ==
- Ione Skye as Rebecca
- Lumi Cavazos as Laura
- Amanda de Cadenet as Jennifer
- Steve Schub as Donnie
- Steve Jones as Nick
- Barry Del Sherman as Ken
- Tara Subkoff as Daphne
- Corey Page as Andrew
- Karen Black as Aunt Eloise

== Reception ==
Joe Leydon of Variety called the film "reasonably well-acted but thoroughly inconsequential". Bill Gibron of PopMatters called the film a "chick flick that out distances Lifetime and Oxygen in the communal crisis arena." Don Houston of DVD Talk rated the film 2 stars out of 5. Kevin Thomas of the Los Angeles Times wrote that Kandel "reveals admirable commitment to her characters but is not sufficiently detached from them to provide her material with depth and perspective."

Marla Matzer of the Los Angeles Daily News rated the film 1.5 stars and called it "nicely made, well-acted independent film that unfortunately just doesn't have much to say." Jack Mathews of the New York Daily News rated the film 1 star and called it "tedious". TV Guide wrote that while "not every scene works", the film's "cumulative effect" is "very potent."
