= William Slade (valet) =

Valet to Abraham Lincoln (died 1868)

William Slade (died March 16, 1868) was the White House usher, which at the time was "one of the highest posts available to a black Washingtonian"; he acted as valet, confidential messenger, doorkeeper, and majordomo to Abraham Lincoln, and remained in charge of the White House after Lincoln died (t. 1861 – 1868).

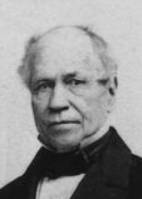
Only known likeness of William Slade during his lifetime.

== Career ==
Previously Slade had kept a boardinghouse in Washington and served as a messenger in the Treasury Department. When Slade became Lincoln's majordomo, he became trusted by Lincoln with confidential secrets. In his 1942 book They Knew Lincoln, historian John Washington calls Slade the “confidential messenger and confidant” to the President, wherein the President would give Slade private missions to perform and in exchange Slade "kept the closest mouth on all public affairs and would never discuss any of Lincoln’s plans or business with anyone." After his death, Slade's daughter recorded that her father had destroyed some old documents of Lincoln's. In addition, Lincoln used to test the lines of some of his speeches out on Slade.

He was an elder of a black church, the 15th Street Presbyterian Church in Washington. Slade was also an activist within his community. He urged Lincoln to give Washington D.C.'s African American men a say over the officers who were selected for their regiments. He also was active in arguing for the right to vote, and he corresponded with Frederick Douglass about the Johnson White House after Lincoln's death.

== In popular culture ==
In the 2012 film Lincoln directed by Steven Spielberg, Slade was played by Stephen McKinley Henderson.
