= Robert Litz =

American dramatist

Robert Joseph Litz (born October 3, 1950 in Cleveland, Ohio – died October 10, 2012) was an American playwright, screenwriter, director and critic.

== Biography ==
The only son of William E. Litz (1917–2007) and Mary Millik Litz (1920-2016), Robert Litz was of Hungarian and Polish background. He was raised in Cleveland's Mount Pleasant neighborhood and graduated from St. Ignatius High School in 1968 with Classical Honors. He attended college at Boston University, where he began as a pre-med student only to switch later on to English and History. During his college days, he was the editor of the literary magazine and graduated magna cum laude in 1972. Afterwards Litz attended Harvard University, where he received an MTS, American Studies in 1975.

After trying a career as a poet, Litz took a job as press agent for the New England Repertory Theatre, a small theater company in Worcester, Massachusetts, where he also worked as a stage and production manager. After an actor without understudy had to withdraw from a production one week before opening, the company drafted him to fill in for the actor and he eventually became part of the acting ensemble.

With the New England Repertory, Litz had roles in Dracula, Chekhov's The Seagull, Molière's The School for Wives, Kyogen comedies, and was an understudy in American Buffalo. After this experience, he shifted from writing poetry to writing plays early in the 1980s, signing with his first and longtime theater agent, Lois Berman, owner of the boutique agency that represented such playwrights as Sam Shepard, Barbara Fields, Lee Blessing, and Emily Mann.

Litz's breakthrough as a playwright came in 1983, when his play Great Divide, was selected for The National Playwright's Conference at the Eugene O'Neill Theater Center in Waterford, Connecticut, where he had August Wilson and John Patrick Shanley as roommates. Great Divide was subsequently produced off-Broadway at the New York Theatre Workshop in 1984..

During the rest of the 1980s, Litz moved to New York City and began working in off-Broadway and regional theater productions. He also wrote, produced and directed movies and TV shows. He also traveled extensively through North America, East Asia, Southeast Asia, Europe, and lived briefly in Hong Kong and Cambridge, England.

He resided between Los Angeles, California; Princeton, New Jersey; and Berkeley, California.

== Some of Robert Litz's plays ==
- 2007 - One Fell Swoop. The Elephant Theatre Company, Hollywood, California.
- 2006 - Pilgrims in Vienna. Montreal Festival Baroque (Canada) and the Brugges Festival (Belgium).
- 2004 - One World. The Elephant Theatre Company, Hollywood, California. (2004 NAACP nominee for Best Original Play and Ensemble
- 1997 - Mobile Hymn - Santa Monica Playhouse, Santa Monica, California. (1997 Drama-Logue Award for Best Play and Ensemble)
- 1997 - Douglas - Northlight Repertory Theatre, Chicago, Illinois. (1991 Portland's Critics Circle Best Play; 1989 Gavel Award nominee)
- 1989 - Domino - New York Theatre Workshop, New York.
- 1983 - Great Divide - New York Theatre Workshop (after opening at the Eugene O'Neill Theater Center).
- 1981 - Tangles - Pittsburgh Public Theater, Pittsburgh, Pennsylvania.

== Robert Litz's partial filmography ==
- 2007 - Alta California - Writer (Pre-production).
- 2006 - Ten Tricks - Producer.
- 2004 - A&E Biography: George Washington, Founding Father - Writer. (TV)
- 2004 - A&E Biography: Benjamin Franklin, Citizen of the World - Writer. (TV)
- 2003 - A&E Biography: Andrew Jackson, A Man for the People - Writer. (TV)
- 2000 - A&E Biography: John Travolta - Writer. (TV)
- 2000 - Maxine's Christmas Carol - Co-writer. (TV)
- 2000 - Sinbad: Beyond the Veil of Mists - Producer.
- 1998 - A&E: In Pursuit of Space - Writer. (TV)
- 1998 - World War II: The race to rule the skies - Writer. (TV)
- 1996 - America's Flying Aces: The Blue Angels 50th Anniversary - Writer. (TV)
- 1993 - House of Cards - Writer.
- 1989 - Medium Straight - Writer.
- 1985 - Rappin' - Writer.

== Selected works ==
Four Plays about Histories, (Metron Publications 2016) ISBN 978-1603770910

- Mobile Hymn
- Great Divide
- Cassatt & Degas
- The Bear and His Monkey
