= Dramatists Guild Foundation =

- Company type: Non-profit
- Available in: English
- Headquarters: New York City, {{{location_country}}}
- Key people: Andrew Lippa (President) Rachel Routh (Executive Director)
- Website: https://dgf.org/
- Current status: Active

The Dramatists Guild Foundation (DGF) is a public charity. According to its website, its mission is "to aid and nurture writers for the theater; to fund non-profit theaters producing contemporary American works; and to heighten awareness, appreciation, and support of theater across the country."

== Overview ==
Dramatists Guild Foundation (DGF) is a national charity that fuels the future of American theater by supporting the writers who create it. DGF fosters playwrights, composers, lyricists, and book-writers at all stages of their careers. DGF sponsor educational programs; provide awards, grants, and stipends; offer free space to create new works; and give emergency aid to writers in need. By supporting and nurturing the creators of today, DGF are able to protect the stories of tomorrow.

== Programs ==
The Legacy Project is a set of filmed interviews between an experienced dramatist and an emerging one. Volume I was released in 2011. The videos are a resource for students, theater-lovers, and the general public. Producers include Nancy Ford, Carol Hall, Peter Ratray and Jonathan Reynolds. The interviews are filmed and directed by Jeremy Levine and Landon Van Soest of Transient Pictures.

Volume I features Lee Adams with Brian Yorkey, Edward Albee with Will Eno, Jerry Bock and Sheldon Harnick with David Zippel, A.R. Gurney with Itamar Moses, John Kander with Kirsten Childs, Arthur Laurents with David Saint, Stephen Sondheim with Adam Guettel, Joseph Stein with Lin-Manuel Miranda, Charles Strouse with Michael John LaChiusa, Lanford Wilson with Craig Lucas.

Volume II features Terrence McNally with Annie Baker, Tina Howe with Sarah Ruhl, Lynn Ahrens and Stephen Flaherty with DGF President Andrew Lippa, Frank Gilroy with Doug Wright, Thomas Meehan with Douglas Carter Beane, Charles Fuller with Lynn Nottage, Mary Rodgers with Marsha Norman, Jules Feiffer with Paul Rudnick, and Tom Jones with Harvey Schmidt.

Volume III features Tony Kushner with Michael Friedman, Gretchen Cryer and Nancy Ford with Georgia Stitt, Micki Grant with Charlayne Woodard, James Lapine with Lisa Kron, Larry Kramer with George C. Wolfe, Alan Menken with Kristen Anderson-Lopez, John Patrick Shanley with Stephen Adly Guirgis, John Weidman with J.T. Rogers, Stephen Schwartz with Jeanine Tesori, and Stephen Sondheim with Adam Guettel.

DGF also hosts the Traveling Masters program that partners professional writers with American theaters across the country. The writer travels to the theater and conducts workshops and leads discussions with local dramatists.

The DGF Fellows program is a year-long intensive for playwrights, composers, lyricists, and book-writers.

In April 2018, DGF launched its New Voices program, which brings trained teaching artists into classrooms to lead students in the collaborative creation of their own plays.

In 2019, DGF opened the Music Hall to provide a free space for writers to feel inspired and supported.

== Grants ==
The Dramatists Guild Foundation awards many types of grants for theater writers:

Emergency Grants - provides emergency financial assistance to individual playwrights, composers, lyricists, and librettists in dire need of funds due to severe hardship or unexpected illness.

Housing Assistance Grants - one-time grants to help theater writers with housing expenses that have accumulated due to the COVID-19 pandemic. DGF is committed to preventing evictions and displacement of dramatic writers as well as helping them rebuild their lives during the period of recovery from the pandemic.

Steven Schwartzberg Health & Wellness Grants - provide financial support for mental health and wellness services for theater writers. These funds are unrestricted, for the writer to use to best serve their individual needs.

== See also ==
The Dramatists Guild of America
