= Jailbait (2004 film) =

- Theatrical release poster
- Directed by: Brett C. Leonard
- Written by: Brett C. Leonard
- Produced by: Rene Bastion
- Starring: Michael Pitt; Stephen Adly Guirgis
- Distributed by: Warner Bros. Lightyear Entertainment
- Release dates: May 3, 2004 (Tribeca Film Festival); August 4, 2006 (United States)
- Running time: 89 minutes
- Country: United States
- Language: English

Jailbait is a 2004 psychodrama film written and directed by Brett C. Leonard. It stars Stephen Adly Guirgis and Michael Pitt and is set in an unnamed prison in California. The film received numerous independent film nominations and was awarded the Lake Placid Film Festival Grand Jury Prize.

== Plot ==
Randy (Pitt), a 20-year-old convict, is taken to his cell by a Correctional Officer (David Zayas). He is greeted by his new cellmate, Jake (Guirgis), a veteran prisoner serving a life sentence. Randy explains that he is serving 25 years for his third felony after two counts of marijuana possession: spray painting his neighbor's brand new Mercedes-Benz and causing over $5,000 worth of damages.

The next morning, Jake begins telling Randy a story about the worst sexual encounter he ever had. The story terrifies Randy, who begins to realize that Jake's motive may be more than just friendship. The conversation turns toward how Jake feels homosexuality is a state of mind. The breakfast bell rings and the story is interrupted, much to Randy's relief. Jake seems to drop the topic and return to his more friendly demeanor. However, Randy is quickly brought back to the horrible reality of his situation when Jake forces him to wear his shirt in a feminine style and to hold his hand as they go to lunch (See prison sexuality).

Several months later, Randy's mother (Laila Robins) visits him at the prison. Randy lies to her and says his cell mate and he are getting along well. The brief visit only highlights Randy's isolation, as his mother is powerless to do anything to help him.

After Jake pressures Randy to tell him about his worst sexual experience, Randy turns it around by claiming that Jake was his best sexual partner, revealing what was happening offscreen between the two of them all along. At first, Jake seems touched, only to quickly turn around and beat Randy, accusing him of playing mind games.

Moments later, Jake again prods the now bruised and bloody Randy to tell him about his "worst fuck." Randy tells Jake about his first sexual experience: he was 17 and drunk in a Tijuana strip club, and paid a stripper $35 for oral sex with a condom on in a room above the dance floor. Afterwards, he saw the same stripper perform a striptease in which she revealed that she was a pre-operational transsexual. Randy then tells Jake that he "thought that was the worst it was ever going to get," insinuating that his current situation as Jake's sex slave is far worse. Jake appears angry and offended, but then seems guilt ridden. Again, Jake snaps out of his more tender feelings and, replacing them with cruelty, forces Randy to perform oral sex on him. Afterward, Jake makes pleasant conversation about their ongoing backgammon game as Randy lies in the fetal position in his bunk.

That night, as Jake sleeps, Randy creeps silently to his cellmate's bedside, preparing to stab him in the throat with a pencil as the older man sleeps. Randy hesitates and Jake wakes up. Jake doesn't attempt to physically restrain Randy, but instead tells him that he doesn't have the heart to kill a man in cold blood, and that even if he did he wouldn't kill him. Jake tells Randy that he is all that Randy has, that he is his protection, alluding perhaps to an even more brutal sexual slavery among other inmates were he not tied down to Jake. He sincerely tells Randy that he is his only friend. Jake then tells Randy to go back to his bed and think about all the things he will do when he is finally released.

Jake then tells the now nearly tearful Randy why his mother stopped writing back; she had died and no one told him. The prison authorities had refused to let him go to his mother's funeral. Jake then tells Randy to make sure that he gets to see his mother's funeral, that it is very important to be able to say goodbye.

== Cast ==
- Stephen Adly Guirgis as Jake
- Michael Pitt as Randy
- Laila Robins as Mother
- David Zayas as Guard
- Eric Trosman as Prison Guard
- Brian Albanese as Prisoner
- Brad Lee Wind as Skinhead
- Ray Wineteer as Prisoner

== See also ==
- Prison Sexuality
- Three Strikes Law
- Mandatory Sentencing
- Michael Pitt
