= Stephen McKinley Henderson =

American actor (born 1949)

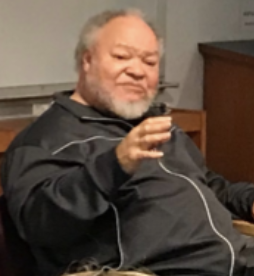
- Henderson presenting at Amherst Central High School on March 29, 2018
- Born: August 31, 1949 (age 77); Kansas City, Missouri, U.S.
- Education: Lincoln University, Missouri (attended); Juilliard School (attended); North Carolina School of the Arts (BFA); Purdue University, West Lafayette (MA)
- Occupation: Actor
- Years active: 1979–present
- Spouse: Pamela Reed (m. 1978)
- Children: 1

Stephen McKinley Henderson (born August 31, 1949) is an American actor. Henderson trained at Juilliard School for acting and later became a resident member of the Repertory Theatre of St. Louis from 1976 to 1981. He came to prominence as a character actor often performing the plays of August Wilson. He has received nominations for two Tony Awards, a Drama Desk Award, and two Screen Actors Guild Awards. In 2021 Vulture named Henderson as one of "The 32 Greatest Character Actors Working Today".

Henderson made his Broadway debut in Wilson's King Hedley II in 2001. He earned Tony Award nominations for his performances in Wilson's Fences in 2010 and Stephen Adly Guirgis's Between Riverside and Crazy in 2023. He acted in the Broadway revival of A Raisin in the Sun in 2014. He made his film debut in A Pleasure Doing Business (1979) and has appeared in Extremely Loud & Incredibly Close (2011), Lincoln (2012), Fences (2016), Manchester by the Sea (2016), Lady Bird (2017), Dune (2021), Causeway (2022), Beau Is Afraid (2023), and Civil War (2024).

His television debut came in 1984 in PBS's The Killing Floor. He has appeared in Law & Order (1995–2010), Law & Order: Special Victims Unit (2005–2006), The Newsroom (2013), The Blacklist (2018), Wu-Tang: An American Saga (2019–2020), Devs (2020), and A Man on the Inside (2024).

== Early life and education ==
Stephen McKinley Henderson was born on August 31, 1949, in Kansas City, Missouri, the son of Ruby Naomi and Elihue Henderson.

He spent a year at Lincoln University, Missouri and was originally part of Group 1 at the Juilliard School Drama Division before he left. He finished his BFA in Acting at the North Carolina School of the Arts (1972). He later studied at Purdue University, where he received his Master of Arts in Theatre (1977). He spent summer sessions at Rose Bruford College in London and William Esper Studios in New York City. Henderson is included in the List of Purdue University alumni.

== Career ==
=== Stage ===
Henderson won the 2015 Obie Award for Best Actor for his starring role of Walter "Pops" Washington in the Atlantic Theatre Company and Second Stage productions of the Pulitzer Prize-winning play Between Riverside and Crazy. He portrayed Jim Bono in the 2010 Broadway revival of August Wilson's Fences, starring Denzel Washington, for which Henderson received a nomination for a Tony Award as a supporting actor, as well as the Richard Seff Award from Actor's Equity. He reprised the role in Washington's 2016 film adaptation.

On Broadway, he performed in Drowning Crow, the revival of Ma Rainey's Black Bottom, and the premiere of King Hedley II. Henderson is recognized as a veteran performer of August Wilson's oeuvre.

His signature August Wilson role is the gossipy Turnbo in Jitney, for which he won a Drama Desk Award as part of the ensemble. He had created the role in the 1996 premiere at the Pittsburgh Public Theater, then honed it in other regional theaters before its arrival Off-Broadway in 2000. Though it did not transfer to Broadway, he and the core of the cast took Jitney to London, where it won the 2002 Olivier Award for best new play. In addition, he appeared in A Raisin in the Sun and directed Zooman and the Sign.

In 2005 Henderson appeared as Pontius Pilate in the production of The Last Days of Judas Iscariot directed by Philip Seymour Hoffman at the Public Theater. He appeared as Van Helsing in the Broadway production of Dracula, the Musical.

In 2023, he was presented with a Lifetime Achievement Award at the Lucille Lortel Awards ceremony.

=== Screen ===
Henderson's films include his role as Cooper's husband in the TV film Marie (1985), Bobo in A Raisin in the Sun (1989), Arthur in Everyday People (2004), Lester in the film Tower Heist (2011), and White House servant William Slade in Steven Spielberg's film Lincoln (2012), along with roles in the films Keane (2004) and If You Could Say It in Words (2008).

In 2016, Henderson appeared in Kenneth Lonergan's film Manchester by the Sea. The following year, he played the role of Father Leviatch in Greta Gerwig's 2017 film Lady Bird, and in 2021 he appeared in Dune.

In addition to his films, Henderson was a series regular on the Fox series New Amsterdam, which premiered in early 2008. His other television work includes Law & Order, Law & Order: Special Victims Unit, The Newsroom, Law & Order: Criminal Intent, Tyler Perry's House of Payne, Third Watch, Blue Bloods, and Devs.

== Personal life ==
Henderson married Pamela Reed. They have a child together.

== Filmography ==
=== Film ===
Key
†	Denotes works that have not yet been released

Year	Title	Role(s)	Notes
1979	A Pleasure Doing Business	Bank teller	
1985	Marie	Cooper's husband	
2004	Keane	Garage employee	
2006	Waltzing Anna	Pete	
2008	If You Could Say It in Words	Baseball fan	
2009	The Good Heart	Psychiatrist	
2011	Tower Heist	Lester Day	
2011	Extremely Loud & Incredibly Close	Walt the locksmith	
2012	Red Hook Summer	Deacon Yancy	
2012	Lincoln	William Slade	
2014	Da Sweet Blood of Jesus	Deacon Yancy	
2014	The Romans	Birdman	
2016	Manchester by the Sea	Mr. Emery	
2016	The American Side	Stickney	
2016	All at Once	Robert	
2016	Fences	Jim Bono	
2017	Lady Bird	Father Leviatch	
2019	Native Son	Mr. Green	
2019	The True Adventures of Wolfboy	Nicholas	
2020	Bruised	Pops	
2021	Dune	Thufir Hawat	
2022	Causeway	Dr. Lucas	
2023	Beau Is Afraid	Therapist	
2024	Dune: Part Two	Thufir Hawat	Deleted scenes
2024	Civil War	Sammy	
2025	The Dutchman	Dr. Amiri	
2025	A King's Curtain	Mell	Short film
2025	Good Fortune	Azrael	
2026	The Mandalorian and Grogu	Gatori (voice)	
TBA	Dedicated to Morris Burke †		Filming

=== Television ===
Year	Title	Role(s)	Notes
1984	The Killing Floor	James Cheeks	Television film
1989	A Raisin in the Sun	Bobo	Television film
1995–2010	Law & Order	Judge Marc Kramer	7 episodes
1995	New York News	Sherman Wakes	Episode: "Fun City"
2000	Third Watch	Boudreaux	Episode: "Know Thyself"
2001	Law & Order: Criminal Intent	Abernathy	Episode: "The Faithful"
2004	Everyday People	Arthur	Television film
2005–2006	Law & Order: Special Victims Unit	Judge Bernard	2 episodes
2006	Conviction	Judge	2 episodes
2008	New Amsterdam	Omar York	Main cast, 8 episodes
2008	Brotherhood		2 episodes
2008	Tyler Perry's House of Payne	Fred Jones	Episode: Father's Day
2012	Blue Bloods	Judge Harlan Haywood	Episode: "Reagan V. Reagan"
2012	The Newsroom	Solomon Hancock	3 episodes
2012	Elementary	Groundskeeper Edison	Episode: "One Way to Get Off"
2017	Survivor's Remorse	Solomon	Episode: "Future Plans"
2018	The Resident	Darryl Phillips	Episode: "The Elopement"
2018	The Blacklist	Dr. Francis Woerner	Episode: "Nicholas T. Moore (No. 110)"
2018	Strangers	Billy Caldwell	2 episodes
2018	Fear the Walking Dead	Clayton	Episode: "Blackjack"
2019	Proven Innocent	Judge Fry	Episode: "Acceptable Losses"
2019–2021	Wu-Tang: An American Saga	Uncle Hollis	3 episodes
2020	Devs	Stewart	Miniseries; 8 episodes
2020	Run	John	Episode: "Run"
2024	Extended Family	Dr. Eldridge Davenport	Episode: "The Consequences of Gaming"
2024–present	A Man on the Inside	Calbert Graham	17 episodes
2024	The Madness	Isiah	Miniseries

=== Theatre ===
Year	Title	Role(s)	Venue
1986	A Raisin in the Sun	Bobo	Union Square Theatre, Off-Broadway
1994	Zooman and the Sign	Emmett Tate	McGinn/Cazale Theatre, Off-Broadway
2000	Jitney	Turnbo	Second Stage Theater, Off-Broadway
2001	King Hedley II	Stool Pigeon	Virginia Theatre, Broadway
2003	Ma Rainey's Black Bottom	Slow Drag	Royale Theatre, Broadway
2004	Drowning Crow	Sammy Bow	Biltmore Theatre, Broadway
2004–2005	Dracula, the Musical	Abraham Van Helsing	Belasco Theatre, Broadway
2005	The Last Days of Judas Iscariot	Pontius Pilate/Uncle Pino	The Public Theater, Off-Broadway
2006	Seven Guitars	Red Carter	Peter Norton Space, Off-Broadway
2007	King Hedley II	Elmore	Peter Norton Space, Off-Broadway
2010	Fences	Jim Bono	Cort Theatre, Broadway
2014	A Raisin in the Sun	Bobo	Ethel Barrymore Theatre, Broadway
2014	Between Riverside and Crazy	Walter "Pops" Washington	Linda Gross Theater, Off-Broadway
2015	Between Riverside and Crazy	Walter "Pops" Washington	Second Stage Theater, Off-Broadway
2017	A Doll's House, Part 2	Torvald Helmer	John Golden Theatre, Broadway
2022–2023	Between Riverside and Crazy	Walter "Pops" Washington	Helen Hayes Theatre, Broadway

== Awards and nominations ==
Year	Award	Category	Nominee	Result
2000	Drama Desk Award	Outstanding Ensemble Performance	Jitney	Won
2010	Tony Award	Best Featured Actor in a Play	Fences	Nominated
2015	Drama Desk Award	Outstanding Actor in a Play	Between Riverside and Crazy	Nominated
2015	Drama League Award	Distinguished Performance	Between Riverside and Crazy	Nominated
2015	Outer Critics Circle Award	Outstanding Actor in a Play	Between Riverside and Crazy	Nominated
2015	Lucille Lortel Award	Outstanding Lead Actor in a Play	Between Riverside and Crazy	Won
2016	Screen Actors Guild Award	Outstanding Cast in a Motion Picture	Fences	Nominated
2017	Screen Actors Guild Award	Outstanding Cast in a Motion Picture	Lady Bird	Nominated
2023	Tony Award	Best Actor in a Play	Between Riverside and Crazy	Nominated
2023	Lucille Lortel Award	Lifetime Achievement Award		Won
2023	Drama Desk Award	Harold Prince Lifetime Achievement Award		Won
