= Between Riverside and Crazy =

2014 play written by Stephen Adly Guirgis

- Written by: Stephen Adly Guirgis
- Genre: Drama

Premiere
- Date: July 31, 2014
- Place: Atlantic Theater Company; New York City

Between Riverside and Crazy is a 2014 play by playwright, screenwriter, director, and actor Stephen Adly Guirgis. The play won the 2015 Pulitzer Prize for Drama, the 2015 New York Drama Critics Circle Award for Best Play, the 2015 Lucille Lortel Award for Outstanding Play, the 2015 Outer Critics Circle Award for Outstanding New Off-Broadway Play and the 2015 Off Broadway Alliance Award for Best New Play.

== Plot ==
Walter "Pops" Washington is a retired New York City policeman. His wife has died and his son, "Junior", has just been released from jail. They live in a rent-controlled apartment on Riverside Drive in New York City. Junior's girlfriend, Lulu, and Oswaldo, a recovering addict, also spend time at the apartment. Walter has been pursuing a discrimination suit against the Police Department, because he was accidentally shot by another police officer.

== Cast ==
Characters	Off-Broadway debut (2014)	Broadway debut (2022)
Pops	Stephen McKinley Henderson	Stephen McKinley Henderson
Oswaldo	Victor Almanzar	Victor Almanzar
Lulu	Rosal Colón	Rosal Colón
Junior	Ray Anthony Thomas	Common
Church Lady	Liza Colón-Zayas	Liza Colón-Zayas
Detective Audrey	Elizabeth Canavan	Elizabeth Canavan
Lieutenant Caro	Michael Rispoli	Gary Perez

== Production history ==
The play opened Off-Broadway at the Atlantic Theater Company's Linda Gross Theater, with previews that began on July 10, 2014, and a premiere on July 31. Its initial run was extended from August 16 to 23. A Second Stage Theatre production ran from February 11, 2015, until March 22, 2015, at the company's Tony Kiser Theatre, with previews beginning on January 16.

The play was directed by Austin Pendleton, with a cast that featured Stephen McKinley Henderson as Walter "Pops" Washington, Victor Almanzar (Oswaldo), Rosal Colon (Lulu), Liza Colón-Zayas (Church Lady), and Ron Cephas Jones (Junior) (Ray Anthony Thomas played Junior in the 2014 production). Michael Rispoli played the chief antagonist (Lt. Caro) and Elizabeth Canavan played the ambivalent role of Pops' old partner (Detective O'Connor)

The play was produced at the American Conservatory Theater, Geary Theater in San Francisco in September 2015. Directed by Irene Lewis, the cast featured Carl Lumbly as Pops, Catherine Castellanos as the Church Lady, Samuel Ray Gates as Junior, Elia Monte-Brown as Lulu, and Lakin Valdez as Oswaldo.

Studio Theatre in Washington, DC, staged the play from January 13, 2016, to February 28, 2016.

Artists Repertory Theatre, located in Portland, Oregon, staged Between Riverside and Crazy from March 4 to April 1, 2018.

Speakeasy Stage Company, located in Boston, Massachusetts, staged Between Riverside and Crazy from September 7 to October 6, 2018, starring Tyrees Allen (Pops), Alejandro Simoes (Oswaldo), Stewart Evan Smith (Junior), Octavia Chavez-Richmond (Lulu), Celeste Oliva (Church Lady), Maureen Keiller (Det. O'Connor), and Lewis D. Wheeler (Lt. Caro).

American Stage Company, located in St. Petersburg, Florida, staged Between Riverside and Crazy from October 3 to November 4, 2018.

The play made its Broadway debut at the Hayes Theater in previews on November 30, 2022, and officially opened on December 19. The production was directed by Austin Pendleton and featured much of the original off-Broadway cast. The production closed on February 19, 2023.

== Critical response ==
Jesse Green, in his review for New York Magazine, wrote: "Stephen Adly Guirgis... chooses the right kind of worlds to write about: parallel to, but in many ways hidden from, our own, strange enough to fascinate yet recognizable enough to hit home....The play is completely compelling even before its primary dramatic gears start turning..."

Marilyn Stasio, in her review for Variety, wrote: "You have to wonder what those out-of-towners will make of 'Between Riverside and Crazy', the scribe’s latest love/hate song to this impossible town and its outlandish citizenry. Some might be baffled by the rancorous real-estate battles between landlords and tenants of Gotham's rent-controlled apartments. But everyone's bound to be captivated by Guirgis's loudmouthed locals and the terrific ensemble players... If anyone can handle the scribe's idiom — a warm, rich dialect that comes right off the city streets — these are the guys."

The TheaterMania reviewer commented on the set: "Pendleton helps us to see how the pieces fit together, with scenes often bleeding from one to the next. Walt Spangler's mammoth rotating set... helps to create these moments. He's had to condense the set for the smaller uptown stage, eliminating a half-bath and moving the furniture in tighter. This creates an overstuffed feeling appropriate for an Upper West Side apartment continuously occupied for several decades. A late scene in which the set continues to rotate as the actors move from room to room has a cinematic agility that is rarely achieved onstage."

== Awards and nominations ==
Year	Award Ceremony	Category	Nominee	Result	Ref.
2015	Pulitzer Prize for Drama			Won	
2015	New York Drama Critics' Circle Award	Best Play		Won	
2015	Drama League Award	Outstanding Production of a Play		Nominated	
2015	Drama Desk Award	Outstanding Play		Nominated	
2015	Drama Desk Award	Outstanding Actor in a Play	Stephen McKinley Henderson	Nominated	
2015	Drama Desk Award	Outstanding Director of a Play	Austin Pendleton	Nominated	
2015	Lucille Lortel Award	Outstanding Play		Won	
2015	Lucille Lortel Award	Outstanding Director	Austin Pendleton	Nominated	
2015	Lucille Lortel Award	Outstanding Lead Actor in a Play	Stephen McKinley Henderson	Won	
2015	Lucille Lortel Award	Outstanding Featured Actress in a Play	Liza Colón-Zayas	Won	
2015	Lucille Lortel Award	Outstanding Featured Actor in a Play	Victor Almanzar	Nominated	
2015	Lucille Lortel Award	Outstanding Scenic Design	Walt Spangler	Nominated	
2015	Outer Critics Circle Award	Outstanding New Off-Broadway Play		Won	
2015	Outer Critics Circle Award	Outstanding Actor in a Play	Stephen McKinley Henderson	Nominated	
2015	Obie Award	Performance	Stephen McKinley Henderson	Won	
2015	Off Broadway Alliance Award	Best New Play		Won	
2015	Off Broadway Alliance Award	Legend of Off Broadway Honoree	Austin Pendleton	Won	
2023	Tony Awards	Best Play		Nominated	
2023	Tony Awards	Best Actor in a Play	Stephen McKinley Henderson	Nominated	

The Pulitzer Prize committee called Between Riverside and Crazy "a nuanced, beautifully written play about a retired police officer faced with eviction that uses dark comedy to confront questions of life and death."
