= In Arabia We'd All Be Kings =

Play by Stephen Adly Guirgis

- Written by: Stephen Adly Guirgis
- Characters: Holy Roller; Lenny; Greer; Mrs. Reyes; Demaris; Steven Schub Daisy; Charlie; Skank; Chickie; Sammy; Jake
- Original language: English
- Setting: New York City

Premiere
- Place premiered: Center Stage, New York, 1999

In Arabia We'd All Be Kings is a dramatic play set in New York City, written by Stephen Adly Guirgis. It chronicles the demise of a group of individuals living in New York's Hell's Kitchen around the time before Rudy Giuliani's efforts to clean up the city. Out of work and strapped for money, the lives of these individuals revolve around a local bar and their misguided hopes and dreams. The play deals primarily with issues of commercialism, hope, and friendship.

== Plot ==
Lenny is a recently released ex-convict. Despite his imposing size, he was gang raped repeatedly while incarcerated and struggles to find his manhood on the outside. Daisy, his alcoholic girlfriend, craves a “real” life with a “real” man and abandons him at a seedy bar in pursuit of some cheap Chinese takeout. At the bar is Skank, a former failed actor turned junkie, who is trying to outlast the rain storm and get a buyback from the long-missing Irish bartender as he begins to go through withdrawals. Also at the bar is Sammy, an old, dying guilt-ridden drunk who exists somewhere between reality and the afterlife. DeMaris, a seventeen-year-old gun-brandishing single mother, wants to learn to turn tricks. She enlists the aid of Chickie, Skank’s girlfriend, a young crackhead hooker who plays Go Fish with the simple-minded day bartender Charlie, who thinks he’s a Jedi warrior and who buys meals for Chickie because he loves her and because he lives for the day they can go out someday, “just as friends.” The owner of the bar is Jake. The place was his father’s before him, and after thirty years, he longs for the chance to leave “this sewer” for a re-invented life in Florida. The real-estate boom, “gentrification” and the emergence of Disney in Times Square affords him that opportunity. Unaware that their last piece of home is about to be pulled out from under them, the bar patrons struggle on. Their sense of humor, their misguided hopes and dreams, and their lack of self-pity are badges that are tattooed to their souls. They will all, before the end, demand and take the chance to face head on their complicated and sad truths.

== Characters ==
Chickie and Skank, a pair of crackheads. Charlie, a mentally disabled barman, sees himself as a Jedi fighter from Star Wars. And Demaris, a 17-year-old apprentice hooker, craves security for herself and her baby. Lenny, a hoodlum, goes for an unlikely job interview as an on-site field marketeer which actually involves handing out flyers. Skank is obliged to supply sexual favors to feed his own desolate habit.

- Holy Roller
- Lenny
- Greer
- Mrs. Reyes
- Demaris
- Daisy
- Charlie
- Skank
- Chickie
- Sammy
- Jake

== Productions ==
=== Off-Off-Broadway, 1999 ===
The play premiered Off-Off-Broadway at Center Stage in a LAByrinth Theatre Company production on June 23, 1999 in previews, July 8 officially and closed on July 23, 1999.

Directed by Philip Seymour Hoffman, the cast featured Russell G. Jones as Greer, Trevor Long as Skank, David Zayas as Lenny, Liza Zayas as Daisy, Ana Ortiz as Demaris, Tiprin Mandalay as Chicky, Sal Inzerillo as Charlie, Richard Petrocelli as Jake, Mark Hammer as Sammy, and Begonya Plaza as Mrs. Reyes. As The New York Times described it, "Zoot-suited craps players have been replaced by junkies in dirty T-shirts who will do anything for drug money, and the Salvation Army evangelists are now religious nuts who carve up the prostitutes rather than preach to them."

=== London, 2003 ===
The play was performed at the Hampstead Theatre in London from 24 April to 17 May 2003. Directed by Robert Delamere, the cast featured Danny Cerqueira, Tom Hardy (Skank), Ashley Davies, Sam Douglas, Evelyn Duah, David Hinton, Gerry Lepkowski (Charlie), Colin McFarlane, Celia Meiras, Garfield Morgan, Deborah Weston, and Benedict Wong. Hardy received the Evening Standard Theatre Award for Outstanding Newcomer.

In its review, the London Evening Standard said, "Chickie’s boyfriend, Skank, played by Tom Hardy in a remarkable stage debut, is all meaningless hand gestures and contorted body language, as he ineffectually tries to drive a hard sexual bargain with an exploitative businessmen. The scene powerfully conveys Guirgis’s outrage at the way the poor lose out." Variety' found that, "The play underscores the tragic truth that the human psyche yearns for stability and will eventually accept any remnant of it that can be found."

=== California, 2007 ===
Presented at the Elephant Theatre Company in Hollywood, California from January 26, 2007 - April 21, 2007. Directed by Founding Artistic Director, David Fofi, featuring Jade Dornfeld, Carolina Espiro, Dan Gilvary, Torrance Jordan, Patricia Rae, Charlie Romanelli, George Russo, Steven Schub, Bernadette Speakes, Tim Starks, Kenny Suarez, and Jason Warren. The production garnered 4 LA Drama Critic's Circle Awards: Production, Writing, Scenic Design and Lighting Design.

Julio Martinez of Variety said the play "takes a jaundiced look at Mayor Rudy Giuliani's 1990s New York City beautification project and its effect on a group of Hell's Kitchen locals. Helmer David Fofi advances Guirgis' agenda thanks to a perfectly cast 12-member ensemble embodying the woebegone urbanites whose shaky sense of stability has been totally disrupted." Calling David Fofi "one of L.A.'s best directors", Charlotte Stoudt of the Los Angeles Times said he "keeps his exceptional cast grounded in each moment; their comedy and heartbreak feels equally earned, and the artistic discipline on view here finds strong chemistry with the play's outsized rhythms...Arabia carries an undeniably cumulative power."

Les Spindle of Backstage West found the production "magnificently acted and impeccably mounted", and that "raucous hilarity segues to heartbreak and fear in a heartbeat", and praised its "seamless ensemble." Steven Mikulan of L.A. Weekly said the ensemble's "standouts include Tim Starks as a self-motivated wheeler-dealer named Greer, and George Russo as the bar’s misanthropic owner, Jake. The action unfolds on Joel Daavid’s wonderfully detailed bar set that Daavid also lights with feeble, subterranean illumination."

=== Cleveland, 2012 ===
It was produced at Cleveland Play House in Cleveland, Ohio, from February 1–11, 2012, by the Graduate Ensemble of 2014.

=== Dublin, 2015 ===
The play was produced at the Players Theatre in Dublin in 2015. The production was directed by Liam Hallahan.
