= Corey Page =

Australian film and television actor (born 1971)

- Born: 27 March 1971 (age 55); Broken Hill, New South Wales, Australia
- Occupation: Actor
- Years active: 1994–present

Corey Page (born 27 March 1971) is an Australian film and television actor. He had a leading role in the television series Heartbreak High in Australia. Additionally, he was a series regular in the US television series The City from 1995–96.

Page also co-starred in the MTV/Paramount feature film, Dead Man on Campus in 1998, and supporting role in the independent film The Road Home.

Most recently, Page served as on-set drama coach for the independent Australian film Newcastle, directed by US writer/director, Dan Castle and as Matthew Webster in the 2011 Australian film Wrath.

== Filmography ==
=== Films ===
| Year | Title | Role | Type |
|---|---|---|---|
| 1998 | Dead Man on Campus | Matthew ‘Matt‘ Noonan | Feature film |
| 1999 | Mascara | Andrew | Feature film |
| 1999 | Iggy Vile M.D. | Iggy | TV movie |
| 1999 | Royal Standard | Treymore | TV movie |
| 2001 | Devils Prey | Treymore | |
| 2003 | The Road Home | Vince Taylor | Feature film |
| 2004 | Hooked | Thomas | Short film |
| 2011 | Wrath | Matthew Webster | Feature film |
| 2016 | Hurricane | Oslo Alduars | Short film |
| 2017 | A Dusty Town | Sports Reporter | Feature film |
| 2020 | A Shot in the Dark | Roy | Short film |
| 2021 | The Things We Do When We’re Alone | Paul | Short film |
| TBA | Can’t Be Undone | Tyler | Feature film (completed) |
| TBA | Mind of a Coyote | Evan | Short film (in post-production) |

=== Television ===
| Year | Title | Role | Type |
|---|---|---|---|
| 1994-95 | Heartbreak High | Steve Wiley | TV series, 65 episodes |
| 1995 | Loving | Richard Wilkins | TV series, 36 episodes |
| 1995-97 | The City | Richard Wilkins | TV series, 165 episodes |
| 1999 | Pacific Blue | | TV series, 2 episodes |
| 2000 | Providence | Matt | TV series, 1 episode |
| 2003 | McLeod's Daughters | Damien Cozek | TV series, 2 episodes |
| 2003 | White Collar Blue | Nick Karados | TV series, 1 episode |
| 2006 | Home and Away | Drew | TV series, 1 episode |
| 2010 | Cops LAC | Richard | TV series, 1 episode |
| 2017 | Lurk | Kel Witmore | TV series |
| 2017 | Sorry Not Sorry | Police Officer | TV series |
| 2017 | You Can Do Better | | TV series, 1 episode |
| 2017-19 | Triads | Carl | TV series, 6 episodes |
| 2020 | The Circuit | Angus P | TV series, 1 episode |
