= House of Cards (1993 film) =

1993 film by Michael Lessac

- Theatrical release poster
- Directed by: Michael Lessac
- Written by: Michael Lessac; Robert Jay Litz (story)
- Produced by: Lianne Halfon; Wolfgang Glattes; Dale Pollock
- Starring: Kathleen Turner; Tommy Lee Jones
- Cinematography: Victor Hammer
- Edited by: Walter Murch
- Music by: James Horner
- Production companies: A&M Films; Penta Pictures
- Distributed by: Miramax Films
- Release dates: January 30, 1993 (Sundance); June 25, 1993 (United States)
- Running time: 109 minutes
- Country: United States
- Language: English
- Budget: $10.5 million
- Box office: $322,871

House of Cards is a 1993 American drama film co-written and directed by Michael Lessac and starring Kathleen Turner and Tommy Lee Jones. It follows the struggle of a mother to reconnect with her daughter who has been traumatized by the death of her father. The film was completed in 1991 by A&M Films, but was delayed for release. It finally premiered at the 1993 Sundance Film Festival, where it was acquired by Miramax Films for theatrical distribution that June.

This would be the last film Miramax released as an independent company before being purchased by The Walt Disney Company just five days after this film's wide release in the United States. Disney would distribute Miramax's films from Benefit of the Doubt on July 16, 1993 to The Switch on August 20, 2010, before selling Miramax to Filmyard Holdings on December 3, 2010.

== Plot ==
Following the death of her archeologist husband, Ruth Matthews moves her family back to their house in a quiet suburb, hoping to put the past behind them. While her son Michael is able to adapt, her young daughter Sally, is apparently traumatized by the experience and starts displaying unusual behavior, including building an elaborate tower from playing cards and photographs. Ruth is later court mandated to see Jake Beerlander, an expert in child autism, to help Sally.

== Cast ==
- Kathleen Turner as Ruth Matthews
- Tommy Lee Jones as Jake Beerlander
- Asha Menina as Sally Matthews
- Shiloh Strong as Michael Matthews
- Esther Rolle as Adelle
- Park Overall as Lillian Huber
- Michael Horse as Stoker
- Jacqueline Cassell as Gloria Miller

== Production ==
Michael Lessac originally developed the script as a father-daughter drama, but rewrote it as a mother-daughter story for his friend Kathleen Turner.

Filming began on April 15, 1991 in North Carolina. Once filming concluded in North Carolina, the production moved to Villahermosa, Mexico, and the Mayan ruins of Comalcalco.

== Reception ==
=== Release ===
Twentieth Century Fox and Penta Pictures were scheduled to release the film in March 1992, but after a year-long delay, the film premiered without a distributor as the closing night film of the 1993 Sundance Film Festival on January 30, 1993. Miramax acquired distribution rights at Sundance and gave the film a limited release on June 25, 1993. The film also screened at the Houston International Film Festival and the LA Film Festival.

=== Critical response ===
Robert Faires of The Austin Chronicle gave a positive review, writing "Lessac and his company have created and sustained such honest, yearning individuals that when the story reaches its wholly predictable and sentimental finale, its people are not diminished at all. Their pain and love are no less real and they no less worthy of our affection."

Critic Roger Ebert awarded the film one out of four stars, describing it as "all but inexplicable. It is not interesting, intelligent, plausible, thought-provoking, entertaining or necessary. The synopsis is so absurd it would also seem to be unproduceable." He concluded his review with, "If you want to see acting in a void, watch Tommy Lee Jones' scenes very closely. Here is one of the most interesting actors around. He has been given a ridiculous character, whose dramatic connection to the rest of the film is a mystery. Yet he exudes intensity and concern, and is somehow able to convince us something is happening with his character, even when, in retrospect, it is clear Jones must have been as puzzled as the rest of us."
