= The Last Days of Judas Iscariot =

Play written by Stephen Adly Guirgis

- Original West End poster
- Original language: English
- Written by: Stephen Adly Guirgis
- Characters: Judas Iscariot; Satan; Fabiana Aziza Cunningham; El-Fayoumy; Judge Frank Littlefield; Saint Monica; Pontius Pilate; Caiaphas; Simon the Zealot; Mother Teresa; Henrietta Iscariot; Jesus; Butch Honeywell; Matthias of Galilee; Sigmund Freud; Bailiff; Loretta
- Subject: In modern times, Judas Iscariot is on appeal in Purgatory.
- Genre: Comedy, drama
- Setting: Purgatory and Earth

Premiere
- Date: March 2, 2005
- Place: The Public Theater; New York City

The Last Days of Judas Iscariot is a play by American playwright Stephen Adly Guirgis first staged Off-Broadway at The Public Theater on March 2, 2005, directed by Philip Seymour Hoffman.

== Plot summary ==
The Last Days of Judas Iscariot tells the story of a court case over the ultimate fate of Judas Iscariot. The play uses flashbacks to an imagined childhood and lawyers who call for the testimonies of such witnesses as Mother Teresa, Caiaphas, Saint Monica, Sigmund Freud, and Satan.

== Productions ==
=== Off-Broadway ===
The original production premiered Off-Broadway in a Labyrinth Theatre Company production at the Public Theatre on March 2, 2005, and closed on April 3, 2005. Directed by Philip Seymour Hoffman, the cast included Eric Bogosian (Satan), Liza Colón-Zayas (Gloria/Mother Teresa/Ensemble), Jeffrey DeMunn (Judge Littlefield/Caiaphas the Elder/St. Matthew), Yetta Gottesman (Loretta/Mary Magdalene/Ensemble), Craig muMs Grant (Matthias of Galilee/Delayne/St. Peter/Soldier 2/Ensemble), Stephen McKinley Henderson (Pontius Pilate/Uncle Pino), Salvatore Inzerillo (Bailiff/Simon the Zealot/Ensemble), Adrian Martinez (Boaz the Assyrian Thief/Sigmund Freud/St. Thomas/Soldier 1), John Ortiz (Jesus of Nazareth), Sam Rockwell (Judas Iscariot), Elizabeth Rodriguez (Saint Monica/Soldier 3/Ensemble), Deborah Rush (Henrietta Iscariot/Sister Glenna/Ensemble), Kohl Sudduth (Butch Honeywell, Ensemble), Callie Thorne (Fabiana Aziza Cunningham), and Yul Vázquez (Yusef El-Fayoumy). It was designed by Andromache Chalfant. James Martin served as a theological adviser.

=== London ===
The original London/European Premiere was at the Almeida Theatre, and was directed by Rupert Goold, and it ran from 28 March to 10 May 2008. The cast included (in order of appearance) Amanda Boxer (Henrietta Iscariot), Doña Croll (Gloria/Mother Teresa), Corey Johnson (Judge/Saint Peter), John Macmillan (Bailiff/Simon the Zealot), Susan Lynch (Fabiana Aziza Cunningham), Mark Lockyer (Yusef El-Fayoumy), Jessika Williams (St Monica), Poppy Miller (Loretta/Sister Glenna/Mary Magdalene), Ron Cephas Jones (Uncle Pino/Pontius Pilate), Shane Attwooll (Butch Honeywell), Joseph Mawle (Judas Iscariot), Josh Cohen (Matthias of Galilee/Freud/St Thomas), Gawn Grainger (St Matthew/Caiaphas the Elder), Douglas Henshall (Satan) and Edward Hogg (Jesus of Nazareth). It was designed by Anthony Ward.

Another production had a short run at the Barbican Centre's Milton Court Theatre in October 2018, directed by Wyn Jones. The cast included (in order of appearance) Kristina Tonteri-Young (Henrietta Iscariot), Matthew Nikitow (Judas Iscariot), Laurel Waghorn (Jesus), Uri Levy (Angel Gloria / Caiaphas), Jordan Angell (Judge Littlefield), Dan Hazel (Butch Honeywell). The designer was Libby Watson, with Lewis Hannaby as lighting designer and Ben Hagle as sound designer.

== Reception ==
The Last Days of Judas Iscariot was received fairly positively. Curtain Up gave it a positive review, specially mentioning Eric Bogosian's portrayal of Satan. NY Mag however said that for $50 a ticket, "LAB might eventually want to put forth a finished product."

The original West End production was met with almost unanimously positive reviews, The Hollywood Reporter calling it "funny, profound and wildly entertaining", praising "sensational performances". Charles Spencer of The Daily Telegraph starting his review with "it's hard to know where to begin with this astonishing play that knocked me for six at the Almeida", and finishing with "Guirgis and Goold have a sensational hit on their hands." Times Online however gave it 3 stars out of 5, saying "too much New York, maybe. One doesn’t want an earnestly pious, reverential play. But do we want one which tries to make big, big issues palatable by coating them not with sugar but, at times, with bubblegum?"
