= Elephant Theatre Company =

Non-profit theatre company based in Hollywood

Coordinates: 34°5′26″N 118°19′39.2″W

The former Elephant Theatre Company stages located at 6322 Santa Monica Blvd.

The Elephant Theatre Company was a non-profit theatre company based in Hollywood, California. The company "built a reputation for championing new American plays." It ceased operation in September 2015.

== History ==
The Elephant Theatre Company was created in 1995 by David Fofi and Lindsay Allbaugh, along with classmates from the California State University, Long Beach Theatre Arts program, getting their start in a space at the Angel City Brewery artist complex. The space doubled as both a studio theater and a loft apartment. The facility was renovated, creating a small theatre and living quarters, and was given the name of "Elephant Off Main".

In the summer of 1997, the small 45-seat theater could no longer accommodate the production needs or the increasing audience attendance. The Company then moved to Hollywood (and dropped the “Off Main”). David Fofi along with founding member Don Cesario continued to produce Elephant productions in various Hollywood venues.

During their 1998/1999 season, the company moved to 6322 Santa Monica Boulevard, in Los Angeles' Theatre Row District.

In 2015, the theatre building was sold by its landlord to a neighboring school. The last produced show ("The Great Divide" by Lyle Kessler) closed on August 23, 2015. The Elephant Theatre was left without a permanent space.

== Chronology of Plays ==
Summer 2015:
'The Great Divide Written by: Lyle Kessler Directed by: David Fofi Produced by: Bren Coombs and Shannon McManus

Spring 2015:
7 Redneck Cheerleaders Written by: Louis Douglas Jacobs Directed by: David Fofi Produced by: Bren Coombs

Winter 2014:
Hell Cab Written by: Will Kern Directed by: David Fofi

Fall 2014:

Scene Workshop Showcase of various company members

Fall 2014:

Elephant Short Play Fest Short plays written and directed by various company members

Summer 2014: Le Butte 1 One acts written and directed by various company members

Summer 2014:
Unorganized Crime written by: Kenny D'Aquila Directed by: David Fofi

Spring 2014:
Derby Day written by: Samuel Brett Williams Directed by: David Fofi

Winter 2014:
Twilight of Schlomo written by: Timothy McNeil Directed by: David Fofi

Summer 2013:
Revelation written by: Samueal Brett Williams Directed by: David Fofi

Spring 2013:
The North Plan written by: Jason Wells Directed by: David Fofi

2012:
7 Redneck Cheerleaders written by: Louis Douglas Jacobs Original Staging by: Amy French
Re-staged by: David Fofi & Louis Jacobs

2012:
Collision written by: Lyle Kessler Directed by: David Fofi

June 2011:
Lovesick written by: Kristina Poe Directed by: David Fofi

June 2011:
100 Saints You Should Know written by: Kate Fodor Directed by: Lindsay Allbaugh

February–March 2011:
The 10th Anniversary of Love Bites: 10 Years Together & Still No Ring Annual shorts written and directed by various company members

August–September 2010:
Parasite Drag written by: Mark Roberts
Directed by: David Fofi

May–June 2010:
Supernova written by: Tim McNeil
Directed by: Lindsay Allbaugh

February–March 2010:
Love Bites Vol. 9 Annual shorts written and directed by various company members

August 2009-September 2009:
Block Nine written by: Tom Stanczk
Directed by: Emilie Beck & Pete Uribe

May 2009-June 2009:
The Idea Man written by: Kevin King
Directed by: David Fofi

February–March 2009:
Love Bites Vol. 8.0 Annual shorts written and directed by various company members

2008:
7 Redneck Cheerleaders written by: Louis Douglas Jacobs Directed by: Amy French

July 2008-October 2008:
Asleep on a Bicycle written by: Tony Foster
Directed by: David Fofi

May 2008-June 2008:
Tooth and Nail written by: Gena Acosta
Directed by: Lindsay Allbaugh

February–March 2008:
Love Bites VI & VII Annual shorts written and directed by various company members

November 2007-February 2008:
Anything written by: Tim McNeil
Directed by: David Fofi

August 2007:
One Fell Swoop written by: Robert J. Litz
Directed by: Christopher Game

March–April 2007:
Love Bites Vol. V Annual shorts written and directed by various company members

January–April 2007:
In Arabia We’d All Be Kings Written by: Stephen Adly Guirgis
Directed by: David Fofi

December 2006:
365 Days/Plays (week 4: Los Angeles)
Written by: Suzan-Lori Parks
Directed by: Lindsay Allbaugh, David Fofi, and Christopher Game

August–October 2006:
Seven Redneck Cheerleaders Written by: Louis Jacobs
Original Staging by: Amy French
Re-staged by: David Fofi & Louis Jacobs

March 2006:
Love Bites
Annual shorts written and directed by various company members

November 2005-January 2006:
Los Muertos Written by: Tim McNeil
Directed by: David Fofi

August 2005:
Seven Redneck Cheerleaders
Written by: Louis Jacobs
Directed by: Amy French

May 2005:
Never Tell
Written by: James Christy
Directed by: Lindsay Allbaugh

December 2004:
Underwear For Christmas
Written by: Tony Foster
Directed by: Daniel McCoy

October 2004:
Love Bites Harder
Annual shorts written and directed by various company members

June 2004:
One World
Written by Robert J. Litz
Directed by David Fofi

April 2004:
21 Stories
Written by: G.W. Stevens
Directed by: Yuval Hadid

October 3 One Act Festival
All Men are Whores, and Bobby Gould in Hell written by David Mamet
Not Enough Rope, and Hotline written by Elaine May
Desire, Desire, Desire, ‘Dentiy Crisis and 1-900-Desperate by Christopher Durang

August 2003:
Robbers
Written by Lyle Kessler
Directed by David Fofi
Workshop Production with Lyle Kessler, not submitted for review

April 2003:
Some Strings Attached
Written by: Amy French and Alexandra Hoover
Directed by: Gina Soto

March 2003:
King of Clubs
Written and Directed by: David Fofi

October 2002:
Zzyxx
Written by: Don Cesario
Directed by: Kimberly Brooks

August 2002:
Serenading Louie
Written by: Lanford Wilson
Directed by: Christopher Game and Gina Soto

April 2002:
Love Bites
Series of one acts written and directed by various company members

December 2001:
Red Cross and 4H-Club
Written by: Sam Shepard
Directed by: Chris Game & Dave Fofi

November 2001:
Greystone
Written by: Tony Foster
Directed by: Kristin Hanggi

June 2001:
Dearboy's War
Written by: Mike Ambrose
Directed by: Danny LaClair

December 2000:
Underwear for Christmas
Written and Directed by: Tony Foster

October 2000:
The Insanity of Mary Girard
Written by: Lanie Robertson
Directed by: Pat McLoy and David Brown

April 2000:
Elephant Shorts, a Collection of Vignettes
Written by: Tony Foster
Directed by: E.O.M. Directors

November 1999:
Search & Destroy
Written by: Howard Korder
Directed by: David Fofi & Anthony Roman

May 1999:
The Actors Nightmare
Written by: Christopher Durang
Directed by: Christopher Game

Gecko Chestnut Genius
Written by: Jimmie D. Hudson III
Directed by: Don Cesario

April 1999:
Line
Written by Israel Horowitz
Directed by: Gary Blumsack
Shooting Gallery
Written by Israel Horowitz
Directed by: Andrea C. Robbins
Stage Directions
Written by Israel Horowitz
Directed by: Pat McLoy

March 1999:
Indian Summer of Our Despondency
Written by: Kelly Wand
Directed by: David Fofi

August 1998:
Halfway There
Written by: Michael Vaez
Directed by: Christopher Game
at the Hollywood Court Theater, Hollywood

July 1997:
Warmth and Doubt
Written by: David Fofi
Directed by: David Fofi & Andrea Robins
The Princess and the Peon
Written by: Jimmie D. Hudson, Directed by: Christopher Game
Candlefish Theatre, Los Angeles

February 1997:
The Love of Nechron
Written and Directed by: Pat McLoy
Elephant Off Main Theatre, Los Angeles

November 1996:
Criminal
Written by: David Canales
Directed by: Jeff Walsh

September 1996:
Holding Cell
Written by: Mike Vaez
Directed By: Joe Matthews

May 1996:
Solitary Ping Pong
Written by: Jimmie D. Hudson
Directed by: Lori Lee Bush
My Only Hopeless
Written by: Jackie Apodaca
Directed by: Christopher Game

March 1996:
King Of Clubs
Written and Directed by: Dave Fofi
Adam and Rhonda
Written by: Matthew Jones

Nov 1995:
The Galaxy Lily
Written and Directed by: Don Cesario

July 1995:
Sam Shepard Tribute
Red Cross
Directed by: Christopher Game
4-H Club
Directed by David Fofi
Fourteen Hundred Thousand
Directed by: Kimberly Brooks
