= Stephen Adly Guirgis =

American dramatist (born 1965)

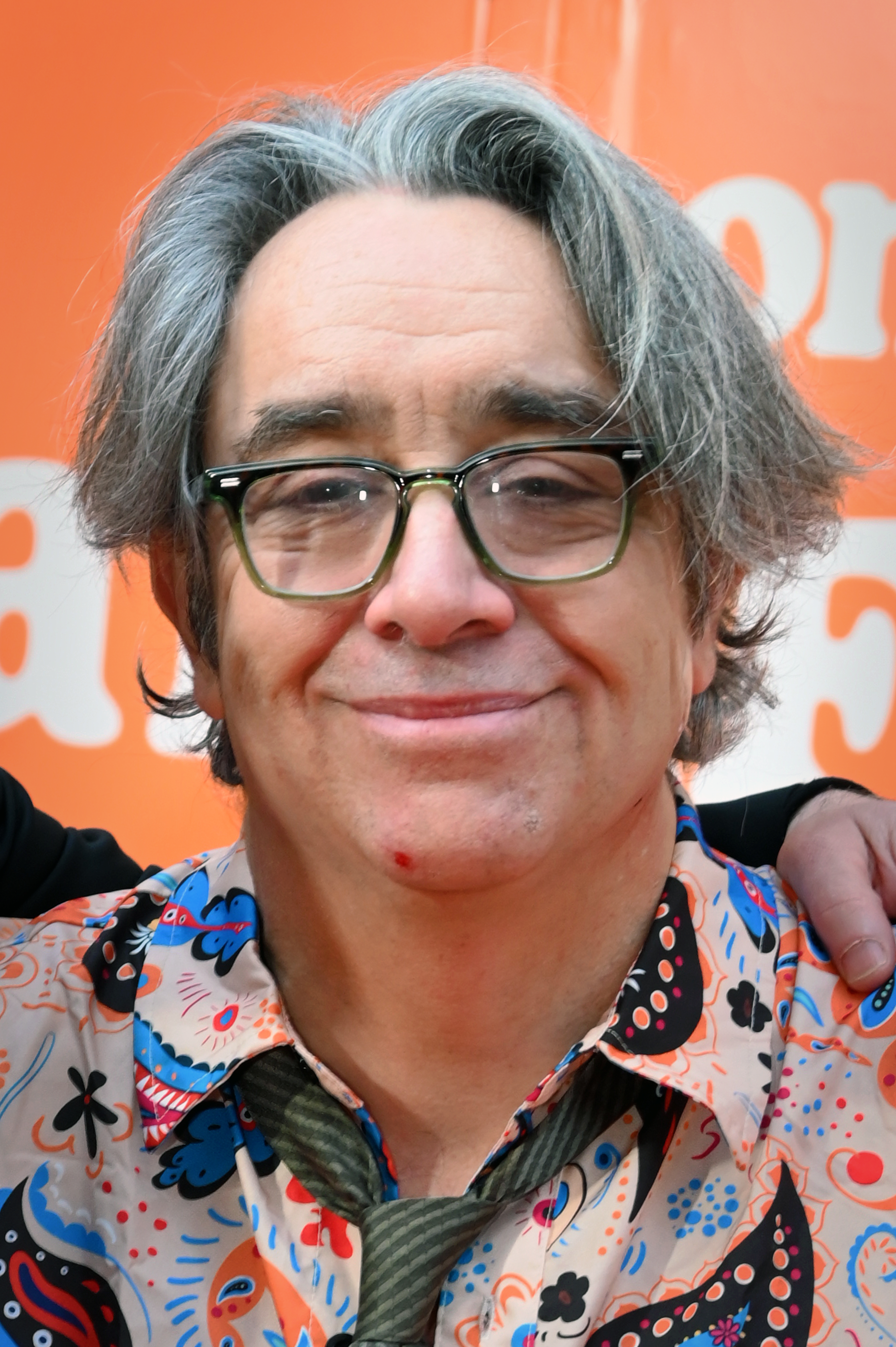
- Guirgis in 2026
- Born: 1965 (age 60–61); Kearny, New Jersey, U.S.
- Education: University at Albany, SUNY (BA)
- Occupations: Playwright, screenwriter, director, actor
- Notable work: Between Riverside and Crazy
- Awards: Pulitzer Prize for Drama (2015)

Stephen Adly Guirgis (born 1965) is an American playwright, screenwriter, director, and actor. He is a member and a former co-artistic director of New York City's LAByrinth Theater Company. His plays have been produced both Off-Broadway and on Broadway, as well as in the UK. His play Between Riverside and Crazy won the 2015 Pulitzer Prize for Drama.

== Life and career ==
=== Early years and education ===
Born in 1965 in Kearny, New Jersey, Guirgis is the son of an Egyptian father and an Irish American mother. He was raised on New York City's Upper West Side. He attended school in nearby Harlem and graduated from the University at Albany, SUNY in 1992. He studied theatre at HB Studio.

=== Writing ===
Guirgis' play In Arabia We'd All Be Kings ran Off-Broadway in 1999. A production at the Elephant Theatre Company in Hollywood, California in 2007 received four LA Drama Critic's Circle Awards: Production, Writing, Scenic Design and Lighting Design.

Jesus Hopped the 'A' Train premiered Off-Broadway in a production by LAByrinth Theater Company in 2000. It was produced in London at the Donmar Warehouse in 2002, and was nominated for the Olivier Award, Best New Play for 2003, as well as the Edinburgh Festival Fringe First Award.

His play Our Lady of 121st Street ran originally in an Off-Broadway production by the LAByrinth Theater at Center Stage/NY and then transferred to the Union Square Theatre from March 6, 2003, to July 27, 2003. The play was directed by Philip Seymour Hoffman. The play received Lucille Lortel, Drama Desk, and Outer Critics Circle Award nominations for Best Play.

His play The Last Days of Judas Iscariot was produced Off-Broadway by LAByrinth at The Public Theater in 2005 and was directed by Philip Seymour Hoffman, and was named one of the year's "10 best" plays by Time magazine and Entertainment Weekly. The play completed a critically acclaimed run in London at the Almeida Theater on May 10, 2008.

His one-act play, Dominica The Fat Ugly Ho, was directed by Adam Rapp as part of the 2006 E.S.T. Marathon.

The Little Flower of East Orange, starring Ellen Burstyn and directed by Philip Seymour Hoffman, was produced Off-Broadway by the LAByrinth Theater Company at The Public Theater, opening on April 6, 2008, and closing on May 4, 2008. The play was developed at the Manhattan Theatre Club's "6 @ 7" series.

His play The Motherfucker With the Hat was nominated for seven Tony Awards and premiered on Broadway in 2011 and featured Bobby Cannavale, Chris Rock, Elizabeth Rodriguez, Annabella Sciorra and Yul Vazquez. It was also performed in San Francisco at San Francisco Playhouse in January 2013 where it received positive reviews.

Guirgis' play Between Riverside and Crazy premiered Off-Broadway at the Atlantic Theater Company in July 2014 and closed on August 23, 2014. It then was produced by Second Stage Theatre, opening in previews on January 16, 2015, officially on February 11, 2015. Directed by Austin Pendleton, the play featured Stephen McKinley Henderson. The play received a nomination for the 2015 Drama League Award, Outstanding Production of a Broadway or Off-Broadway Play. The play won the 2015 Outer Critics Circle Award, Outstanding New Off-Broadway Play, the 2015 New York Drama Critics Circle Award for Best Play, and the 2015 Lucille Lortel Award for Outstanding Play. Artists Repertory Theatre, located in Portland, Oregon, staged Between Riverside and Crazy from March 4 to April 1, 2018. The show had its Broadway debut with previews beginning December 1, 2022, and opening on December 19, 2022.

In 2017 Guirgis was embroiled in a publicized debate with a small theater in San Francisco which had produced an edited version of The Last Days of Judas Iscariot. While Guirgis was displeased to learn that his play had been edited without his permission, in violation of the production's licensing contract, he was also sympathetic to the production's cast and crew and did not want to shut down the production as Dramatists Play Service recommended. He requested that the theater place inserts in the show programs explaining that the show was edited without his permission and against his wishes. When Guirgis saw a copy of the program insert he requested, he deemed the insert unsuitable and had the production shut down.

His award-winning play Halfway Bitches Go Straight to Heaven, directed by John Ortiz in 2019 in a LAByrinth Theater/Atlantic Theater co-production, features a cast of 18 plus a goat, and garnered Obie Awards for its two stars, Liza Colón-Zayas and Elizabeth Rodriguez.

His adaptation of the film Dog Day Afternoon premiered on Broadway on March 10, 2026. The show had a 16 week run at the August Wilson Theatre, with an official opening date of March 30, 2026.

Television writing credits include NYPD Blue, David Milch's short-lived CBS drama Big Apple, and Shane Salerno's short-lived NBC series UC: Undercover. Guirgis collaborated with Academy Award nominated director Baz Luhrmann on The Get Down, a Netflix series about the birth of hip-hop in the 1970s.

=== Directing ===
He developed and directed Liza Colón-Zayas' play Sistah Supreme for Danny Hoch's Hip Hop Theater Festival in 2000, Marco Greco's award-winning Behind the Counter with Mussolini at the York Theatre (1998 in New York) and Los Angeles (1999 and 2002), and directed Melanie Maras' Kiss Me on the Mouth for InViolet Rep in 2009.

=== Acting ===
He appeared in Brett C. Leonard's stage play Guinea Pig Solo, produced by LAByrinth at The Public Theater in 2004. He has had supporting roles in films such as Todd Solondz's Palindromes (2004), Brett C. Leonard's Jailbait (2004), and Kenneth Lonergan's Margaret (2011). Other credits include the 1997 Law & Order episode "Terminal" and films such as Meet Joe Black (1998), Blackbird (2007), Trainwreck: My Life as an Idiot (2007), Noise (2007), Synecdoche, New York (2008), and Philip Seymour Hoffman's directorial debut Jack Goes Boating (2010). Guirgis was a series regular portraying Frank Mariani on HBO's Winning Time: The Rise of the Lakers Dynasty.

=== Personal life ===
Guirgis has used improvisational theater to "teach HIV/AIDS prevention, conflict resolution, and leadership" in prisons, schools, shelters, and hospitals. Guirgis was close professional and personal friends with late actor Philip Seymour Hoffman, with whom he was a frequent collaborator.

== Accolades and honors ==
Guirgis was awarded a 2006 PEN/Laura Pels Theater Award for a playwright in mid-career, a 2006 Whiting Award, and a 2004 TCG fellowship. He attended the 2006 Sundance Screenwriter's Lab, and was named one of 2004's 25 New Faces of Independent Film by Filmmaker Magazine.

In 2014, Guirgis was awarded the Steinberg Distinguished Playwright Award.

Guirgis is the recipient of new play commissions from Manhattan Theatre Club, Center Theater Group, and South Coast Repertory. He is a member of New Dramatists, MCC's Playwright's Coalition, New River Dramatists, Primary Stages, and the Actors Studio Playwright/Directors Unit.

He received the 2013 Windham–Campbell Literature Prize.

He received the 2015 Pulitzer Prize for Drama for Between Riverside and Crazy.

Our Lady of 121st Street received a Lucille Lortel Award nomination, Outstanding Play, Outstanding Director (Hoffman); 2003 Outer Critics Circle Award nomination, John Glassner Award; Drama Desk Award nomination, Director (Hoffman) and Outstanding Play.

He received a Literature Award from the American Academy of Arts and Letters in May 2016.

== Plays ==
- Race, Religion and Politics (1997)
- Den of Thieves (1997)
- In Arabia We'd All Be Kings (1999)
- Jesus Hopped the 'A' Train (2000)
- Our Lady of 121st Street (2003)
- The Last Days of Judas Iscariot (2005)
- Dominica the Fat Ugly Ho (2006)
- The Little Flower of East Orange (2008)
- The Motherfucker with the Hat (2011)
- Between Riverside and Crazy (2014) (winner of the 2015 Pulitzer Prize for Drama)
- Halfway Bitches Go Straight to Heaven (2019)
- Dog Day Afternoon (2026)

== Filmography ==
=== Film ===
Year	Title	Role	Notes
1998	Meet Joe Black	Hospital Receptionist	
2004	Jailbait	Jake	
2004	Palindromes	Joe / Earl / Bob	
2007	Blackbird	Mercato	
2007	Trainwreck: My Life as an Idiot	Al	
2007	Noise	Allen J. Corpitanni	
2008	Synecdoche, New York	Davis	
2010	Jack Goes Boating	MTA Worker	
2011	Margaret	Mitchell	
2014	Birdman	Good Neighbor	
2018	Vice	George Tenet	
2019	Motherless Brooklyn	Detective	
2022	Funny Pages	Mr. Katano	
2026	The Man I Love	Larry	
2026	Lucy Schulman	TBA	

=== Television ===
Year	Title	Role	Notes
1997	Law & Order	Ibrahim	Episode: "Terminal"
2019–2022	Russian Doll	Peter	2 episodes
2022	New Amsterdam	Chaplain Alpert	Episode: "...Unto the Breach"
2022–2023	Winning Time: The Rise of the Lakers Dynasty	Frank Mariani	17 episodes
