= Lightning Entertainment =

Lightning Entertainment is an American film distributor, sales agent, and production company based in Santa Monica, California. It was founded in 2002 by Richard Guardian, Rich Goldberg, and Marc Greenberg, focusing on sales and distribution of independent films. It began offering film production services in 2012, which it stated were designed to help domestic films better target international markets.

== See also ==
- Non-Transferable, distributed by Lightning Entertainment.
