= Stef Dawson =

Australian actress

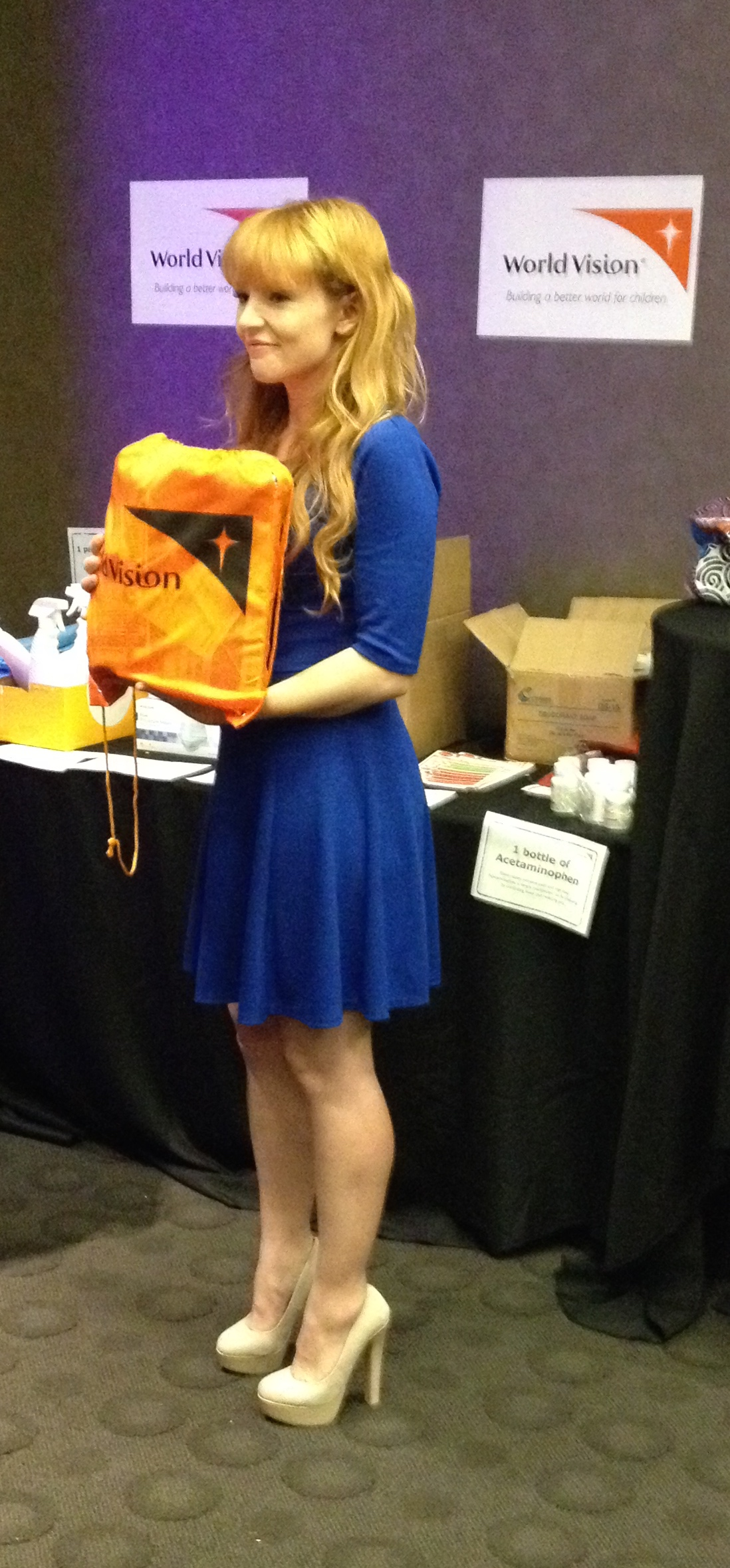
- Stef Dawson delivering a PSA for World Vision (Tara Bitran/Neon Tommy)
- Born: Canberra, Australia
- Education: Canberra Girls' Grammar School; Radford College, Screenwise Film & TV School; University of Wollongong
- Occupation: Actress
- Years active: 2006–present
- Notable work: The Hunger Games: Catching Fire; The Hunger Games: Mockingjay – Part 1 The Hunger Games: Mockingjay – Part 2 The Lennon Report; Creedmoria; The Paper Store; Wrath

Stef Dawson is an Australian actress. She portrayed Annie Cresta in The Hunger Games: Mockingjay – Part 1 and Part 2. She also made a cameo appearance in The Hunger Games: Catching Fire.

== Personal life ==
Dawson was born in Canberra, Australian Capital Territory and attended the Canberra Girls' Grammar School, Radford College, and Screenwise Film & TV School. She also studied theatre and opera at the University of Wollongong.

== Career ==
Dawson performed in many plays at Short and Sweet in Sydney from 2007 to 2009. She made her first short film role as the lead in Chocolates. Later, she landed the lead role as the title character in the short film Ophelia and also, received a role in The Consulate as Sarah Rael. She landed a role in All Saints as Tully McIntyre; where she made her television debut in the episode, "The Blink of an Eye". Dawson made another television appearance in Out of Blue as a guest role, and in Swift and Shift Couriers as Kylie Brown in the episode "The Polar Bear Suit". Dawson then landed her first lead in an Australian feature film playing Leah Thompson, in Wrath. Dawson made a film appearance in Foxfur as Pearlwing.

Dawson portrayed Annie Cresta in The Hunger Games: Mockingjay – Part 1 and The Hunger Games: Mockingjay – Part 2. She also made a brief appearance in The Hunger Games: Catching Fire. Dawson next appeared in the microbudget film Creedmoria, which premiered at the 2016 Cinequest Film Festival in San Jose, California.

== Filmography ==
=== Film ===
Year	Title	Role	Notes
2005	Gestation	Sonora	Lead role, short
2006	Chocolates	The Girl in The Glass Case	Lead role, short
2007	Ophelia	Ophelia	Lead role, short
2007	The Consulate	Sarah Rael	Lead role, short
2009	The Mad Chase: Aka the Chase	Lead role, short	
2009	The Rose	Miss Winthorpe	Short
2011	Wrath	Leah Thompson	Lead role Feature film
2012	Sunday Billy Sunday: A Memoir	Lead role	Short
2012	Foxfur	Pearlwing	Feature film
2013	Shadow of the Monarch	Agent Lace	Feature film
2013	The Beginning	Sarah	Short
2013	6 Years, 4 Months & 23 Days	Lucy Cross	Short
2013	The Hunger Games: Catching Fire	Annie Cresta	Cameo appearance
2014	The Hunger Games: Mockingjay – Part 1	Annie Cresta	
2014	Rage of Innocence	Raven Sutton	Lead role Feature film
2014	Creedmoria	Candy Cahill	Lead role Feature film
2015	The Hunger Games: Mockingjay – Part 2	Annie Cresta	
2016	The Paper Store	Annalee Monegan	
2017	Painted Woman	Julie Richards	Lead role Feature film
2016	The Lennon Report	Barbara Kammerer	
2018	Guardians of the Tomb	Milly Piper	
2019	The Dustwalker	Samantha Sharp	

=== Television ===
Year	Title	Role	Notes
2007	All Saints	Tully McIntyre	1 episode: "The Blink of an Eye"
2008	Out of the Blue	Sales Person	1 episode: minor Role
2008	Swift and Shift Couriers	Kylie Brown	1 episode: "The Polar Bear Suit"
2010	Keep Creating	Herself	
2013	The PET Squad Files	Angel Riley	1 episode: "The Exorcism of Angel Riley"
2016	Cleverman	Ash Kerry	
