= Jack Goes Boating =

2010 film by Philip Seymour Hoffman

- Theatrical release poster
- Directed by: Philip Seymour Hoffman
- Screenplay by: Robert Glaudini
- Based on: Jack Goes Boating by Robert Glaudini
- Produced by: Emily Ziff Griffin; Beth O'Neil; Peter Saraf; Marc Turtletaub
- Starring: Philip Seymour Hoffman; Amy Ryan; John Ortiz; Daphne Rubin-Vega
- Cinematography: W. Mott Hupfel III
- Edited by: Brian A. Kates
- Music by: Grizzly Bear; Evan Lurie
- Production company: Big Beach
- Distributed by: Overture Films (through Relativity Media)
- Release dates: January 23, 2010 (Sundance); September 17, 2010 (United States)
- Running time: 91 minutes
- Country: United States
- Language: English
- Box office: $637,479

Jack Goes Boating is a 2010 American romantic drama film directed by Philip Seymour Hoffman (in his only career directorial effort) and stars Hoffman in the title role, as well as Amy Ryan, John Ortiz and Daphne Rubin-Vega. The film's script was written by Robert Glaudini, based on his 2007 play Jack Goes Boating. The film's cast was mostly the same as that of the play's premiere at The Public Theater, although Amy Ryan replaced Beth Cole (who has a cameo as a teacher). The film was produced by Overture Films and Relativity Media. It premiered at the 26th Sundance Film Festival and was later released in the United States on September 17, 2010.

== Plot ==
Jack is a shy limousine driver who lives with and works for his uncle. His best friend and co-worker Clyde and Clyde's wife Lucy set up a dinner date at their house with Lucy's new co-worker, Connie, who has intimacy issues of her own.

As Jack and Connie get to know each other, he sets his sights on learning to swim so he can take her boating when summer comes; with Clyde eager to help him learn, they begin swimming lessons. Jack soon decides that summer is too far away to wait for a date with Connie, so he decides that a nice dinner would be a good place to start. When Connie says that no one has ever cooked a meal for her, Jack decides that he wants to be the chef and cook for her. This adds another set of lessons to be learned as Jack does not know how to cook, so Clyde sets Jack up with a chef friend of Lucy's to learn the culinary art form.

As Jack strives to perfect swimming and cooking, he begins to get a look behind the veil of the marriage of his friends, which is straining under the weight of mutual occasional infidelities. As the troubles of their marriage become increasingly apparent, Jack and Connie grow closer: Her general mistrust gradually erodes, and he gains confidence and skill in relating to her and in pursuing his dream job. The film's last scene has Jack and Connie walking off happily, as a newly single Clyde looks on ambivalently.

== Cast ==
- Philip Seymour Hoffman as Jack
- Amy Ryan as Connie
- John Ortiz as Clyde
- Daphne Rubin-Vega as Lucy
- Thomas McCarthy as Dr. Bob
- Salvatore Inzerillo as Cannoli
- Richard Petrocelli as Uncle Frank
- Harry Seddon as the Teacher
- Lola Glaudini as Italian Woman
- Stephen Adly Guirgis as MTA worker
- Elizabeth Rodriguez as Waldorf Event Assistant
- Isaac Schinazi as Pastry Chef
- Mason Pettit as Drunk Man on Subway

== Production ==
Robert Glaudini’s play was originally performed in 2007 by the LAByrinth Theater Company, with Hoffman, Ortiz and Rubin-Vega performing in the same roles that they play in the film version.

The film was co-financed by Overture Films (known for The Men Who Stare at Goats and Law Abiding Citizen) and Big Beach Films (known for Little Miss Sunshine and Away We Go). In addition to directing and acting, Hoffman acted as one of the two executive producers with the other being costar John Ortiz.

Pre-production and development for the film took place in January 2009. Filming began in New York in February 2009. The Clinton Diner of Maspeth, Queens in New York City is a featured location in the film. Post-production took place in October 2009 and the film was completed in March 2010.

== Release ==
The film premiered on January 23, 2010 at the 26th Sundance Film Festival. It was later distributed by Overture Films and Relativity Media and it was released on four screens in New York City and Los Angeles on September 17, 2010. It opened to $28,916 for a $7,229 per screen average. In September and October, the film expanded reaching a maximum of 90 screens. The film's domestic theatrical run came to an end in December 2010, with the domestic gross totaling $541,992. The film was later released on DVD on January 18, 2011.

Outside of the U.S., the film was featured in a number of foreign film festivals including the Toronto International Film Festival, the Torino Film Festival, the Tokyo International Film Festival, and the Dubai International Film Festival. The film grossed $95,487 overseas, bringing its current global total gross to $637,479. It was later released in the United Kingdom on November 4, 2011.

== Reception ==
=== Critical reception ===
On Rotten Tomatoes, the film has an approval rating of 67% based on 107 reviews, with an average rating of 6.3/10. The site's critical consensus reads, "It's made the journey from stage to screen somewhat worse for wear, but Jack Goes Boating remains a sensitive, well-acted character study." On Metacritic the film has a score of 64 out of 100 based on 27 critics, indicating "generally favorable" reviews.

It was especially noted for the performances of the four leading actors, and was compared favorably with similar romantic films from the 1950s, such as Marty (1955). Simon Hattenstone of The Guardian also called the film "refreshing" as it showed Hoffman playing for a change "a regular dysfunctional guy rather than a freaky dysfunctional guy". Linda Barnard of the Toronto Star said "the dialogue makes the movie feel more a creature of stage than screen", but also noted, "The performances are ego-free and often funny", and concluded "Hoffman admirably works both sides of the camera with Jack Goes Boating, a reminder that love is indeed where you find it and works best when we don’t look too closely."

=== Awards ===
Jack Goes Boating was nominated for four major awards in 2010. For his performance as Clyde, John Ortiz was nominated for a Gotham Award in the category of Breakthrough Actor. The award went to Ronald Bronstein for his performance in Daddy Longlegs. The film was also nominated for three Independent Spirit Awards. John Ortiz was again nominated for his performance in the Best Supporting Male category but lost to John Hawkes in Winter's Bone. Daphne Rubin-Vega was also nominated for her performance as Lucy in the Best Supporting Female category but lost to Dale Dickey in Winter's Bone. Robert Glaudini was nominated in the Best First Screenplay category but lost to Lena Dunham for Tiny Furniture.

== Soundtrack ==
A soundtrack album for the film featuring the following songs is available from Lakeshore Records.

| No. | Title | Artist | Length |
|---|---|---|---|
| 1. | "Oliver James" | Fleet Foxes | 3:19 |
| 2. | "All We Ask" | Grizzly Bear | 5:21 |
| 3. | "Rivers of Babylon" | The Melodians | 4:18 |
| 4. | "Snow" | Evan Lurie | 1:18 |
| 5. | "Where Is My Love" | Cat Power | 2:53 |
| 6. | "Eat Yourself" | Goldfrapp | 4:06 |
| 7. | "White Winter Hymnal" | Fleet Foxes | 2:27 |
| 8. | "Didn't I" | Darondo | 3:28 |
| 9. | "Dearly Departed" | DeVotchKa | 5:12 |
| 10. | "Hello, Young Lovers" | Mel Tormé | 3:09 |
| 11. | "Overcome Me" | Evan Lurie | 1:59 |
| 12. | "Blue Moon" | Dave's True Story | 2:45 |
| 13. | "Peace Piece" | Bill Evans | 6:40 |
