= Glaudini =

Glaudini is a surname. Notable people with the surname include:

- Lola Glaudini (born 1971), American actress
- Robert Glaudini (born 1941), American actor, playwright, director and teacher
