= Zabryna Guevara =

American actress (b. 1972)

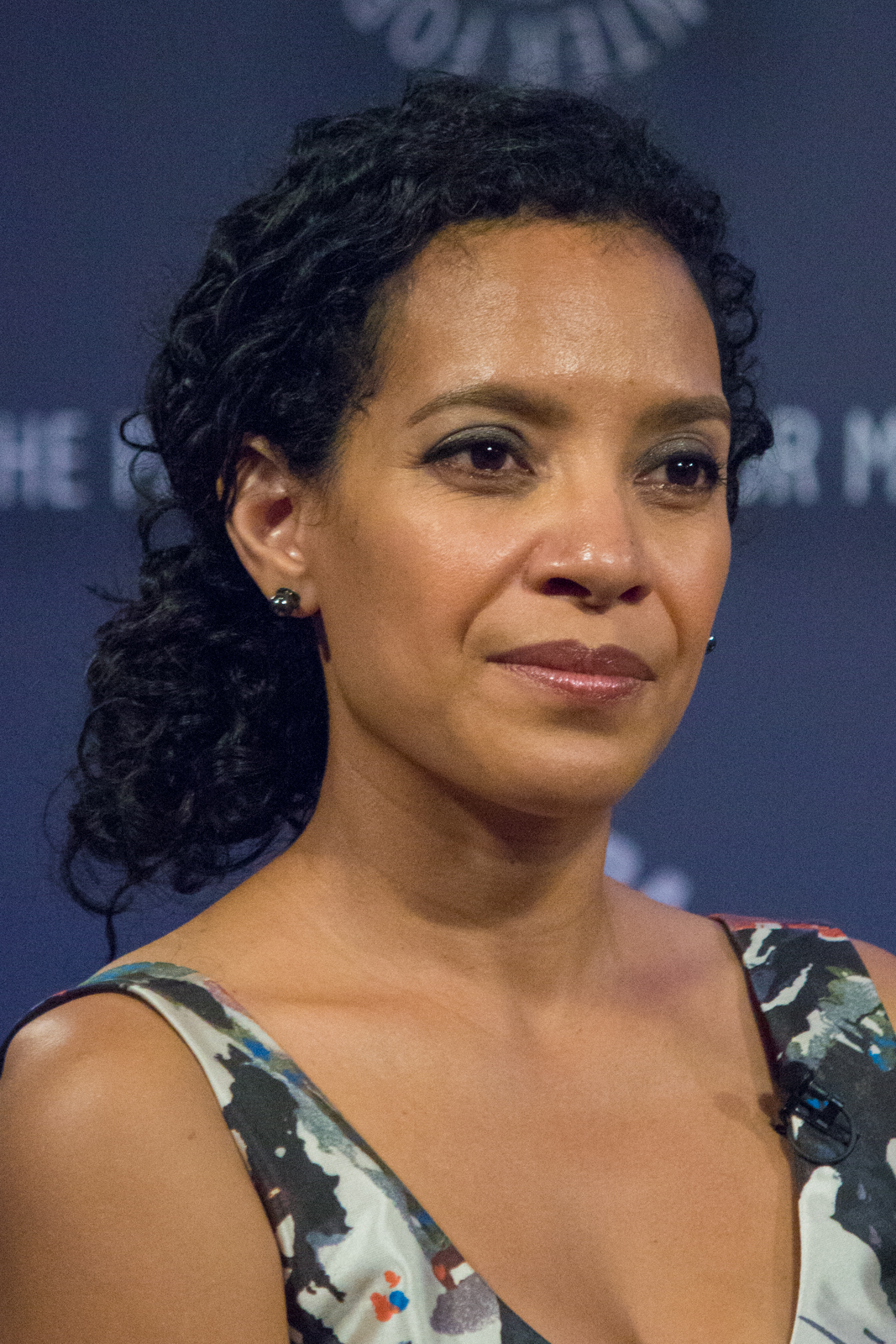
- Guevara at the 2014 NY PaleyFest 2014 for Gotham
- Born: January 12, 1972 (age 54)
- Occupation: Actress
- Years active: 1997–present
- Known for: Melania Ortiz (3 lbs); Sarah Essen (Gotham)
- Height: 5 ft 4 in (1.63 m)

Zabryna Guevara (born January 12, 1972) is an American actress. She is known for playing the role of Melania Ortiz in 3 lbs and Sarah Essen in Gotham. Guevara is also a theatrical actress and in 2013 held the role of Yazmin in the award-winning Quiara Alegría Hudes play Water by the Spoonful at Second Stage Theater.

== Career ==
Zabryna Guevara was born January 12, 1972. Her first role was in Law & Order as Lucita in 1997. Also in 1997, she starred in the film, The Hotel Manor Inn as Denise. Guevara would then guest star in 2 episodes of Law & Order: Special Victims Unit in 2002 and 2005 as Annie Colon and Julia Ortiz respectively. She would guest star in Law & Order again as Salma in 2003. In 2006, Guevara starred in the series 3 lbs as Melania Ortiz. In 2013 held the role of Yazmin in the award-winning Quiara Alegría Hudes play Water by the Spoonful at Second Stage Theater. In 2014, she landed the role of Trask's Secretary in the film X-Men: Days of Future Past. Also in 2014, Guevara landed the role of Sarah Essen in Gotham. In 2025, she appeared in the Marvel Studios Disney+ TV show Daredevil: Born Again. and the NBC series, The Hunting Party.

== Personal life ==
Born in the United States, Guevara is of Venezuelan descent.

== Filmography ==
=== Film ===
Year	Title	Role	Notes
1997	The Hotel Manor Inn	Denise	
2003	Whispers	Woman on Train	
2005	Everyone's Depressed	Donna	
2008	Marley & Me	OB-GYN Nurse	
2009	The Rebound	Teacher at Museum	
2010	All Good Things	Waitress	
2010	Pariah	Mrs. Alvarado	
2011	Yelling to the Sky	Aracely Oriol	
2012	The Guilt Trip	K-mart Executive	
2014	X-Men: Days of Future Past	Trask's Secretary	
2017	The Incredible Jessica James	Mrs. Phillips	
2018	Irreplaceable You	Dr. Michaelson	
2019	Swallow	Alice	
2026	Spider-Man: Brand New Day	Sheila Rivera	

=== Television ===
Year	Title	Role	Notes
1997	Law & Order	Lucita	Episode: "Harvest" (Season 8, Episode 4)
2001	The Sopranos	Clerk	Episode: "Employee of the Month" (Season 3, Episode 4)
2002	Law & Order: Special Victims Unit	Annie Colon	Episode: "Protection" (Season 3, Episode 12)
2003	Law & Order	Salma	Episode: "Bitch" (Season 13, Episode 15)
2005	Law & Order: Special Victims Unit	Julia Ortiz	Episode: "911" (Season 7, Episode 3)
2006	3 lbs	Melania Ortiz	6 episodes
2011	Future States	Gina	Episode: "White" (Season 2, Episode 8)
2011	Person of Interest	Monica Ramirez	Episode: "Judgment" (Season 1, Episode 5)
2012	Blue Bloods	Angela	Episode: "Women With Guns" (Season 2, Episode 16)
2012	CSI: Crime Scene Investigation	Dr. Amy Berkman	Episode: "Dune and Gloom" (Season 12, Episode 21)
2012	Common Law	Marta Perez	Episode: "In-Laws vs. Outlaws" (Season 1, Episode 10)
2012	Burn Notice	Ayn	4 episodes
2014–2015	Gotham	Sarah Essen	Main cast (20 episodes)
2016	The Get Down	Lydia Cruz	6 episodes
2016	Chicago Med	Meghan Scott	2 episodes
2017	The Handmaid's Tale	Mrs. Castillo	Episode: "A Woman's Place" (Season 1, Episode 6)
2017–2018	Snowfall	Elena Usteves	3 episodes
2018	Castle Rock	Maret	3 episodes
2018	Tell Me a Story	Detective Renee Garcia	5 episodes
2018–2021	New Amsterdam	Dora	Recurring cast (17 episodes)
2019	The Twilight Zone	Anna Fuentas	Episode: "Point of Origin"
2019–2020	Emergence	Dr. Abby Fraiser	Main role (13 episodes)
2021	Law & Order: Special Victims Unit	Dr. Catalina Machado	Episode "Wolves in Sheep's Clothing" (Season 22, Episode 16)
2021	Dr. Death	Jill Deleone	2 episodes
2022–2024	Law & Order	Defense Attorney Amanda Stanley	3 episodes
2025–2026	The Hunting Party	Elizabeth Mallory	Recurring role
2025	Will Trent	Martha Lamb	2 episodes
2025–2027	Daredevil: Born Again	Sheila Rivera	Main role (16 episodes)
2025	Happy Face	Gabriella	3 episodes
2026	Sheriff Country	Rocky	Episode: "The Hunting Party"

=== Theatre ===
Year	Title	Role	Notes
2013	Water by the Spoonful	Yazmin	At the Second Stage Theater
