= Miss You Like Hell =

Musical by Quiara Alegría Hudes

- Off-Broadway promotional poster
- Music: Erin McKeown
- Lyrics: Quiara Alegría Hudes; Erin McKeown
- Book: Quiara Alegría Hudes
- Productions: 2016 San Diego; 2018 Off-Broadway; 2019 Boston

Miss You Like Hell is a musical with book and lyrics by Quiara Alegría Hudes, and music and lyrics by Erin McKeown. The show follows a troubled teenage girl who embarks on a cross-country road trip with her estranged mother, who is an undocumented immigrant from Mexico.

The musical premiered in 2016 at the La Jolla Playhouse in San Diego.

== Background ==
Quiara Alegría Hudes was first commissioned by Christopher Ashley, Artistic Director to the La Jolla Playhouse, in February 2012 to write a new work after her success with plays such as In the Heights and Water by the Spoonful, for which she won the 2012 Pulitzer Prize for Drama.

Later that year Hudes teamed up with singer/songwriter Erin McKeown and director Lear deBessonet to write a new musical, Miss You Like Hell. The show received readings in New York in 2014 and 2015 and a three-week workshop at the La Jolla Playhouse in 2016.

== Production history ==
In August 2016 it was announced that Daphne Rubin-Vega and Krystina Alabado would star in a full production of the new musical at the Mandell Weiss Theatre at the La Jolla Playhouse.

Miss You Like Hell opened at the La Jolla Playhouse on October 25, 2016. The production was directed by Lear deBessonet and choreographed by Danny Mefford with scenic design by Donyale Werle, costume design by Emilio Sosa, and lighting design by Tyler Micoleau.

Original Cast

- Olivia – Krystina Alabado
- Mo - Cliff Bemis
- Castaway - Victor E. Chan
- Lawyer/Waitress - Vanessa A. Jones
- Higgins - David Patrick Kelly
- Manuel - Julio Monge
- Pearl - Cashaé Monya
- Officer/Legal Clerk/A Guy at a Motel Desk - Kürt Norby
- Mindy - Olivia Oguma
- Beatriz - Daphne Rubin-Vega

The off-Broadway opening was at The Public Theater on April 10, 2018, with Daphne Rubin-Vega reprising the role of Beatriz and Gizel Jimenez taking over the role of Olivia. It closed on May 13, 2018, with an original cast recording released by Ghostlight Records on October 8, 2018.

Off-Broadway Cast (The Public Theater)

- Olivia - Gizel Jimenez
- Beatriz - Daphne Rubin-Vega
- Pearl - Latoya Edwards
- Manuel - Danny Bolero
- Higgins - David Patrick Kelly
- Mo - Michael Mulheren
- Lawyer - Marinda Anderson
- Police Officer - Marcus Paul James
- Motel Desk Guy - Andrew Cristi
- Legal Clerk - Shawna M. Hamic

A production opened in Cambridge, MA on January 10, 2019 at the OBERON, produced by Company One in collaboration with the American Repertory Theater. The show ran through January 27, 2019. Further productions at local theaters in 2019 took place in Baltimore, MD and Aurora, CO.

In 2020, the show was scheduled to be performed at theaters in Olney, MD, Providence, RI, St. Louis, MO, Northampton, MA, St. Paul, MN, Washington, DC and Seattle, WA.

In 2022, the show was performed by TheatreSquared in Fayetteville, AR.

== Song list ==
Act I

- "Lioness (Prologue & Prayer)"
- "Sundays"
- "Mothers"
- "Received"
- "Yellowstone"
- "My Bell's Been Rung"
- "Over My Shoulder"
- "Bibliography"
- "Baggage"
- "Castaway Comments"
- "Tamales"
- "Now I'm Here"
- "The Dirtiest Deed"
- "Yellowstone (Reprise)"
- "Dance with Me"
- "Lioness"
- "Court Clothes"
- "Miss You Like Hell"
- "Over My Shoulder (Reprise)"
- "Epilogue"

The original production at the La Jolla Playhouse in 2016 comprised two acts and featured a number of songs that were cut and reworked in future productions:

Act I

- "Lioness Prelude"
- "Sundays"
- "Mothers"
- "Received"
- "Eat You Up"
- "Yellowstone (No Filter)"
- "In a Fix"
- "Over My Shoulder"
- "Bibliography"
- "Baggage"

Act II

- "Vecinos"
- "Received Reprise"
- "Tamales"
- "Now I'm Here"
- "The Dirtiest Deed"
- "Yellowstone (IRL)"
- "Dance with Me"
- "Lioness"
- "Sundays Reprise"
- "The Courtroom"
- "Castaway"

== Awards and nominations ==
Year	Award	Category	Work	Result	Ref.
2018	Outer Critics Circle Awards	Outstanding New Off-Broadway Musical		Nominated	
2018	Outer Critics Circle Awards	Outstanding Book of a Musical	Quiara Alegría Hudes	Nominated	
2018	Outer Critics Circle Awards	Outstanding New Score	Erin McKeown and Quiara Alegría Hudes	Nominated	
2018	Drama Desk Awards	Outstanding Music	Erin McKeown	Nominated	
2018	Drama Desk Awards	Outstanding Lyrics	Erin McKeown and Quiara Alegría Hudes	Nominated	
2018	Drama Desk Awards	Outstanding Actress in a Musical	Daphne Rubin-Vega	Nominated	
2018	Drama Desk Awards	Outstanding Actress in a Musical	Gizel Jimenez	Nominated	
2018	Drama Desk Awards	Outstanding Orchestrations	Charlie Rosen and Erin McKeown	Nominated	
