= Polenzani =

Polenzani is a surname. Notable people with the surname include:

- Matthew Polenzani (born 1968), American lyric tenor
- Rose Polenzani (born 1975), American folk musician
