= LAByrinth Theater Company =

Non-profit theater company based in NYC

- Formation: 1992
- Type: Theatre group
- Location: New York City, New York
- Artistic director: Aaron Weiner
- Website: www.labtheater.org

LAByrinth Theater Company is a non-profit, off-Broadway theater company based in New York City. Led by Philip Seymour Hoffman and John Ortiz for many years, its current artistic director is Aaron Weiner. The New York Times described it in 2014 as "an ethnically diverse downtown troupe that has mounted several critically acclaimed new works".

== History ==
LAByrinth Theater Company was founded in 1992 and was originally begun as Latino Actors Base (LAB) by Gary Perez, John Ortiz, David Deblinger, and Paul Calderón. LAB used the INTAR Theatre, on West 52nd Street. In those early days, the company attracted mainly Latino actors who would perform theatrical exercises together "for three hours each week… given the opportunity and support not only to act, but to write, direct, produce, sweep, paint, hang lights, etcetera." With time, the group adopted the LAByrinth name as it attracted a multi-cultural troupe of performers, builders and trades.

Philip Seymour Hoffman joined LAByrinth theater company in 1995 and later became one of the company’s co-artistic directors.

In 2003, LABYrinth became a residency at The Public Theater for the 2003-2004 season under artistic directors Philip Seymour Hoffman and John Ortiz.

In 2007, John Ortiz became artistic director, while Philip Seymour Hoffman and John Gould Rubin served as co-artistic directors. Rubin also became the company’s executive director.

In 2009, Mimi O’Donell, Stephen Adly Guirgis and Yul Vázquez became co-artistic directors of LAByrinth Theater Company, succeeding Philip Seymour Hoffman, John Ortiz and John Gould Rubin.

In 2013, O’Donell became sole artistic director after four seasons of sharing leadership with Guirgis and Vaźquez.

In 2017, Mimi O’Donell stepped down as artistic director after eight seasons in the company’s leadership. John Ortiz, Elizabeth Canavan and Marieke Gaboury subsequently served as interim leadership while the company searched for a new artistic director.

In 2017, Dane Laffrey, Scott Zielinski, and Michael Urie won Obie Awards presented by the American Theatre Wing.

== Notable members ==
- Carlo Alban
- Stephen Belber
- Eric Bogosian
- Ellen Burstyn
- Paul Calderon
- Bobby Cannavale
- Max Casella
- Raúl Castillo
- Chris Chalk
- Liza Colón-Zayas
- Cusi Cram
- Bob Glaudini
- Lola Glaudini
- Marco Greco
- Stephen Adly Guirgis
- Ethan Hawke
- Stephen McKinley Henderson
- Philip Seymour Hoffman
- Gillian Jacobs
- Jasmine Cephas Jones
- Ron Cephas Jones
- Margaret Ladd
- Paola Lázaro
- Brett C. Leonard
- Trevor Long
- Florencia Lozano
- Jim Martin
- Adrian Martinez
- Chris McGarry
- muMs da Schemer
- Lynn Nottage
- Alfredo Narciso
- Nyambi Nyambi
- Deirdre O’Connell
- Ana Ortiz
- John Ortiz
- Pedro Pascal
- Gary Perez
- Manny Pérez
- Judy Reyes
- Chris Rock
- Sam Rockwell
- Elizabeth Rodriguez
- Daphne Rubin-Vega
- John Patrick Shanley
- Michael Shannon
- Felix Solis
- Kohl Sudduth
- Lucy Thurber
- Yul Vazquez
- Lauren Velez
- Kate Whoriskey
- Isiah Whitlock Jr.
- Kara Young
- David Zayas
