= Sing You Sinners =

Sing You Sinners may refer to:

- Sing You Sinners (film), starring Bing Crosby, Fred MacMurray, and Donald O'Connor
- "Sing, You Sinners" (song), by Sam Coslow and W. Frank Harling, recorded by Tony Bennett
- Sing You Sinners (album), by Erin McKeown
