= Daphne Rubin-Vega =

Panamanian actress (born 1969)

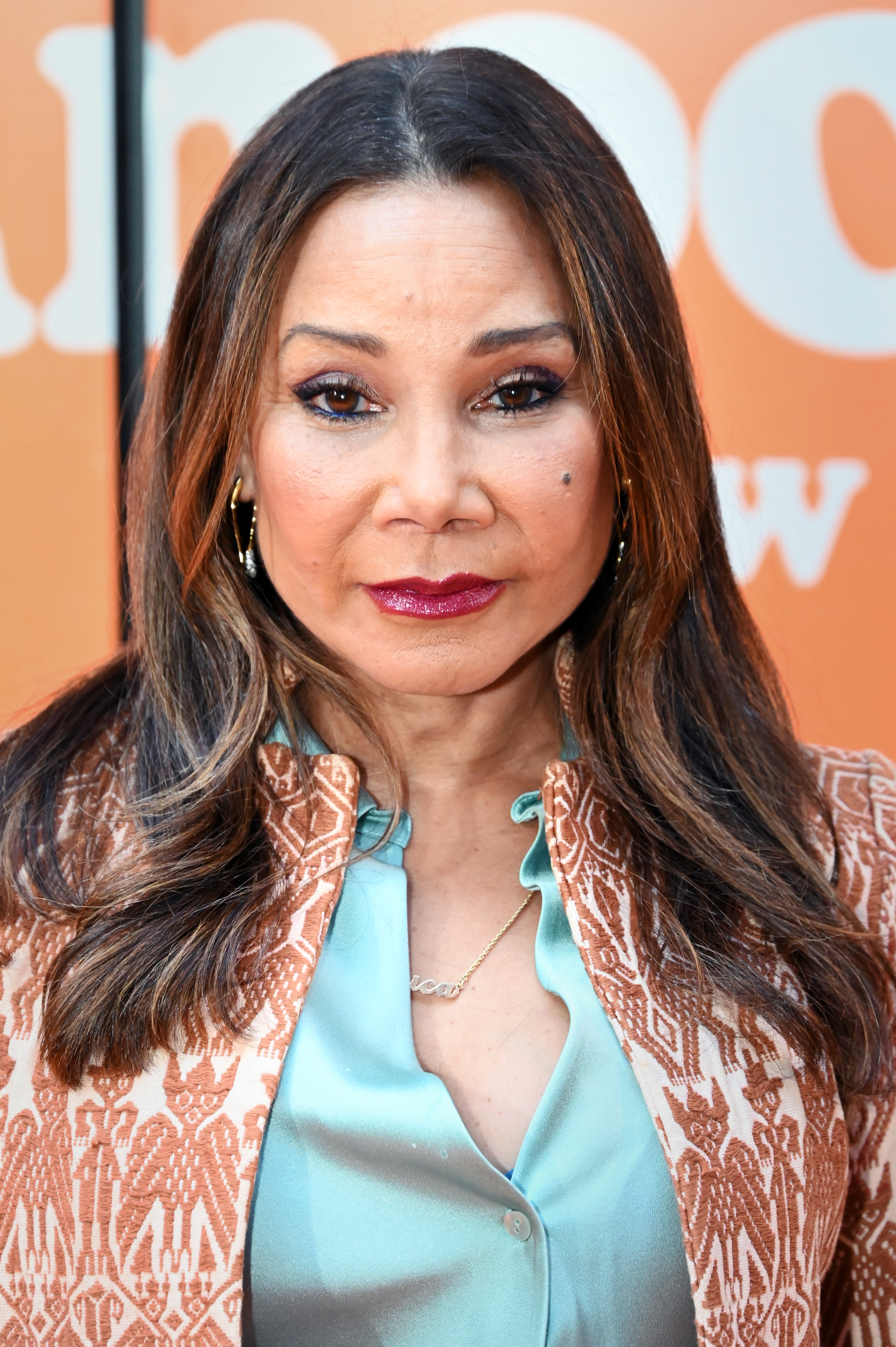
- Rubin-Vega in 2026
- Born: November 18, 1969 (age 57); Panama City, Panama
- Occupations: Actress; singer
- Years active: 1979–present
- Spouse: Thomas Costanzo (m. 2002)
- Children: 1
- Relatives: Leonard Rubin (stepfather)

Daphne Rubin-Vega (née Vega; born November 18, 1969) is a Panamanian actress and singer. She is best known for originating the roles of Mimi Marquez in the 1996 premiere of the Broadway musical Rent and Lucy in the 2007 premiere of the Off-Broadway play Jack Goes Boating.

Rubin-Vega also appeared as publicist Agnes in the second season of the TV series Smash (2012), and as Luisa Lopez in the TV series Katy Keene (2020). In 2021, Rubin-Vega starred as salon owner Daniela in the film adaptation of Lin-Manuel Miranda's In the Heights. Starting in 2024, she has voiced Carmilla Carmine in the adult animated musical animated series Hazbin Hotel.

== Early life ==
Rubin-Vega was born in Panama City, Panama, the daughter of Daphine Corina, a nurse, and José Mercedes Vega, a carpenter. Her stepfather Leonard Rubin was a writer. She also has Afro-Barbadian ancestry on her mother's side. Her mother moved from Panama to the United States with her children when Daphne was only two years old, and died eight years later.

Rubin-Vega attended New York University, in the undergraduate film and television department under Haig Manoogian, but did not graduate. In the late 1980s, she was an original member of the female vocal group Pajama Party. She studied theater at the New LAByrinth Theater Company as well as with the William Esper Studio. She also performed with the comedy group El Barrio USA.

== Career ==
=== Rent and Broadway ===
While performing with El Barrio USA, Rubin-Vega landed an audition for a new musical written and composed by Jonathan Larson. The role was for Broadway musical Rent, and the role was Mimi Marquez, a nineteen-year-old, HIV-positive heroin addict who works at the Cat Scratch Club as an exotic dancer. Before landing the role, Rubin-Vega claims that she was not a major fan of musical theater. The struggling actress auditioned for musical director Tim Weil by singing "Roxanne" by The Police. She was then handed an original number from the production and told to learn it.

Rubin-Vega performed in the original workshop before the play went to Broadway. At the time, the script was vastly different from the current version. She developed the role all the way to its Broadway premiere on April 29, 1996. She left the cast on April 5, 1997, and was replaced by Marcy Harriell. Rubin-Vega did not participate in the film adaptation of Rent, as she was pregnant at the time of the movie's casting and filming. The role subsequently went to Rosario Dawson. One of her castmates was Wilson Jermaine Heredia, with whom she also starred in the 1999 film Flawless.

Rubin-Vega has two Tony Award nominations to her credit: Best Actress in a Musical for her performance in Rent, and Best Performance by a Featured Actress in a Play for her performance as Conchita in Anna in the Tropics (2003). She won the Theatre World Award in 1996 for Rent. She was also awarded the Blockbuster Award for Best Supporting Actress in a Suspense Thriller for her role in the film Wild Things.

She later appeared in the 2000 Broadway production of The Rocky Horror Show in the role of Magenta. She continued the role through the 2001 terrorist attacks in New York, and in 2005, Rubin-Vega later recounted in an interview with Fox News that the theater had gone from selling out to barely selling any tickets at all: "It went from full house to practically two people."

She starred with Phylicia Rashad in a musical version of Federico García Lorca's The House of Bernarda Alba at Lincoln Center in March 2006. She played the role of Fantine in the 2006 Broadway revival of the popular musical Les Misérables beginning November 9. On March 2, 2007, she was replaced by Lea Salonga.

=== Later career: Jack Goes Boating and further productions ===
In February 2007, Daphne Rubin-Vega performed alongside Philip Seymour Hoffman in the play Jack Goes Boating off-Broadway at The Public Theater. She appeared in a cameo role in the 2008 feature film Sex and the City.

In November 2010, she received an Independent Spirit Awards nomination, for reprising her role in the film adaptation of Jack Goes Boating. She starred Off-Broadway as Yvette in Tommy Nohilly's world premier of Blood From A Stone at The New Group's Acorn Theater until February 19, 2011. She appeared in the Off-Broadway cast of Love, Loss, and What I Wore from March 23 to April 24, 2011. Later that year, the feature film Union Square, co-written and directed by the Sundance Film Festival's Grand Jury Award Winner, Nancy Savoca, premiered at the Toronto International Film Festival. In spring 2012, Rubin-Vega returned to Broadway in a new revival of Tennessee Williams' A Streetcar Named Desire, playing the role of Stella Kowalski opposite Blair Underwood as Stanley.

On October 25, 2016, Rubin-Vega starred as Beatriz in the world premiere of Miss You Like Hell, a new musical by Quiara Alegría Hudes and Erin McKeown, commissioned by – and staged at – the La Jolla Playhouse. The show opened off-Broadway, in the Newman Theater venue at The Public Theater, on April 10, 2018, with Rubin-Vega reprising the role.

Rubin-Vega performed the lead role in the scripted fiction podcast The Horror of Dolores Roach, which was released by Gimlet Media in October 2018. The story, co-starring Bobby Cannavale as Louis, is a contemporary reimagining of Sweeney Todd, using cannibalism as a metaphor for gentrification. Dolores Roach is an adaptation of Rubin-Vega's stage performance in the one-woman play Empanada Loca. Both Empanada Loca and Dolores Roach were written by playwright Aaron Mark especially for Rubin-Vega, who said in a Vulture interview that he "wanted to do a deep dive into a character we haven't seen depicted much in the horror cannon [sic]."

Since 2020, she has played the role of Luisa Lopez, a recurring character, in the television series Katy Keene on The CW. In 2021, she played the role of Daniela in In the Heights, earning praise for her performance from critics. Her involvement with the original musical dates back to its Off-Broadway and Broadway productions, where she provided the voice of the DJ who opens the show. She also took on the role of Maria in Saheem Ali's version of Twelfth Night; or What You Will through Shakespeare In The Park.

=== Music career ===
Rubin-Vegas was credited with being part of the backing vocal choir for David Bowie's 1986 single "Underground" from the soundtrack for the movie Labyrinth. She was the lead singer for the Latin freestyle girl group Pajama Party, placing three songs on the Billboard Hot 100 in 1989 and 1990. As a solo artist her biggest success is on the Hot Dance Music/Club Play chart, where in 1996 she hit No. 1 with the song "I Found It."

She returned to the top of the dance/club play charts in 2003 with a dance version of Elton John's "Rocketman". In 2001, she recorded her debut full-length rock album of original songs, Souvenirs. The album was never officially released after Mercury Records was purchased by Seagram. After being dropped from her label, Rubin-Vega began gifting copies out to fans, encouraging them to leak it online. The record later saw limited release for the charity Broadway Cares.

Rubin-Vega also released her second full-length album of original songs titled Redemption Songs released in October 2006 on Sh-K Boom Records.

== Personal life ==
Rubin-Vega has been married to businessman Thomas Costanzo since 2002. Their son, Luca Ariel, was born in 2004.

== Filmography ==
=== Film ===
Year	Title	Role(s)	Notes
1994	I Like It Like That	Jasmine	
1995	Lotto Land	Gloria	
1998	Wild Things	Gloria Perez	
1999	Flawless	Tia	
2001	Skeleton Woman	Olya	
2003	Virgin	Frances	
2005	Alchemy	Belladonna Editor	Uncredited
2008	Sex and the City	Baby-voiced Woman	Cameo
2008	Rachel Getting Married	Wedding Guest	Uncredited
2010	Jack Goes Boating	Lucy	
2011	Union Square	Sara	
2014	Emoticon ;)	Anna	
2021	In the Heights	Daniela	
2021	The Same Storm	Lupe Ramirez	
2021	Tick, Tick... Boom!	"Sunday" Legend 14	Cameo
2022	Allswell in New York	Serene	Also co-producer and co-writer
2023	Reverse the Curse	Eva	
2023	Ezra	Agent Margo Jenkins	

=== Television ===
Year	Title	Role(s)	Notes
1996	New York Undercover	Lydia	Episode: "Brown Like Me"
1997	Spin City	Herself	Episode: "An Affair to Remember"
2000	Happily Ever After: Fairy Tales for Every Child	Little Juanita	Voice role; episode: "Robinita Hood"
2003	Hey Joel	Michelle Ipanima	Voice role; 4 episodes
2007	Law & Order: Criminal Intent	Carmen Mendoza	Episode: "Senseless"
2013	Smash	Agnes	8 episodes
2019	Rent: Live	Extra	Special; member of the original Broadway cast
2019	Tales of the City	Mrs. Rodriguez	3 episodes
2020	Katy Keene	Luisa Lopez	9 episodes
2020	Social Distance	Reina Villareal	Episode: "A Celebration of the Human Life Cycle"
2021	The Blacklist	Delores Knapp	Episode: "Balthazar 'Bino' Baker (No. 129)"
2022	New Amsterdam	Christy Cummings	Episode: "No Ifs, Ands or Buts"
2023	Accused	Rose	Episode: "Ava's Story"
2023	The Horror of Dolores Roach	None	Executive producer only
2023	The Changeling	Mrs. Ortiz	2 episodes
2024–present	Hazbin Hotel	Carmilla Carmine	Voice role; recurring role
2024	Only Murders in the Building	Inez	4 episodes

=== Stage ===
Year	Title	Role(s)	Notes	Ref.
1996	Rent	Mimi Marquez	Nederlander Theater, Broadway	
2000	Two Sisters and a Piano	Sofia	Public Theater, Off-Broadway	
2000	The Rocky Horror Show	Magenta	Circle in the Square Theatre, Broadway	
2003	Anna in the Tropics	Conchita	Bernard B. Jacobs Theater, Broadway	
2006	Bernarda Alba	Martirio	Lincoln Center, Off-Brodway	
2006	Everything's Turning Into Beautiful	Brenda	The New Group, Off-Broadway	
2006	Les Miserables	Fantine	Broadhurst Theater, Broadway	
2007	Jack Goes Boating	Lucy	Public Theater, Off-Broadway	
2011	Blood From a Stone	Yvette	The New Group, Off-Broadway	
2012	A Streetcar Named Desire	Stella Kowalski	Broadhurst Theatre, Broadway	
2013	Romeo and Juliet	Nurse	Classic Stage Company, Off-Broadway	
2016	Daphne's Dive	Inez	Pershing Square, Off-Broadway	
2018	Miss You Like Hell	Beatriz	Public Theatre, Off-Broadway	
2022	My Broken Language	Qui Qui	Pershing Square, Off-Broadway	
2023	The Night of the Iguana	Maxine	Pershing Square, Off-Broadway	
2025	Twelfth Night	Maria	Shakespeare in the Park, Off-Broadway	
2026	The Adding Machine	Mr. Zero	The New Group, Off-Broadway	

== Discography ==
=== With Pajama Party ===
- 1989 – Up All Night
- 1991 – Can't Live Without It

=== Solo work ===
- 1994 – When You Love Someone (Single)
- 1995 – Change (Single)
- 1995 – I Found It (Single) Produced and co-written by David Anthony
- 2001 – Souvenirs
- 2003 – Rocket Man (EP)
- 2006 – Redemption Songs

=== Cast recordings and soundtracks ===
- 1996 - Rent (Original Broadway Cast Recording)
- 2000 - The Rocky Horror Show – The New Broadway Cast Recording
- 2006 - Bernarda Alba (World Premiere Recording)
- 2017 - A Very Marti Holiday
- 2018 - Miss You Like Hell (Original Cast Recording)
- 2020 - Katy Keene Special Episode - Kiss of the Spider Woman the Musical (Original Television Soundtrack)
- 2020 - Katy Keene: Season 1 (Original Television Soundtrack)
- 2021 - In The Heights (Original Motion Picture Soundtrack)
- 2024 - Hazbin Hotel (Original Soundtrack)
- 2025 - Hazbin Hotel: Season Two (Original Soundtrack)

== Awards and nominations ==
Year	Award	Category	Work	Result
1996	Tony Award	Best Performance by a Leading Actress in a Musical	Rent	Nominated
1996	Drama Desk Award	Outstanding Actress in a Musical	Rent	Nominated
1996	Theatre World Award	Theatre World Award	Rent	Won
1999	ALMA Award	Outstanding Actress in a Feature Film	Wild Things	Nominated
1999	Blockbuster Entertainment Awards	Favorite Supporting Actress – Suspense	Wild Things	Won
2001	New York International Independent Film and Video Festival	Best Actress	Skeleton Woman	Won
2004	Tony Award	Best Featured Actress in a Play	Anna in the Tropics	Nominated
2010	Independent Spirit Awards	Best Supporting Female	Jack Goes Boating	Nominated
2012	Outer Critics Circle Award	Outstanding Featured Actress in a Play	A Streetcar Named Desire	Nominated
2013	GenArt Film Festival	Feature Film	Emoticon ;)	Won
2013	Indie Series Awards	Best Supporting Actress (Drama)	Hustling	Nominated
2014	Indie Series Awards	Best Lead Actress (Drama)	Hustling	Nominated
2016	Drama Desk Award	Outstanding Solo Performance	Empanada Loca	Nominated
2016	Outer Critics Circle Award	Outstanding Solo Performance	Empanada Loca	Nominated
2018	Drama Desk Award	Outstanding Actress in a Musical	Miss You Like Hell	Nominated
2026	Imagen Awards	Best Voice-Over Actor	Hazbin Hotel	Won
