= Draw Them Near =

Studio album by Jess Klein
- Released: August 22, 2000
- Studio: Alex the Great
- Genre: Folk-pop
- Length: 43:01
- Labels: Slow River; Rykodisc
- Producer: George Howard

Jess Klein chronology
Wishes Well Disguised (1998)	Draw Them Near (2000)	Flattery (2003)

Draw Them Near is an album by the American musician Jess Klein, released in 2000. She supported it with a North American tour. Klein also participated in the Voices on the Verge tour. Draw Them Near was nominated for "Indie Album of the Year" at the Boston Music Awards. It was a minor hit on adult album alternative radio stations.

== Production ==
Recorded at Alex the Great, in Nashville, the album was produced by George Howard, the president of Rykodisc. It was mixed by Paul Q. Kolderie. The musicians listened to the guitar playing of Mick Taylor during the recording sessions, appreciating the soulfulness of his style. Ken Coomer played drums on the tracks; Will Kimbrough played guitar. Klein considered her melodies and the music to be as important as her lyrics. The majority of the songs are about difficult relationships.

== Critical reception ==
Professional ratings
Review scores
Source	Rating
AllMusic	4/5 stars
Calgary Sun	4/5
The Press of Atlantic City	3.5/4 stars
USA Today	3/4 stars

The Toronto Star called the album "a listenable blend of folk, country and rock." The New York Daily News noted that "Little White Dove" "sounds like Rod Stewart in his folksy 'Mandolin Wind' period." USA Today determined that Klein's "candy-coated voice has a sweet vulnerability, yet she avoids puppy-love confections, instead conveying plenty of wisdom and grown-up heartache in lyrics that are assertive but not strident, passionate but not melodramatic." Greil Marcus, in Interview, wrote that "the bigger the arrangement ... the more like an impostor she seems, and it's as an impostor that she's a real pop singer... You hear frustration, anonymity, someone you have to get to know before you realize how easy it is to look at her face. With all that, she seems to crawl into her own songs, not sell them."

The Press of Atlantic City said that "Klein is a folkie at heart, but her blood also flows with in-your-face rock, rhythm and blues and Memphis soul." The Providence Journal opined that "the pace of her songs laid back doesn't change enough, and too many times Klein isn't engaging, she's whining." The Calgary Sun stated that "Klein is an astonishingly poetic songwriter." The Record included Draw Them Near on its list of the best albums of 2000.

== Track listing ==
Draw Them Near track listing
No.	Title	Length
1.	"Little White Dove"	3:58
2.	"Goodbye, Goodbye"	3:13
3.	"Ireland"	3:47
4.	"Cloud Song"	3:57
5.	"Love Is Where You Find It"	3:19
6.	"Song for an Angel"	3:42
7.	"I Tried"	4:28
8.	"I Sure Would"	2:29
9.	"Springtime"	3:38
10.	"Open Me"	2:57
11.	"I'll Be Alright"	4:30
12.	"Draw Them Near"	3:03
Total length:		43:01
