= Gary Perez =

American actor (born 1962)

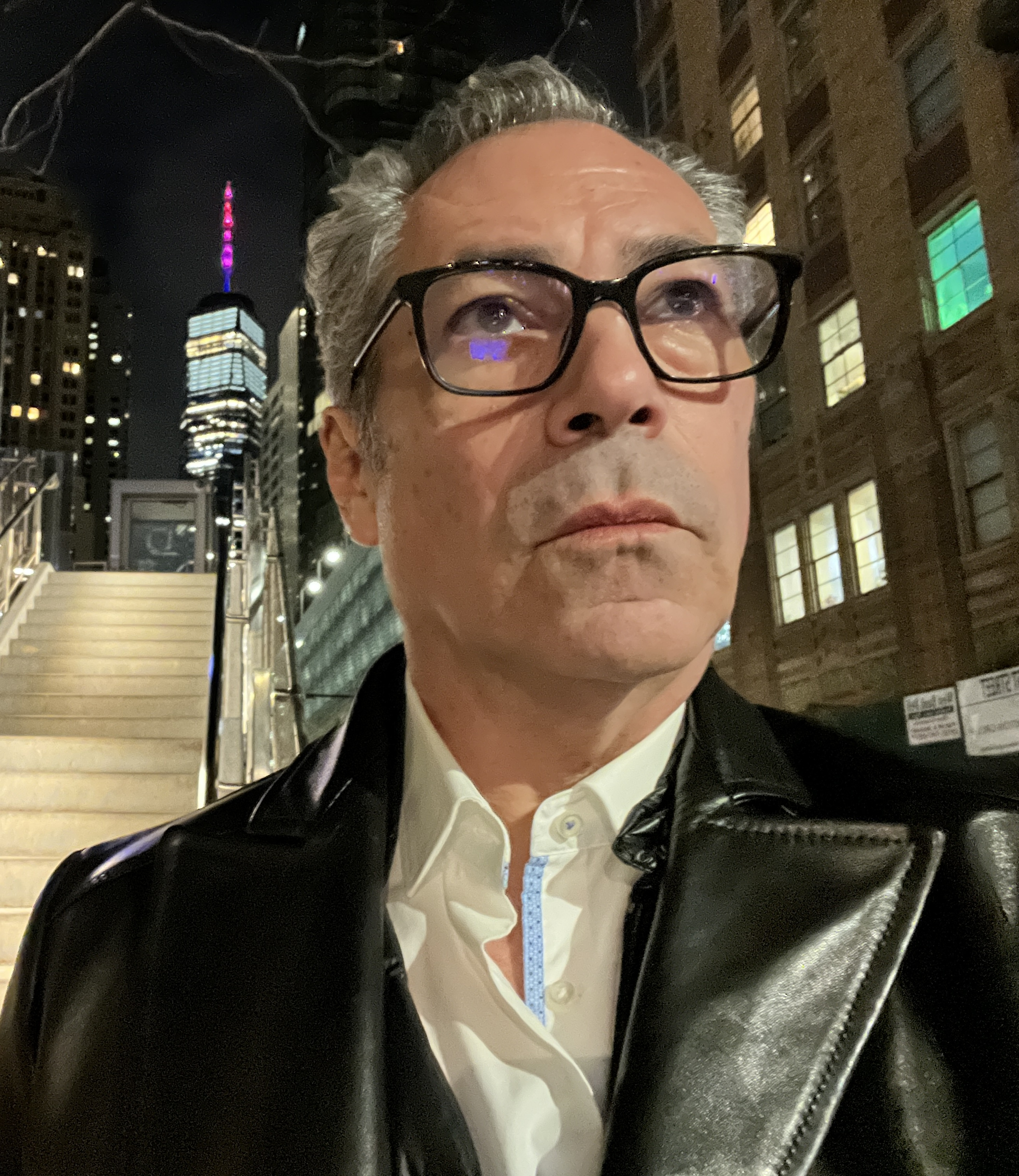
- Perez in 2022
- Born: April 12, 1962 (age 64); New York City, New York, U.S.
- Notable work: Between Riverside and Crazy at the Helen Hayes Theater Broadway – When They See Us – 13 Reasons Why – Fatal Attraction
- Website: www.ActorCameraCraft.com

Gary Perez (born April 12, 1962) is an American television, film, and stage actor.

He is of Puerto Rican descent and considers himself a Nuyorican.

== Early life and education ==
Perez began his pursuit in the performing arts by attending the School of Performing Arts in Manhattan, where he studied ballet.

== Career ==
Perez began his career doing off-Broadway theater at the INTAR Theatre, where he was cast in Luis Santeiro's Our Lady of the Tortilla, directed by Max Ferra. Because Ferra liked Perez, he gave him the keys to INTAR's other space, INTAR 2, located on 52nd Street in Manhattan. Intar 2 would later become the original home of Latino Actors Base founded by Perez, John Ortiz, David Deblinger, and Paul Calderon. Latino Actors Base became known as LAByrinth Theater Company.

One of Perez's first television jobs was on the soap opera As the World Turns (1995–2002), where he recurred as Detective Joe Ramirez. Later, he would go on to appear on Cosby, New York Undercover, NYPD Blue, and Third Watch.

He was cast in one of his first films by Spike Lee in Crooklyn, where he played "Juan" the Bodega man. He was cast to play opposite Frank Langella in the Nickelodeon Network's television film Cry Baby Lane.

Perez then had recurring roles on television series, including The Sopranos as FBI Agent Marquez and Oz, as the head of the parole board, Luis Ruiz.

== Theater ==
Perez made his Broadway theatre debut in 2023 with the Pulitzer Prize-winning play Between Riverside and Crazy by Stephen Adly Guirgis. Directed by Austin Pendleton at the Helen Hayes Theater, Perez appeared as Lt. Dave Caro.

He has worked with many other writers, including Pulitzer Prize winners John Patrick Shanley, Nilo Cruz, and Lynn Nottage. He has also worked with multiple award-winning directors, including Anna D. Shapiro, Tony Taccone in Jose Rivera's Cloud Tectonics, Brian Kulick, and Jo Bonney at theaters including Steppenwolf Theatre Company, Yale Repertory Theatre (in another Jose Rivera play Boleros for the Disenchanted), Second Stage Theater, McCarter Theatre, La Jolla Playhouse, Berkeley Repertory Theatre, New York Theatre Workshop and The Public Theater.

Perez was nominated for a Jeff Award for his portrayal of Cousin Julio in Steppenwolf's historic first all-Latino cast of The Motherfucker with the Hat, directed by Anna D. Shapiro.

== Television and film ==
Perez has aimed much of his career toward working in front of the camera, doing the film Illegal Tender and a lead role opposite friend and long-time LAByrinth Theater Company member Florencia Lozano in Life After You.

In addition, he has had many television guest star roles in shows, including Without a Trace, Numbers, The Unit, Lie to Me, Prime Suspect, Awake, The Closer, Person of Interest, NCIS: Los Angeles, Madam Secretary, Chicago P.D., Blue Bloods, Homeland, New Amsterdam, Law & Order: Special Victims Unit, Instinct, Prodigal Son, Tommy, Little America, The Resident, When They See Us, and several episodes of Law & Order, playing various roles but more recently as Judge Sydney Bolden.

Some notable television appearances have been recurring roles on 13 Reasons Why (as Arturo Padilla), The Last Ship, The Blacklist, City on a Hill, and Fatal Attraction (for Paramount+, as Rolando Cabral, opposite Joshua Jackson), and the CBS police drama East New York.
