= Monday Morning Cold =

Studio album by Erin McKeown
- Released: 1999
- Genre: rock music/folk music
- Label: TVP Records

Erin McKeown chronology
Monday Morning Cold (1999)	Distillation (2000)

Professional ratings
Review scores
Source	Rating
Allmusic	link

Monday Morning Cold is the first album by musician Erin McKeown. It was released in 1999 via her own record label, TVP Records, while she was still a student at Brown University. The album was re-released in 2001 following the success of her second album, Distillation.

== Track listing ==
1. Fast As I Can
2. Lullaby in Three/Four
3. My Hips
4. Monday Morning Cold
5. Easy Baby
6. Softly Moses
7. Glass
8. Fast As I Can
9. How to Open My Heart in 4 Easy Steps
10. Something Comes
11. You Don't Know
