= Lotto Land =

1995 film directed by John Rubino

- Directed by: John Rubino
- Written by: John Rubino
- Produced by: John Rubino; Michael J. Rubino
- Starring: Lawrence Gilliard Jr.
- Cinematography: Rufus Standefer
- Edited by: Jack Haigis
- Music by: The Holmes Brothers
- Distributed by: Cinepix Film Properties
- Release date: June 1995 (Avignon Film Festival)
- Running time: 87 minutes
- Country: United States
- Language: English

Lotto Land is a 1995 American drama film starring Lawrence Gilliard Jr. and Wendell Holmes.

== Plot ==
The picture combines the storylines of two single-parent households in a poor, racially-diverse part of Brooklyn. One story concerns a young black man, who would like to remove himself from his drug-using friends. The young man falls in love with a Latina girl, who is intending to go to university on a full scholarship. The second story entwines the lives of those characters' parents: the mother of one character works in the local liquor store; the father of the other works for the telephone company. The narrative unfolds as a winning lottery ticket worth twenty-seven million dollars is sold to a local customer at the liquor store.

== Cast ==
- Lawrence Gilliard Jr. as Hank
- Wendell Holmes as Milt
- Barbara Gonzalez as Joy
- Suzanne Costallos as Florence
- Jaime Tirelli as Popi
- Paul Calderón as Reinaldo
- Luis Guzmán as Ricki
- Terrence Howard as Warren
- John Ortiz as Coco
- Daphne Rubin-Vega as Gloria
