= Jim Klein =

American songwriter

- Origin: Los Angeles, California United States
- Genres: Film score, pop rock
- Occupations: Composer, Producer, Songwriter, Recording Engineer
- Instruments: Guitar, Keyboards, MIDI
- Years active: 1983-present

Jim Klein is a Los Angeles born, Philadelphia-based, Emmy Award-winning composer, music producer, recording engineer, and songwriter. Klein is best known as the producer and songwriter behind the influential freestyle group Pajama Party, whose albums produced several hit singles. He is also a published author.

== Career ==
=== Engineering, Production, and Songwriting ===
After graduating from college, Klein moved to New York City and became a staff engineer at Noise NY recording studios. In the 1980s, Klein worked on numerous major and indie label projects, as well as recordings for film scores. His production and engineering credits during this period include work with Band of Susans, The Raunch Hands, Bernard Edwards, hip-hop pioneers Stetsasonic, TriStar Films, Mantronix, Uproar, Joyce Sims, Miramax Films, Sequal, and other artists at Platinum Island, a multi-room recording studio in New York City. Later, he began to focus on production, songwriting and composition. He was signed to an exclusive songwriting deal with the Famous Music division of Paramount Pictures, where he wrote more than two dozen songs for major label artists including Billy Squier, Brenda K. Starr, Alisha, and Sweet Sensation.

=== Pajama Party ===
During the early 1980s, a new style of music developed in the Latino communities of New York City influenced by hip-hop, electro-funk, and a mix of electronic instruments and syncopated percussion. It was in this burgeoning creative scene that Klein made a particular impact. As a producer and songwriter, Klein is best known for his work with the freestyle band Pajama Party, which he created in 1987 with songwriting partner Peggy Sendars. He served as producer, engineer, synth and MIDI programmer, instrumentalist, and songwriter on their two Atlantic Records releases. The first of these, Up All Night, produced three Billboard Hot 100 singles, "Yo No Se'," "Over and Over," and "Hide and Seek," as well as several Top 20 dance hits. Today, "Yo No Se" is widely considered an important song in the genre and it continues to be re-released on numerous freestyle compilations.

=== Television and Film Composition ===
In the 1990s Klein began composing for television and advertisements including major brands like Coca-Cola, Pillsbury, Bacardi, Canon, Glad, Secret, Bounty, AT&T, and McDonald's. He has written underscores featured on major television programs including the Beijing, Sydney, and Lake Placid Olympic Games, The Oprah Winfrey Show, The Today Show, Behind the Music, Martha Stewart Living and more. Additionally, he worked as a television composer for The Wubbulous World of Dr. Seuss and Nickelodeon's cult-classic The Adventures of Pete & Pete. In 2000, Klein became a composer for ABC's long-running series All My Children. His work on the show earned him eight Daytime Emmy nominations including two nominations for Best Original Song and two wins and four additional nominations for Outstanding Achievement in Music Direction and Composition Klein continued as a composer for the show until its finale in 2011.

At the same time, he composed several film scores including Miramax's English language release of City on Fire, and composed additional music for other studio feature films, including Paramount's The Weather Man, Millennium's Relative Strangers, Mozart and the Whale, and All I Want.

=== Solo CD ===
Klein currently works out of his personal recording space, The Blue Room, outside of Philadelphia and continues to compose for film and television. Klein released his first solo instrumental album in October 2012 entitled The Light at the End.

=== Drexel University ===
In 2003, he accepted a faculty position in the Music Industry Program at Drexel University in Philadelphia where he taught courses in music and audio freelancing, music production, and audio engineering. There, he worked with MAD Dragon Records, a student-run record label that is part of Drexel's Music Industry Entities and is distributed nationally by Ryko Distribution, to produce albums for Matt Duke (along with Stewart Lerman and Steuart Smith), Andrew Lipke, and the XYX compilation. Andrew Lipke's song "Untitled Song #1" went on to earn a nomination in the Independent Music Awards. He retired from teaching in 2020.

=== Book ===
In 2012, he released a book entitled Welcome to the Jungle: A Success Manual for Music and Audio Freelancers, published by Hal Leonard, a leading publisher of music-related books. According to the publisher, the book seeks to help readers learn about "setting goals, networking, building a portfolio, time management, personal and professional finances, and dealing with the ups and downs of the freelance career".

== Awards ==
Daytime Emmy Awards
Year	Category	TV Show / Song	Result
2003	Outstanding Achievement in Music Direction and Composition for a Drama Series	All My Children	Won
2004	Outstanding Achievement in Music Direction and Composition for a Drama Series	All My Children	Nominated
2005	Outstanding Achievement in Music Direction and Composition for a Drama Series	All My Children	Won
2008	Outstanding Achievement in Music Direction and Composition for a Drama Series	All My Children	Nominated
2008	Outstanding Original Song	All My Children: "Treasure of Love"	Nominated
2008	Outstanding Original Song	All My Children: "The Me Inside"	Nominated
2009	Outstanding Achievement in Music Direction and Composition for a Drama Series	All My Children	Nominated
2012	Outstanding Achievement in Music Direction and Composition for a Drama Series	All My Children	Nominated

== Discography ==
Year	Artist	Album	Song	Credit	Record label
1985	Stetsasonic	Just Say Stet	"Rock De La Stet"	Co-Producer, Engineer	Tommy Boy Music
1986	The Raunch Hands	El Rauncho Grande	Album	Mixer	Relativity
1986	Various	The Uproar Tapes Volume 1	Album	Engineer	Island/Antilles
1986	The Raunch Hands	Learn To Whap-A-Dang	Album	Producer	Relativity
1986	Downes & Price	Downes & Price	"Where Does Love Go"	Songwriter	Atlantic Records
1987	Joyce Sims	Come Into My Life	Single	Engineer	London Records
1987	Ichabod Stowe	The Legendary Ichabod Stowe	Album	Producer	Gadfly Records
1987	Brenda K. Starr	Brenda K. Starr	"Over and Over"	Writer	MCA Records
1987	Pajama Party	Yo No Sé	Single	Producer, Songwriter, Engineer, Performer	23 West Records, Atlantic
1987	Bipo	Crack is Wack	Album	Producer, Engineer, Songwriter	Jump Street Records
1988	Mantronix	In Full Effect	"Love Letter (Dear Tracy)"	Engineer	Capitol Records
1988	Sequal	Sequal	Album	Engineer	Capitol Records
1988	Band of Susans	Hope Against Hope	Album	Engineer	Blast First
1989	Band of Susans	Love Agenda	Album	Engineer	Blast First
1989	Billy Squier	Hear & Now	"Mine Tonite"	Songwriter	Capitol Records
1989	Pajama Party	Over and Over	Single	Producer, Songwriter, Engineer, Performer	Atlantic
1989	Pajama Party	Hide and Seek	Single	Producer, Songwriter, Engineer, Performer	Atlantic
1989	Band of Susans	Hard Light	Album	Engineer	Blast First
1989	Pajama Party	Up All Night	Album	Producer, Songwriter, Engineer, Performer	Atlantic
1990	Sweet Sensation	Love Child	"Destiny"	Performer, Songwriter	ATCO Records
1990	Natasha's Brother	Always Come Back to You	"(Shoot) The Look Of Love"	Songwriter	Atlantic Records
1990	Natasha's Brother	Always Come Back to You	"(You Keep Me) Running Back To You"	Songwriter	Atlantic Records
1990	Alisha	Bounce Back	"I Need Forever"	Writer	MCA Records
1991	Pajama Party	Can't Live Without It	Album	Producer, Songwriter, Engineer, Performer	Atlantic
1991	Pajama Party	Got My Eye on You	Single	Producer, Songwriter, Engineer, Performer	Atlantic
1992	Pajama Party	Best Of Freestyle- Various Artists	"Yo No Sé"	Producer, Songwriter, Engineer, Performer	Atlantic
1994	Pajama Party	Freestyle Greatest Beats: The Complete Collection Volume 05	"Yo No Sé"	Producer, Songwriter, Engineer, Performer	Tommy Boy Records
1994	Pajama Party	Freestyle's Greatest Hits	"Yo No Sé"	Producer, Songwriter, Engineer, Performer	Turnstyle Music
1994	Beat Commandos Featuring Rochelle	Feel the Vibe	Single	Producer, Engineer, Songwriter	Dana Records
1997	Pajama Party	The Best Freestyle Album In The Universe Vol. 3	"Yo No Se"	Producer, Songwriter, Engineer, Performer	Essex Entertainment, Inc.
1997	Pajama Party	Freestyle Greatest Beats: The Complete Collection Volume 09	"Over and Over"	Producer, Songwriter, Engineer, Performer	Tommy Boy Records
1997	Pajama Party	Disco Queens: The 80's	"Yo No Sé"	Producer, Songwriter, Engineer, Performer	Rhino
1997	Pajama Party	Best Freestyle Album in the Universe Vol. 2	"Yo No Sé"	Producer, Songwriter, Engineer, Performer	Essex
2003	Trisha O'Keefe	All The Honest Liars	Album	Producer, Engineer, Performer	Independent
2006	Matt Duke	Winter Child	Album	Producer	MAD Dragon Records
2006	Andrew Lipke	The Way Home	Album	Producer	MAD Dragon Records
2008	Joyce Sims	FFRR Black - The Platinum Collection	"Come Into My Life"	Engineer	Warner Platinum
2010	Pajama Party	Legends of Freestyle Vol. 2	"Yo No Sé"	Producer, Songwriter, Engineer, Performer	Breaknite Records
