= Jess Klein =

American musician and singer-songwriter

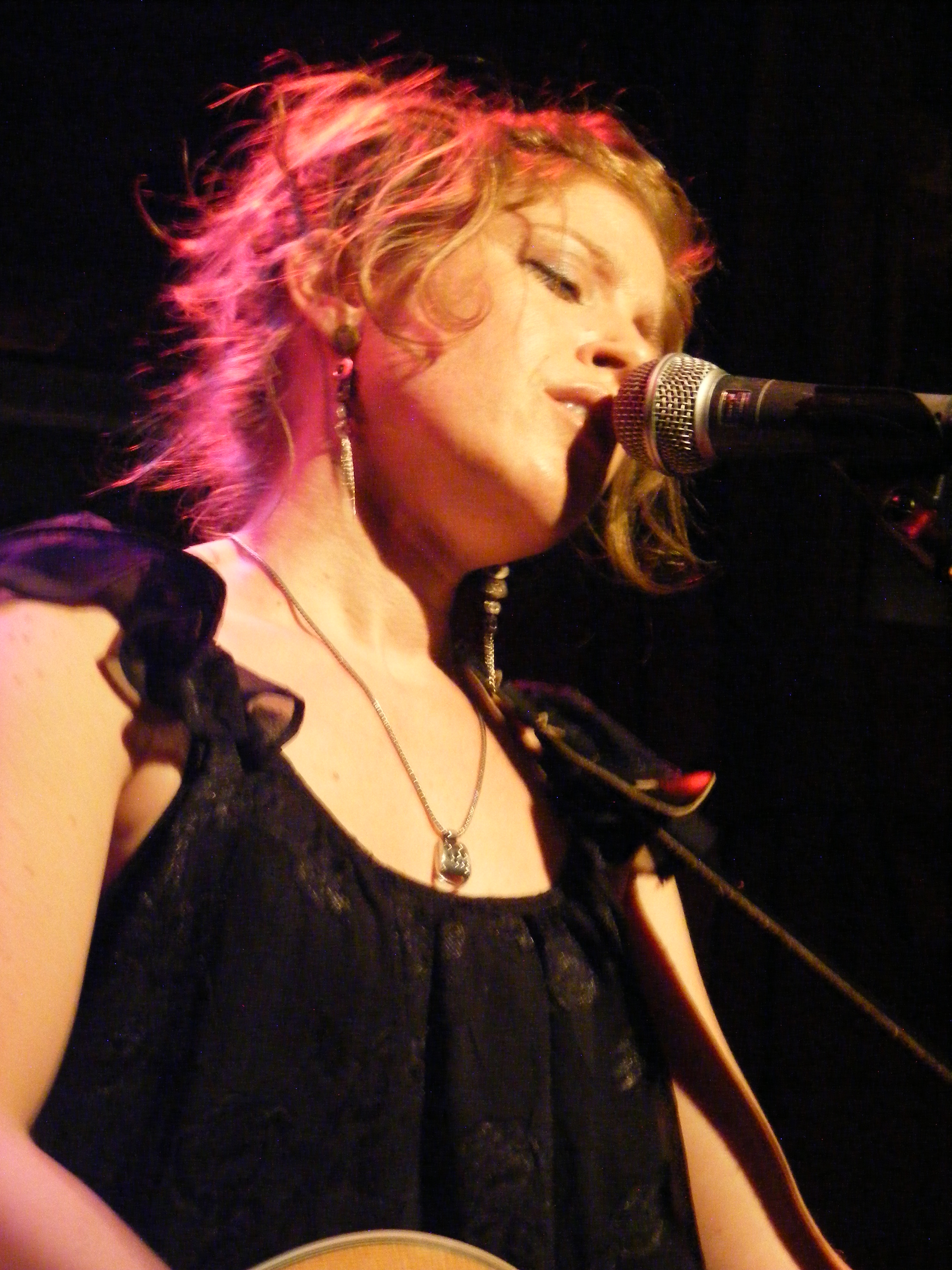
- Klein singing at Rockwood Music Hall

Background information
- Born: 1974 (age 50–51) Rochester, New York, U.S.
- Origin: Rochester, New York City
- Genres: Folk, blues
- Occupation(s): Musician, songwriter
- Instrument(s): Guitar, vocals
- Years active: 1993–present
- Labels: United For Opportunity
- Website: JessKlein.com

Jess Klein (born 1974) is an American singer-songwriter. A native of Rochester, New York, Klein learned to play acoustic guitar and started writing songs as a college student in Kingston, Jamaica, while working on a thesis "documenting dub poets and studying the musical landscape of that country." Klein moved to Boston upon her return home, and began performing locally. After independently releasing her first two albums, winning the Telluride Troubadour Songwriting Contest, and garnering several Boston Music Award nominations, she was signed to Rykodisc in 2000 by then-president George Howard.

Klein's first release for Ryko, Draw Them Near, launched Klein on a worldwide tour where she performed before 70,000 attendees at the Fuji Rock Festival in Japan. Returning to the U.S., Klein joined the songwriter collective Voices on the Verge, along with Erin McKeown, Rose Polenzani, and Beth Amsel. The foursome performed Klein's song "Little White Dove" on Good Morning America.

Klein's second solo effort for Ryko, Strawberry Lover, was produced by RCA recording artist Marc Copely. It debuted as the number-one most-added album at triple A radio a week before its release, was given four stars by MOJO, and received a plug from the nearly 80 million readership Parade. In 2005, Nerdcore Rapper MC Frontalot posted on his website a rap breakdown using the beat from the Jess Klein song "Soda Water".

Klein's sixth album, City Garden (five stars, MOJO Magazine) caused the Boston Globe to describe her as "Quite simply one of the most gifted performers this area has produced."

== Discography ==
- Wishes Well Disguised (1998)
- Draw Them Near (2000)
- Flattery (re-released in 2003)
- Strawberry Lover (2005)
- City Garden (2006)
- House of Satisfaction (2007)
- Bound to Love (2009)
- Behind a Veil (2012)
- Learning Faith (2014)
- Bootleg (2015)
- Back to My Green (2019)
- When We Rise (2023)
