= Distillation (Erin McKeown album) =

Studio album by Erin McKeown
- Released: 2000
- Recorded: October 1999; Sackamusic Studios, Amherst MA
- Genre: Folk rock; contemporary folk
- Length: 40:53
- Label: Signature Sounds
- Producer: Dave Chalfant

Erin McKeown chronology
| Monday Morning Cold (1999) | Distillation (2000) | Grand (2003) |

Professional ratings
Review scores
| Source | Rating |
|---|---|
| AllMusic | 4/5 stars |

Distillation is the second album by musician Erin McKeown. It was released via Signature Sounds in 2000.

== Track listing ==
1. "Queen of Quiet" – 1:48
2. "Blackbirds" – 4:25
3. "Didn't They?" – 2:16
4. "La Petite Mort" – 3:01
5. "The Little Cowboy" – 4:04
6. "Daisy and Prudence" 4:53
7. "Fast as I Can" – 4:46
8. "You Mustn't Kick It Around" – 2:19
9. "How to Open My Heart in 4 Easy Steps" – 5:55
10. "Dirt Gardener" – 3:36
11. "Love in 2 Parts" – 3:44
