= John Ortiz =

American actor

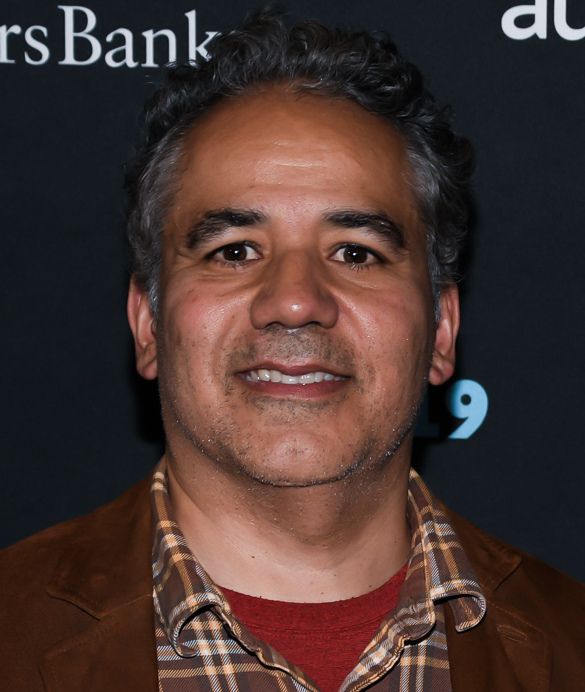
- Ortiz in 2019
- Born: Bushwick, Brooklyn, New York, U.S.
- Occupations: Actor; artistic director
- Years active: 1992–present
- Spouse: Jennifer Ortiz
- Children: 1

John Augustin Ortiz is an American actor. He is known for his antagonist role as Arturo Braga in Fast & Furious (2009) and Fast & Furious 6 (2013), and Clyde in Jack Goes Boating (2010), which earned him a nomination for the Independent Spirit Award for Best Supporting Actor. He is also an artistic director/co-founder of the LAByrinth Theater Company.

Ortiz's other film performances include Guajiro in Carlito's Way (1993), Sheriff Eddie Morales in Aliens vs. Predator: Requiem (2007), Javier J. Rivera in American Gangster (2007), officer Reuben "Sandy" Santiago in Pride and Glory (2008), Ronnie in Silver Linings Playbook (2012), Victor Nieves in Kong: Skull Island (2017), Dr. Powell in Bumblebee (2018) and Arthur in American Fiction (2023). He is also known for his collaborations with director Michael Mann, having appeared in three of his films: Miami Vice (2006), Public Enemies (2009), and Blackhat (2015).

== Personal life ==
Ortiz was born and raised in the Bushwick neighborhood of Brooklyn, New York; he is of Puerto Rican ancestry. He graduated from John Dewey High School in Brooklyn, where he met his wife. Ortiz resided in that borough with his wife Jennifer and son Clemente until 2010, when he and his family moved to California.

== Career ==
In 1993, John made his film debut as Al Pacino's young cousin Guajiro in Carlito's Way. He has gone on to appear in over 30 films, including El Cantante, Take the Lead, Before Night Falls, Amistad, Ransom, and Narc. His recent film performances include those in Michael Mann's Miami Vice as drug lord Jose Yero, Ridley Scott's American Gangster as Russell Crowe's partner Javy Rivera, and Travis Knight's Bumblebee as scientist Dr. Powell.

Among Ortiz's television roles, he has played the lead in J. J. Abrams's Hope Against Hope for HBO, a series regular on Denis Leary's series The Job and CBS's Clubhouse as well as the NBC cop drama Blue Blood, directed by Brett Ratner.

In 1992, Ortiz formed Latino Actors Base with thirteen other Latino actors. Today, that ensemble is known as LAByrinth Theater Company: an award-winning troupe of over one hundred artists from a wide range of cultural backgrounds and creative disciplines.

With LAByrinth, he played the role of Clyde in the world premiere of Jack Goes Boating by Bob Glaudini (Drama Desk nomination). In 2006, he appeared as Che Guevara in the world premiere of School of the Americas by Jose Rivera, a co-production between LAByrinth Theater Company and The Public Theater. Other co-productions between LAByrinth and the Public include the role of Jesus in the world premiere of The Last Days of Judas Iscariot by Stephen Adly Guirgis, and José Solo in Guinea Pig Solo by Brett C. Leonard. Other LAByrinth Theater credits include Jesus Hopped the A Train by Stephen Adly Guirgis in London and New York (Drama Desk nomination, Drama League Award) and Where's My Money? written and directed by John Patrick Shanley.

In 2003, Ortiz made his Broadway debut in Nilo Cruz' Pulitzer Prize winning play Anna in the Tropics. He appeared in three world premiere plays by José Rivera: The Adoration of the Old Woman at La Jolla Playhouse, Sueño at MCC Theater and The Street of the Sun at Mark Taper Forum. He was also featured in two New York premieres of Rivera's plays: References to Salvador Dalí Make Me Hot at the Public Theater (OBIE Award) and Cloud Tectonics at Playwrights Horizons. Ortiz also appeared in The Skin of Our Teeth and De Donde at the Public Theater; the world tours of The Merchant of Venice and The Persians directed by Peter Sellars; House Arrest at Arena Stage; and the national tour of A Few Good Men; Pentecost at Yale Repertory Theatre.

=== Recent projects ===
Ortiz appeared in the feature films Aliens vs. Predator: Requiem, Pride and Glory, Public Enemies, Fast & Furious, and Jack Goes Boating, directed by Philip Seymour Hoffman, in January 2009. In Summer 2009, he starred on stage in Othello at the Vienna Festival. Beginning in December 2012, he appeared as Jackie in the Stephen Adly Guirgis play The Motherfucker with the Hat at Chicago's Steppenwolf Theatre Company. He also co-starred in Silver Linings Playbook.

== Filmography ==
=== Film ===
Year	Film	Role	Notes
1993	Carlito's Way	Guajiro	
1993	Italian Movie	Cesar	
1995	Lotto Land	Coco	
1996	Ransom	Roberto	
1996	Sgt. Bilko	Spc. Luis Clemente	
1997	Amistad	Montes	
1998	Side Streets	Ramon Yanes	
1999	The Last Marshal	Enrico	
2000	The Opportunists	Ismael Espinoza	
2000	Before Night Falls	Juann Abreu	
2001	3 A.M.	Hector	
2002	Narc	Octavio Ruiz	
2006	El Cantante	Willie Colón	
2006	Take the Lead	Mr. Temple	
2006	Miami Vice	Jose Yero	
2006	The Deep and Dreamless Sleep	Mervin	
2007	Aliens vs. Predator: Requiem	Sheriff Eddie Morales	
2007	American Gangster	Javier J. Rivera	Nominated—Screen Actors Guild Award for Outstanding Performance by a Cast in a Motion Picture
2008	Pride and Glory	Ruben Santiago	
2009	Public Enemies	Phil D'Andrea	
2009	Fast & Furious	Ramon Campos/Arturo Braga	
2010	Jack Goes Boating	Clyde	Also executive producer Nominated—Gotham Independent Film Award for Breakthrough Actor; Nominated—Independent Spirit Award for Best Supporting Male
2012	Silver Linings Playbook	Ronnie	
2013	Fast & Furious 6	Arturo Braga	Cameo
2014	César Chávez	Eli Ordonez	
2014	The Drop	Detective Torres	
2015	Blackhat	Henry Pollack	
2015	Steve Jobs	Joel Pforzheimer	
2016	The Finest Hours	Seaman Wallace Quirey	
2016	A Woman, a Part	Isaac	
2017	A Dog's Purpose	Carlos	
2017	Kong: Skull Island	Victor Nieves	
2017	Going in Style	Jesús Garcia	
2018	Nostalgia	Daniel Kalman	
2018	The Cloverfield Paradox	Monk Acosta	
2018	Peppermint	Detective Moises Beltran	
2018	Replicas	Jones	
2018	Bumblebee	Dr. Powell	
2019	Ad Astra	Lieutenant General Rivas	
2019	Ms. White Light	Gary	
2020	Horse Girl	Ron	
2021	The Fallout	Carlos Cavell	
2023	American Fiction	Arthur	
2023	Poolman	Wayne / Dirk Pfumpter	
~~2024~~	The Mothership		Filmed in 2021, abandoned in 2024 during endless post-production
2025	The Diamond King	Narrator	Documentary
2025	Nobody 2	Wyatt Martin	
2026	Whalefall	Hewey	

=== Television ===
Year	Film	Role	Notes
1992–2008	Law & Order	Roberto Martinez / Victor Vargas	Guest (2 episodes)
1995	New York Undercover		Episode: Olde Tyme Religion
1996	Lush Life	Nelson 'Margarita' Marquez	Regular (7 episodes)
1997	Touched by an Angel	Nicky	Guest (2 episodes)
1997	Riot	Ciaco	TV movie
2001–2002	The Job	Ruben Somarriba	Regular (19 episodes)
2003	The Handler	DEA Agent	Episode: - Homewrecker's Ball
2004	Law & Order: Special Victims Unit	Officer Zermeño	Episode: Charisma
2004–2005	Clubhouse	Carlos Tavares	Regular (10 episodes)
2007	CSI: Miami	Gabriel Soto	Episode: Guerillas in the Mist
2008	Blue Blood	Hector	TV movie
2009	Anatomy of Hope	Tom Hernandez	TV movie
2009	Medium	Agent Daniel Muñoz	Episode: Bring Me the Head of Oswaldo Castillo
2011–2012	Luck	Turo Escalante	Regular (9 episodes)
2014	Rake	Ben Leon	Regular (13 episodes)
2015–2016	Togetherness	David	Recurring (7 episodes)
2017	The Guest Book	Paul	Guest (2 episodes)
2018	Mayans MC	Esai "Taino" Osorio	Regular
2019	The Handmaid's Tale	Principal Jim	Guest
2020	Messiah	Felix Iguero	Regular (10 episodes)
2020	Little America	Squash Coach	Episode: The Jaguar
2022	Promised Land	Joe Sandoval	Lead (Main Cast) (10 episodes)
2022	Better Things	Ranger	Episode: "We Are Not Alone"
2024, 2026	Will Trent	Antonio Miranda	Recurring (seasons 2 & 4)
2024	Bad Monkey	Rogelio	Recurring
2024	The Madness	Franco Quinones	Recurring

== Awards and nominations ==
Year	Award	Category	Nominated work	Results	Ref
2023	Screen Actors Guild Awards	Outstanding Performance by a Cast in a Motion Picture	American Fiction	Nominated	
2020	Imagen Awards	Best Supporting Actor – Television	Little America	Won	
2010	Independent Spirit Awards	Best Supporting Male	Jack Goes Boating	Nominated	
