= Pajama Party =

Pajama party or pyjama party may refer to:

- A sleepover
- Pajama Party (film), a 1964 film
- Pajama Party (group), a 1980s and 1990s R&B trio
- "Pajama Party" (Pee-wee's Playhouse), an episode of Pee-wee's Playhouse

== See also ==
- Pyjama Party, a Finnish television series
