= Grand (Erin McKeown album) =

Studio album by Erin McKeown
- Released: 2003
- Genre: Rock; folk
- Label: Nettwerk Records

Erin McKeown chronology
Distillation (2000)	Grand (2003)	We Will Become Like Birds (2005)

Professional ratings
Review scores
Source	Rating
AllMusic	3/5 stars

Grand is the third album by Erin McKeown. Released in 2003, it was her first album for Nettwerk Records.

== Track listing ==
1. Slung-Lo
2. Cinematic
3. Taste of You
4. Born to Hum
5. Civilians
6. Envelopes of Glassine
7. How to Be a Lady
8. Better Wife
9. Cosmopolitans
10. Lucky Day
11. Innocent Fiction
12. James!
13. Starlit
14. Vera
