= Water by the Spoonful =

2011 American play

- Original language: English
- Written by: Quiara Alegría Hudes
- Characters: Elliot Ortiz; Yazmin Ortiz; Odessa Ortiz; Fountainhead; Chutes & Ladders; Orangutan; A Ghost
- Series: Elliot Trilogy

Premiere
- Date: October 20, 2011
- Place: Hartford Stage; Hartford, Connecticut

Water by the Spoonful (2011) is an American play by Quiara Alegría Hudes and the second part of the Elliot Trilogy. This play is set seven years after the first section of the trilogy, Elliot, a Soldier's Fugue. Featuring veteran Elliot Ortiz, the play is set in both the virtual and physical worlds of Philadelphia, United States; Japan, and Puerto Rico.

The play won the 2012 Pulitzer Prize for Drama.

== Concept ==
Water by the Spoonful is the second part of Hudes's trilogy that began with Elliot, A Soldier's Fugue. The third part, The Happiest Song Plays Last, was planned to open in 2013 in Chicago.

The first part of the trilogy explored "a young Marine, Elliot Ortiz, coming to terms with his time in Iraq and his father's and grandfather's service in Vietnam and Korea". Water by the Spoonful takes place several years after Elliot, a wounded veteran, has returned to his home in Philadelphia. Ginny, his ailing adoptive mother, dies soon after the play opens. As Elliot and his cousin Yaz attempt to process their loss, Ginny's sister Odessa, Elliot's biological mother, bonds with other recovering addicts on a Narcotics Anonymous support chat room that she moderates.

== Characters ==
- Elliot Ortiz: A twenty-four-year-old Puerto Rican aspiring model and Iraq War vet with a limp. The biological son of Odessa and adopted son of Ginny (who does not appear in the play), he is plagued by hallucinations (PTSD) from his war service.
- Yazmin Ortiz: Elliot's twenty-nine-year-old cousin, niece to Odessa and adjunct professor at Swarthmore College.
- Odessa Ortiz: Elliot's birth mother, thirty-nine, who goes by the alias Haikumom on her Narcotics Anonymous site. She works as a janitor and still lives in poverty.
- Chutes&Ladders: A recovering addict on Haikumom's site. He is Clayton "Buddy" Wilkie, a fifty-six-year-old African-American IRS employee based in San Diego. He develops a close bond with Orangutan, a woman on the website.
- Orangutan: A recovering addict on Haikumom's site. Born Yoshiko Sakai, she was renamed as Madeleine Mays after being adopted as a baby from Japan by white American parents. She travels to Japan in her twenties to discover her identity.
- Fountainhead: An addict on Haikumom's site. John is a white Philadelphia Main Line resident denying his addiction; he is forty-one, and married with children.
- A Ghost: A manifestation of Elliot's first kill, he repeats the line "Can I please have my passport back?" in Arabic. The same actor also plays a Japanese policeman and a colleague of Yazmin at Swarthmore College, Arabic Studies Professor Aman.

== Plot ==
Set seven years after Elliot, A Soldier's Fugue, the play features veteran Elliot Ortiz, who was wounded and has returned to his home town of Philadelphia. He works at a sandwich shop and cares for his ailing aunt Ginny, who raised him. He is coping with recurring bouts of posttraumatic stress disorder (PTSD), characterized by visions of an apparition, a man who continually offers a hand and repeats an Arabic phrase. Elliot's cousin Yazmin, a Swarthmore College music professor in the middle of a divorce, introduces him to Professor Aman, from Swarthmore's Arabic Studies department. Elliot wants to decipher the phrase the ghost repeats, but does not want to share its origin. Aman says that he will translate the phrase if Elliot agrees to contact a filmmaker friend of his who is making a documentary about the Iraq War. When Elliot accepts, Aman reveals that the phrase means, "Can I please have my passport back?".

Odessa is Elliot's birth mother and Ginny's sister. She had given up her son because of her crack addiction. In recovery, she uses the alias Haikumom to moderate an anonymous online message board for recovering addicts. These include Orangutan and Chutes&Ladders. Haikumom and Chutes&Ladders are delighted by the appearance of Orangutan, who has not logged into the site for three months. She tells them that she is 90 days sober and has moved to Japan to meet her birth parents.

Fountainhead, a wealthy Philadelphian addict-in-denial, arrives and sows discord on the message board. Odessa wants to welcome him, but Orangutan and Chutes&Ladders doubt his intentions, especially when he seeks help to avoid telling his wife about his addiction. After Fountainhead and Odessa leave the chatroom, Orangutan encourages Chutes&Ladders to visit her in Japan, but he refuses. He fears that the awkwardness of the meeting and the break from the routine he has built for himself might threaten his 10-year sobriety.

When Ginny dies, Elliot and Yazmin have limited funds to pay for her funeral, and they start seeking money from the rest of the family. While this is happening, Odessa meets Fountainhead at a diner to discuss rehab and treatment options. Yazmin and Elliot arrive and confront Odessa for her failure to contribute to her sister's funeral. Elliot reveals to Fountainhead that Odessa had a daughter who died of dehydration from the flu at the age of two. He blames Odessa, claiming that she was too busy getting high on crack to give his sister the "water by the spoonful" she needed to survive. Shamed, Odessa gives Elliot permission to pawn her personal computer for Ginny's funeral expenses. He and Yazmin go to Odessa's apartment to retrieve it. Elliot logs in and poses as Haikumom on the message board, where he insults Orangutan. Yazmin grabs the keyboard to explain it is Haikumom's son using the computer. Orangutan tells them that Haikumom has always spoken very highly of Elliot on the site. She had regretted her absence from his life due to her addiction.

Orangutan posts that she plans to visit her birth parents' address, but Chutes&Ladders attempts to dissuade her. He suggests that the emotion of the visit might make her want to use again. Orangutan says that she prefers uncertainty about the future to Chutes&Ladders' strict routine, and leaves for the train to Kushiro, where her birth parents supposedly reside. That night, Odessa relapses and the hospital calls Fountainhead, whom she listed as an emergency contact without his knowledge. In the morning, Orangutan reveals that she did not take the train to her birth parents. Chutes&Ladders says that he has decided to face his fears and has bought a ticket to Japan. Fountainhead enters the chat with the news about Odessa, and Chutes&Ladders convinces him that he now has a duty to care for her. Fountainhead agrees and calls his wife, giving her the credentials to his profile on the message board, so that she can find out about his addiction struggles.

Orangutan and Chutes&Ladders meet in person in Japan. Yazmin and Elliot travel to Puerto Rico where they scatter Ginny's ashes. Yazmin plans to purchase Ginny's house there and to start a family. Elliot vows to pursue his acting dream in Los Angeles.

== Productions ==
- The play was commissioned by Hartford Stage as part of Hudes's 2008-2009 Aetna New Voices Fellowship; it debuted at Hartford Stage in October 2011.
- The play premiered off-Broadway at Second Stage Theatre on December 11, 2012 (previews), and ran to February 10, 2013. It was directed by Davis McCallum (who also directed the Hartford Stage production). The cast featured Armando Riesco, Liza Colón-Zayas and Zabryna Guevara.
- Second Stage Theatre on January 27, 2013, hosted a Hudes Elliot Trilogy, where Water by the Spoonful was done in full production and directed by David McCallum.
- The University of Iowa in 2013 produced the play, directed by Tlaloc Rivas at the David Thayer Theatre.
- Arden Theatre Company (Philadelphia) produced the play from January 16 to March 16, 2014, directed by Lucie Tiberghien on the Arcadia stage.
- The Oregon Shakespeare Festival in 2014 began an online streaming service for Water by the Spoonful, running September 1–25. This production was directed by Shishir Kurup. The cast featured Daniel Molina, Vilma Silva, and Nancy Rodriguez.
- In 2015, Theatre Twenty-Two in Seattle produced the play, directed by Julie Beckman, from October 23-November 14.
- In 2016, the Curious Theatre Company put on this production directed by Chip Walton from September 3 to October 15. The cast included Thony Mena, GerRee Hinshaw and Gabriella Cavellero.
- Center Theatre Group from January 31 to March 11, 2018 ran this production directed by Lileana Blain-Cruz.
- In 2019, Indiana University Bloomington at Wells-Metz Theatre put on this production from November 8 to 16 which was directed by Rachel Nicole Pierce.
- Teatro Paraguas, Ironweed Productions, and Santa Fe Playhouse in 2019 put on the Elliot Trilogy, including Water by the Spoonful, directed by Valli Marie Rivera.
- In 2024, Firehouse Theatre produced the Virginia premiere of the play from November 6 to November 24, directed by Katrinah Carol Lewis.

== Critical response ==
- Pulitzer.org describes the play as "...an imaginative play about the search for meaning by a returning Iraq War veteran working in a sandwich shop in his hometown of Philadelphia." The Boston Globe describes it as a story of "...an Iraq war veteran struggling to find his place in the world..."
- David Ng of The Los Angeles Times says the play "follows an Iraq war veteran who is struggling with civilian life. His story runs in parallel with those of four individuals who connect on an online chatroom dedicated to recovering drug addicts."
- Erik Piepenburg of The New York Times describes the subject of the play as "..a Puerto Rican veteran of the Iraq war who faces personal demons when he returns to the United States".
- Charles McNulty, a theater critic with the LA Times, describes the play, "Water by the Spoonful," Quiara Alegría Hudes' Pulitzer Prize winner, is a family drama that redefines what family means for those struggling not to fall through the cracks of an increasingly fractured society.
- Chris Jones, the chief theatre critic for the Chicago Tribune, says, "This play somehow drives to a quieter yet deeper depth, offering the wholly fulfilling sense that everyone on the stage is, by their creator, known."
- Peter Marks, a theatre critic with the Washington Post, wrote, "It's a sensitively wrought piece, with an ambitious range of concerns and some interesting observations about the families we're born into and the ones we create in a modern age, in therapeutic situations, and even online."

The play was published in 2012 by Theatre Communications Group.
