= We Will Become Like Birds =

Studio album by Erin McKeown
- Released: 2005
- Genre: rock music/folk music
- Label: Nettwerk Records

Erin McKeown chronology
Grand (2003)	We Will Become Like Birds (2005)	Sing You Sinners (2006)

Professional ratings
Review scores
Source	Rating
Allmusic	4.5/5 stars

We Will Become Like Birds is the fourth album by Erin McKeown. It was released via Nettwerk Records in 2005, and features contributions from Juana Molina and Peter Mulvey.

== Track listing ==
1. Aspera
2. Air
3. Life On the Moon
4. To The Stars
5. Beautiful (I Guess)
6. Float
7. We Are More
8. White City
9. The Golden Dream (with Juana Molina)
10. Bells and Bombs
11. Delicate December (with Peter Mulvey)
12. You Were Right About Everything
13. A Certain Pleasure (Bonus Track)
