= Candida Donadio =

American literary agent

- Born: October 22, 1929; Brooklyn, New York City, U.S.
- Died: January 20, 2001 (aged 71); Stonington, Connecticut, U.S.
- Occupation: Literary agent
- Years active: 1957-1995

Candida Donadio (October 22, 1929 – January 20, 2001) was an American literary agent known for representing many authors affiliated with post-modernism and shaping American experimental literature to come particularly through her work with Thomas Pynchon and Joseph Heller.

Donadio was referred to in the mid-1960s as part of what Esquire called the "red-hot center" of contemporary literature, after shepherding books such as Joseph Heller's Catch-22 (1961), Jessica Mitford's The American Way of Death (1963), and Thomas Pynchon's V. (1963) through successful publishing campaigns.

Over her career Donadio represented many writers, including Pynchon, Heller, Mitford, Mario Puzo, John Cheever, Philip Roth, Cormac McCarthy, Bruce Jay Friedman, Robert Stone, Michael Herr, William Gaddis and Bernard Malamud.

== Early life ==
Donadio was born on October 22, 1929, in Brooklyn, New York City. Her parents were immigrants from Sicily.

== Career ==
In 1953, Donadio worked as a girl Friday at McIntosh & McKee, when Joseph Heller submitted a very early version of Catch-22. Heller later wrote in 1994 that Donadio's superiors had no interest in the book, finding it "incomprehensible," but Donadio took initiative to submit the chapter to periodicals. After some time, Donadio convinced the literary magazine New World Writing to accept the first chapter, which increased Heller's confidence in the work.

By 1957, Donadio secured offers from both Simon & Schuster and Viking Press based on an early completely unfinished draft. Donadio and Heller decided to go with Simon & Schuster, in part due to the enthusiasm of then-editorial assistant Robert Gottlieb. Donadio moved to Herb Jaffe's agency as the firm expanded beyond representing playwrights and actors, with Donadio becoming one of its key literary representatives. The novel was initially called Catch 18, and it was changed to avoid confusion with Leon Uris's Mila 18. In interviews, Donadio claimed that the number was changed to her birthday as a gesture, though Robert Gottlieb rejected that narrative entirely as "lying" in his 2016 autobiography. He claims that the title change developed from him, as he felt that "22" was much funnier than "18."

Donadio began to represent Philip Roth in 1958. She helped negotiate the sale of his first book, Goodbye, Columbus to Houghton Mifflin, boosting the publisher's advance offer from $1,000 to $2,500 by leveraging a counteroffer from Viking Press. The debut won the National Book Award for Fiction in 1960. Donadio served as Roth's agent from 1958 until 1972. While representing him, she notably negotiated large publishing and film rights contracts for Portnoy's Complaint. In a 1972 letter after firing her as his agent, Roth wrote that "unlike Portnoy, I have no complaints," though biographer Blake Bailey speculates that her "very mothering" style and Roth's "general aloofness" had worn on the relationship.

After Jaffe sold his agency in 1961, Donadio moved to Russell & Volkening, where she worked until 1968. She founded her own namesake literary agency in the 1970s, which later bore the name of agents such as Eric Ashworth and Neil Olson.

Donadio's namesake agency ran for more than 20 years after her retirement and 17 years after her death, when it finally filed for bankruptcy in 2018. The company's bookkeeper of 20 years, Darin Webb, was sentenced to two years in prison later that same month, for embezzling 3.4 million dollars from the agency.

In 1984, Donadio sold 120 letters written by Pynchon to herself between 1962 and 1983 to Carter Burden for $45,000. When this came to public attention in 1998 it became the subject of some controversy.

Donadio resided in Stonington, Connecticut. She was diagnosed with cancer in 1995, and she died on January 20, 2001.

== Personal life ==
Donadio was married twice, to critic H. E. F. Donahue and to writer Henry Bloomstein. Both marriages ended in divorce.

== Legacy ==
Laura B. McGrath, author of Middlemen: Literary Agents and the Making of American Fiction, posits agents as the "most consequential gatekeepers" in contemporary publishing and says in her book that "much of the literature we now associate with high postmodernism was published as a result of Donadio’s taste and tenacity".

Donadio was portrayed by Lola Glaudini in the 2022 show The Offer detailing the development and production of Francis Ford Coppola's 1972 film The Godfather based on the novel by Donadio's client Mario Puzo.
