= Erin McKeown =

American musician (born 1977)

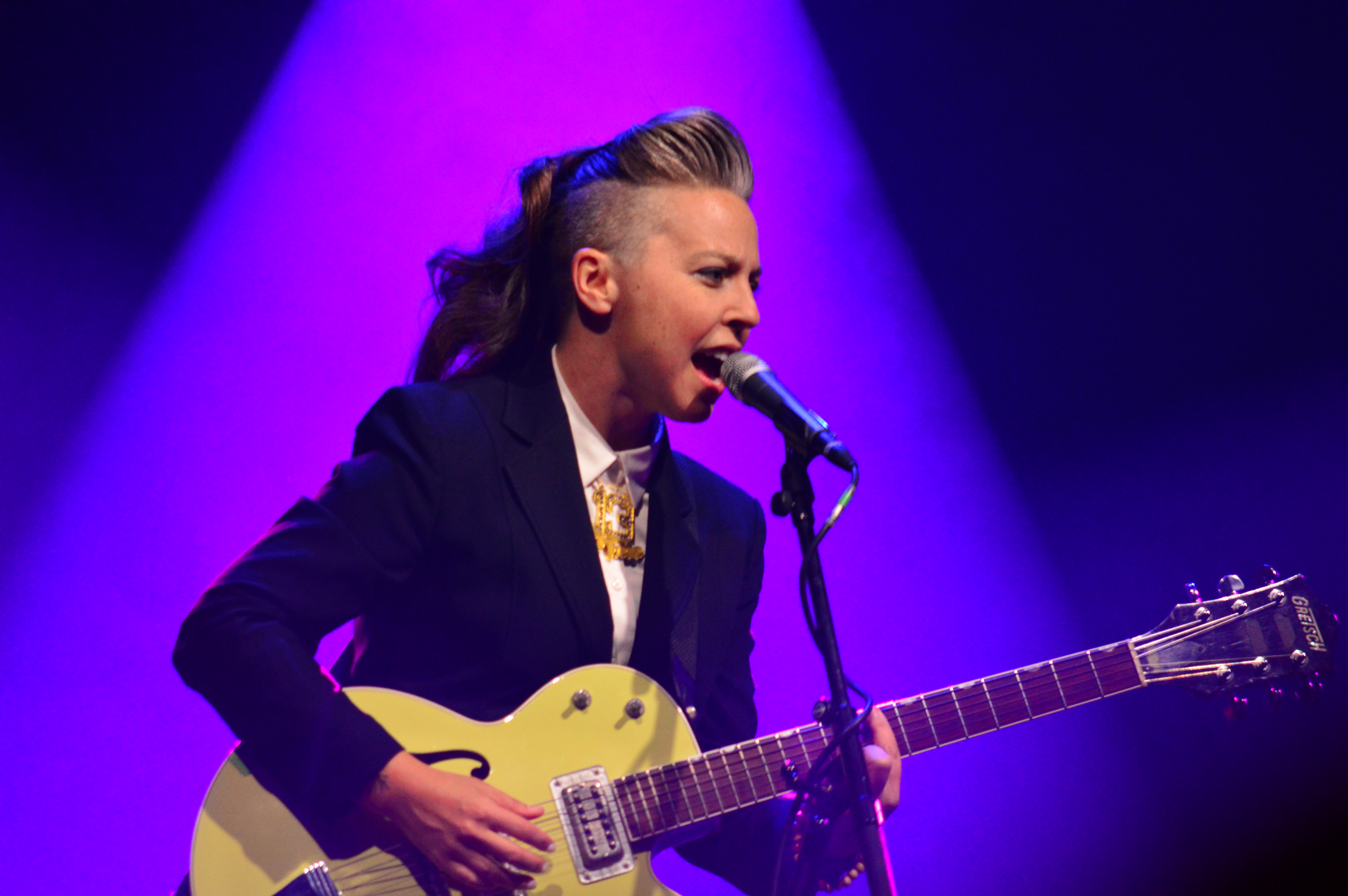
- McKeown in Helsinki, 2017

Background information
- Born: October 15, 1977 (age 48); Fredericksburg, Virginia, U.S.
- Genres: Alternative rock; indie rock; indie pop; folk; jazz
- Occupation: Singer-songwriter
- Labels: TVP; Nettwerk; Righteous Babe; Signature Sounds
- Website: www.erinmckeown.com

Erin McKeown (pronounced /məˈkjoʊn/ mə-KYOHN) is an American multi-instrumentalist and folk-rock singer-songwriter. McKeown's music encompasses pop, swing, rock, folk, and electronic music, as well as several other genres.

== Music career ==
They grew up in Fredericksburg, Virginia, and now live in Massachusetts. McKeown began their career in the folk scene. In college at Brown University, they were in a band known as Lloyd (pronounced LUH-LOID). They released their first album, Monday Morning Cold in 1999 on their own label (TVP Records), travelling throughout New England while a student at Brown University in order to promote the record. Although they had begun studying ornithology, they graduated from Brown with a degree in ethnomusicology. Early in their career, they collaborated with Beth Amsel, Jess Klein, and Rose Polenzani; the four of them performed as Voices on the Verge.

McKeown's 2005 album, We Will Become Like Birds (produced by Tucker Martine), served as a departure from their earlier work, with a more rock-oriented sound. At a September 1, 2008, concert at The Gravity Lounge in Charlottesville, Virginia, McKeown told the audience that they wrote this album "in an attempt to write myself out of the worst heartache I'd experienced up to that point." Their next studio release, Sing You Sinners, was released in Europe on the 23 October 2006 and in the United States on January 9, 2007 by Nettwerk. It consists mostly of covers of jazz standards from the 1920s through 1950s.

McKeown's record, Hundreds of Lions, was released under Righteous Babe Records on October 13, 2009. McKeown is currently member of an unsigned band known as "emma", which they created with their friend Allison Miller. McKeown has plans to write a book of poetry. McKeown released "Manifestra" on January 15, 2013. Physical copies also came with a bonus album, "Civics", where they performed the entirety of "Manifestra" solo acoustic in an historic library.

McKeown performs regularly, spending much of their time touring throughout the world with artists such as Ani DiFranco, Josh Ritter, the Indigo Girls, Martin Sexton, Andrew Bird, Thea Gilmore, Melissa Ferrick, Allison Miller, Welcome to Night Vale, and others. McKeown also took part in Queerstock, a music festival dedicated to promoting LGBT musicians. McKeown is noted for their energetic stage presence and their habit of wearing tailored suits, often with ties and Fluevog shoes, to performances.

They occasionally perform big band music with the Beantown Swing Orchestra.

McKeown was selected to be a 2011–2012 fellow at Harvard University's Berkman Center for Internet & Society. There, they will "work to connect the worlds of policy, art, and technology while considering questions about how to make a creative life a viable vocation."

In October 2016, a new musical McKeown wrote with the playwright Quiara Alegría Hudes titled Miss You Like Hell opened at the La Jolla Playhouse directed by Lear deBessonet and starring Daphne Rubin-Vega. The show opened Off-Broadway, April 20, 2018 at the Public Theater. A cast recording of the project was released October 5, 2018 on Ghostlight Records.

== Personal life ==
McKeown is non-binary.

== Discography ==
- Monday Morning Cold (TVP) (1999)
- Distillation (Signature Sounds) (October 10, 2000)
- Grand (Nettwerk) (June 10, 2003)
- We Will Become Like Birds (Nettwerk) (June 28, 2005)
- Sing You Sinners (Nettwerk) (January 9, 2007)
- Lafayette (Live) (Signature Sounds) (September 25, 2007)
- Small Deviant Things, vol. 1 (TVP) (August 1, 2008)
- Hundreds of Lions (Righteous Babe) (October 13, 2009)
- 3 Songs feat. Marc Dalio and Matt Douglas (TVP) (December 7, 2010)
- F*ck That! Erin McKeown's Anti-Holiday Album (TVP) (November 1, 2011)
- MANIFESTRA (TVP) (January 15, 2013)
- Small Deviant Things, vol. 2 + 3 (TVP) (November 6, 2013)
- According to Us (TVP) (June 24, 2016)
- Mirrors Break Back (TVP) (March 31, 2017)
- Miss You Like Hell (Original Cast Recording) (Ghostlight Records) (October 5, 2018)
- KISS OFF KISS (TVP) (September 24, 2021)
- F*CK U TOO! More Anti-Holiday Songs from Erin McKeown (TVP) (November 1, 2024)
