= Beth Amsel =

American folk singer-songwriter

Beth Amsel is an American folk singer-songwriter. She grew up on Long Island and moved to Colorado at the age of thirteen. In 1997, she moved to the East Coast and joined the New England folk scene. In 1998, a reviewer described her as having a "voice that seemed destined for something big .... a pure voice that flitted easily from Joni Mitchell soprano to duskier Dar Williams." Another reviewer in 2004 wrote, "Beth Amsel possesses one of the genre's finest voices. She's also a top-notch songwriter". She has performed with The Weepies, Jess Klein, Erin McKeown and Rose Polenzani as Voices on the Verge.

Amsel moved to San Francisco in 2013, where she lives with her husband.

== Discography ==
- A Thousand Miles (1997)
- Live in Philadelphia (Voices on the Verge) (2001)
- Kindling (2002)
- The Reverie (2005)
