= Elliot, A Soldier's Fugue =

2006 play by Quiara Alegria Hudes

- Written by: Quiara Alegria Hudes

Premiere
- Date premiered: January 28, 2006
- Place premiered: Page 73 Productions at The Culture Project

Elliot, a Soldier's Fugue is a 2006 American play by Quiara Alegria Hudes. The show centers Elliot, a nineteen-year-old Iraq War veteran, intertwined with the stories of his father and grandfather, veterans of the Vietnam War and Korean War. The play was a finalist for the 2007 Pulitzer Prize for Drama.

== Production history ==
=== Page 73 Productions at The Culture Project, NYC (2006) ===
Elliot, a Soldier's Fugue premiered at Page 73 Productions in New York at The Culture Project on January 28, 2006. The production was directed by Davis McCallum.

== Reception ==
The show has received positive reviews. Phoebe Hoban described its premiere production as a "deeply poetic, touching and often funny indictment of the war in Iraq" in The New York Times, with more recent regional productions also receiving praise.
