= Voices on the Verge =

American folk, country, and rock band

Voices on the Verge was an American folk, country, and rock band formed as a collaboration between four young, formerly-independent, female musicians: Jess Klein, Erin McKeown, Rose Polenzani, and Beth Amsel.

The group formed in 1998 as a way to show the merits of each artist. They mostly played songs that one of the artists had previously written and recorded separately. The four artists were able to add harmonies and dynamics not present on individual recordings of their songs.

Their music was often compared to Ani DiFranco or Dar Williams. The group no longer plays together as a group, but as of 2005, all four artists are still recording and performing separately. Their only CD, Live in Philadelphia, was released on October 2, 2001 on the Rykodisc label.
