= Jack Goes Boating (play) =

Play written by Robert Glaudini

Jack Goes Boating is a 2007 play by Robert Glaudini. It is an unconventional romantic comedy set in the midst of working-class New York City life.

== Production ==
Jack Goes Boating premiered Off-Broadway in a Labyrinth Theater Company production on March 18, 2007, at Martinson Hall at the Joseph Papp Public Theater. Directed by Peter Dubois, the cast starred Philip Seymour Hoffman as Jack, John Ortiz as Clyde, Daphne Rubin-Vega as Lucy, and Beth Cole as Connie.

The show received positive reviews, particularly from The New York Times. Ben Brantley called it an "immensely likable play".
