= Pride and Glory =

Pride and Glory may refer to:

- Pride & Glory (band), an American rock band formed by Zakk Wylde in the early 1990s
  - Pride & Glory (album), the band's self-titled debut album
- Pride and Glory (film), a police drama directed by Gavin O'Connor, starring Edward Norton and Colin Farrell
