= Sing You Sinners (album) =

Studio album by Erin McKeown
- Released: 2006
- Genre: rock music/folk music
- Label: Nettwerk Records

Erin McKeown chronology
We Will Become Like Birds (2005)	Sing You Sinners (2006)

Professional ratings
Review scores
Source	Rating
Allmusic	4.5/5 stars

Sing You Sinners is the seventh album by Erin McKeown since they began their career in 1997, and their fourth studio album in six years. Released in 2006 via Nettwerk Records, it is an album of a variety of American standards, with one original composition, "Melody".

The album features Sam Kassirer on the piano, organ, and wurlitzer; Todd Sickafoose on the bass; and drummer Allison Miller. McKeown plays an array of banjos and guitars, as well as vocals.

== Track listing ==
1. Get Happy
2. Paper Moon
3. Coucou
4. Melody
5. They Say It's Spring
6. I Was a Little Too Lonely (You Were a Little Too Late)
7. Sing You Sinners
8. Rhode Island is Famous for You
9. Something's Gotta Give
10. Just One of Those Things
11. If You a Viper
12. Thanks for the Boogie Ride
13. Don't Worry 'bout Me
