= Up All Night (Pajama Party album) =

Studio album by Pajama Party
- Released: October 23, 1989
- Genre: Latin freestyle, R&B
- Length: 49:53
- Label: Atlantic
- Producer: Jim Klein

Pajama Party chronology
Up All Night (1989)	Can't Live Without It (1991)

Singles from Up All Night
- 1. "Yo No Sé" Released: 1988; 2. "Over and Over" Released: 1989; 3. "Hide and Seek" Released: 1990

Professional ratings
Review scores
Source	Rating
Warr.org	link

Up All Night is the first full-length album by Pajama Party, an American R&B/Dance/Pop female vocal trio from Brooklyn, New York. The album was released on October 23, 1989, by Atlantic Records.

== Track listing ==
No.	Title	Length
1.	"Over and Over"	6:05
2.	"Hide and Seek"	4:14
3.	"Lovelight"	4:10
4.	"Living Inside Your Love"	4:56
5.	"Yo No Sé"	5:41
6.	"Surfing in Babylon"	4:41
7.	"Bringing All Your Love to Me"	4:17
8.	"Loving You"	4:47

CD Edition

No.	Title	Length
9.	"Over and Over" (B.F.E. Mix)	5:36
10.	"Yo No Sé" (B.F.E./23 West Mix)	5:23

== Charts ==
Singles - Billboard (North America)

Year	Single	Chart	Position
1988/1989	"Yo No Sé"	Hot Dance Music/Club Play	34
1988/1989	"Yo No Sé"	Hot Dance Music/Maxi-Singles Sales	17
1988/1989	"Yo No Sé"	The Billboard Hot 100	75
1988/1989	"Over and Over"	Hot Dance Music/Club Play	26
1988/1989	"Over and Over"	Hot Dance Music/Maxi-Singles Sales	4
1988/1989	"Over and Over"	The Billboard Hot 100	59
1990	"Hide and Seek"	Hot Dance Music/Club Play	33
1990	"Hide and Seek"	Hot Dance Music/Maxi-Singles Sales	17
1990	"Hide and Seek"	The Billboard Hot 100	73
