= Pajama Party (group) =

US girl group

- Origin: Brooklyn
- Genres: Freestyle
- Years active: 1988–1992
- Label: Atlantic
- Past members: Daphne Rubin-Vega; Lynn Critelli; Amanda Homi; Jennifer McQuilkin; Suzi Ranta; Marialisa Costanzo; Janine Acquafredda; Rhoville Evaristo

Pajama Party was an American female vocal trio from Brooklyn, New York active between 1988 and 1992. The original members were Jennifer McQuilkin of New Jersey, Daphne Rubin-Vega of Panama, and Suzi Ranta of Michigan with songwriter Peggy Sendars and songwriter/producer Jim Klein.

== Career ==
The group originally consisted of Daphne Rubin-Vega, Jennifer McQuilkin, and Suzi Ranta, with Jennifer singing lead, but McQuilkin and Ranta were replaced in 1989 by Lynn Critelli and Amanda Homi.

The band's biggest hit single, "Yo No Sé" (1988) (sung by Jennifer McQuilkin), was one of the first freestyle songs in which the title was entirely in the Spanish language, which peaked at #75 on the Billboard Hot 100 chart. Their second single "Over and Over" (originally performed by Brenda K. Starr) peaked at 59 on the Hot 100.

=== First album ===
In 1988, the band recorded its first full-length album Up All Night on Atlantic Records. In 1989, Homi was replaced by Club MTV dancer Marialisa Costanzo. The next single, "Hide and Seek" (1990) (remixed by Robert Clivillés and David Cole) became their first music video. "Hide and Seek" went to 73 on the Hot 100.

The debut album contained the song "Lovelight" as well as the ballad "Living Inside Your Love". The singles charted on the Billboard Hot Dance Club Songs, and the group toured with New Kids on The Block, George Lamond, Sweet Sensation, Brenda K. Starr, Linear, and Sa-Fire.

=== Second album ===
In 1991 came the release of their second album Can't Live Without It (also on Atlantic). The first single was "Got My Eye on You". The album's title song leaned towards R&B and pop.

== Moving forward ==
By 1992, the group broke up, but members still continued to be involved in the entertainment industry. Rubin-Vega became a successful solo dance music artist (now with her Rock band DRV), and has done some movies, as well as originating the role of 'Mimi' in the Broadway musical Rent. McQuilkin, Ranta, and Critelli are all still in the music business. Homi and Costanzo are pursuing acting careers.

In 2000, for a celebration held in honor of Fever Records's Sal Abbatiello, a new version of Pajama Party graced the stage. Costanzo, along with new members Janine Acquafredda (a former backup singer for Lisette Melendez) and Johanna (formerly Freestyle artist Lil' Johanna) performed some of the classics, as well as new material.

== Discography ==
Year	Album details
1989	Up All Night Released: October 23, 1989: Label: Atlantic; Formats: CS, CD, LP
1991	Can't Live Without It: Released: March 19, 1991; Label: Atlantic; Formats: CD

== Singles ==
Year	Single	Positions			Album
Year	Single	Billboard Hot 100	Hot Dance Music/Club Play	Hot Dance Music/Maxi-Singles Sales	Album
1989	"Yo No Sé"	75	34	17	Up All Night
1989	"Over and Over"	59	26	4	Up All Night
1990	"Hide and Seek"	73	33	17	Up All Night
1990	"Living Inside Your Love"	-	-	-	Up All Night
1991	"Got My Eye On You"	-	-	-	Can't Live Without It
"-" denotes a release that did not make the stop.
