= Quiara Alegría Hudes =

American playwright and composer (born 1977)

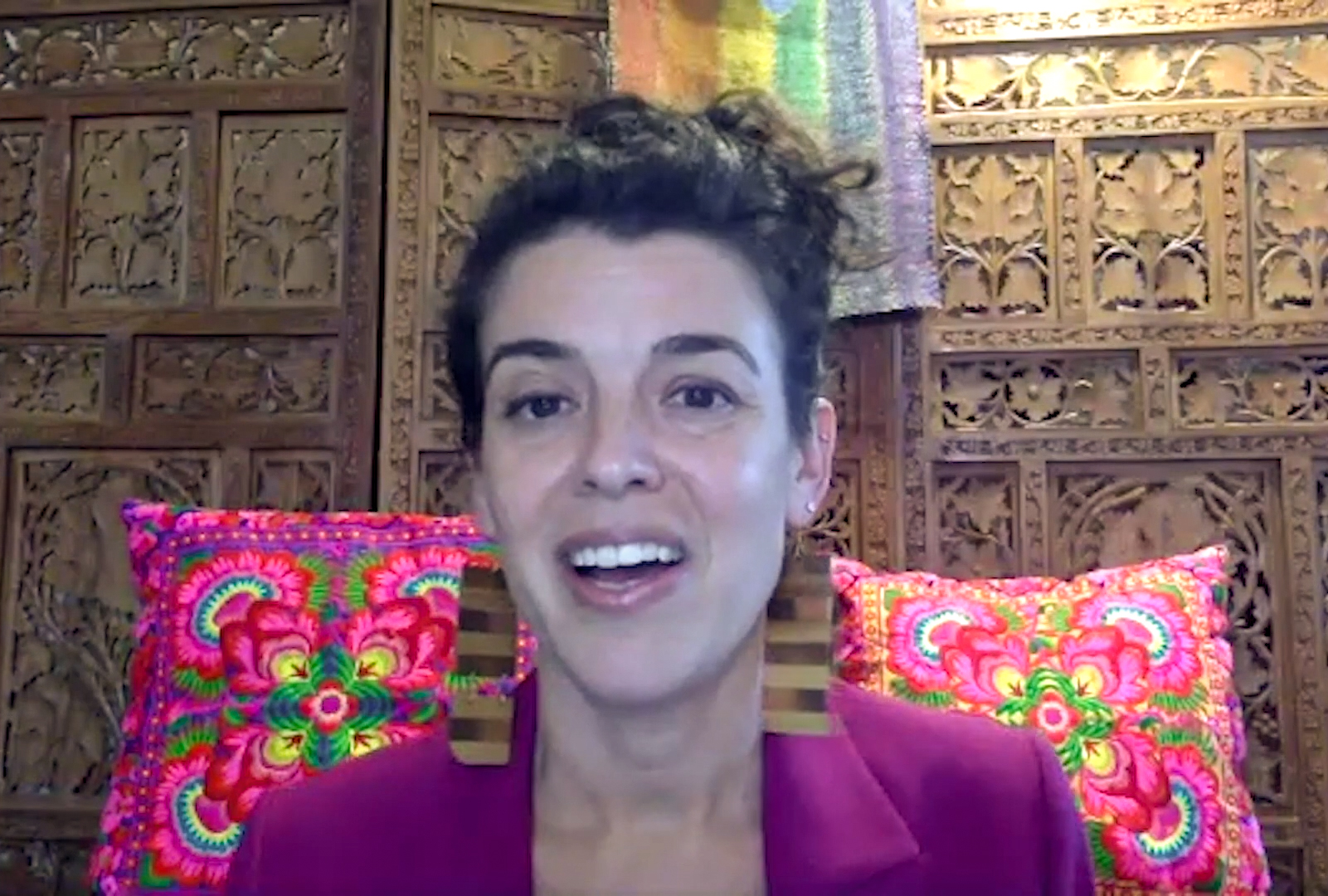
- Hudes in 2021
- Born: September 22, 1977 (age 49); Philadelphia, Pennsylvania, U.S.
- Education: Yale University (BA); Brown University (MFA)
- Children: 2
- Writing career
- Years active: 2003–present
- Notable work: In the Heights
- Notable awards: Pulitzer Prize for Drama; 2012 Water by the Spoonful
- Website: www.quiara.com

Quiara Alegría Hudes (born September 22, 1977) is an American playwright, producer, lyricist and essayist. She is best known for writing the book for the musical In the Heights (2007), and screenplay for its film adaptation. Hudes' first play in her Elliot Trilogy, Elliot, a Soldier's Fugue was a finalist for the 2007 Pulitzer Prize for Drama. She received the 2012 Pulitzer Prize for Drama for Water by the Spoonful, her second play in that trilogy.

== Early life and education ==
Hudes was born in 1977 in Philadelphia, Pennsylvania, to a Jewish father and a Puerto Rican mother. They raised her in West Philadelphia, where she began writing and composing music as a child. She studied at the Mary Louise Curtis Branch of Settlement Music School, taking piano lessons with Dolly Krasnopolsky. Hudes has said that, although she is of "Puerto Rican and Jewish blood", she was "raised by two Puerto Rican parents." Her birth parents separated and her step-father was a Puerto Rican entrepreneur.

Hudes graduated from Central High School in Philadelphia, and then studied music composition at Yale University as a first generation college student, where she earned her BA degree in 1999. She subsequently completed graduate work at Brown University, where she received an MFA in playwriting in 2004. She is a resident writer at New Dramatists and a previous Page 73 Playwriting Fellow.

In 2012, Hudes was a visiting playwright at Wesleyan University in Middletown, Connecticut. She returned in 2014, serving as the Shapiro Distinguished Professor of Writing and Theater until 2017.

== Career ==
The original Off-Broadway production of In the Heights received the Lucille Lortel Award and Outer Critics Circle Award for Best Musical. It was named Best Musical by New York magazine, Best of 2007 by The New York Times, and the Hispanic Organization of Latin Actors HOLA Award for Outstanding Achievement in Playwriting.

In 2010, she was named a Fellow by United States Artists. Hudes's first children's book, In My Neighborhood, was published by Arthur Levine Books, an imprint of Scholastic Inc, in 2010.

On October 27, 2011, Hudes was the first Latina woman to be inducted into Central High School's Alumni Hall of Fame. In October 2016, a new musical she wrote along with singer/songwriter Erin McKeown titled Miss You Like Hell opened at the La Jolla Playhouse, directed by Lear deBessonet and starring Daphne Rubin-Vega.

=== Plays and musicals ===
==== Yemaya's Belly ====
Hudes' first play, Yemaya's Belly, received the 2003 Clauder Competition for New England Playwriting, the Paula Vogel Award in Playwriting, and the Kennedy Center/ACTF Latina Playwriting Award. It had productions at Miracle Theatre (2004), and the Portland Stage Company (2005) and Signature Theatre (2005).

==== Elliot, a Soldier's Fugue ====
Elliot, a Soldier's Fugue was a Pulitzer Prize finalist in 2007. The play premiered at Page 73 Productions at the Off-Broadway Culture Project in 2006, and ran at the Alliance Theatre, Atlanta, Georgia in 2006. The New York Times reviewer wrote that the play was a "rare and rewarding thing: a theater work that succeeds on every level, while creating something new." It was planned as the first play in a trilogy.

==== 26 Miles ====
Her play 26 Miles received its world premiere at The Alliance Theatre in Atlanta in March 2009, directed by Kent Gash.

==== Barrio Grrrrl! ====
Her children's musical Barrio Grrrrl! appeared at The Kennedy Center in 2009.

==== In the Heights ====
Hudes collaborated with Lin-Manuel Miranda on this Broadway musical; she wrote the book and he composed the music and lyrics. It won the 2008 Tony Award for Best Musical and was a finalist for the 2009 Pulitzer Prize for Drama. Hudes also wrote the screenplay for the film adaptation of the same title, which premiered in 2021.

==== Water by the Spoonful ====
In 2012, her play Water by the Spoonful, which returns to the characters in Elliot, won the Pulitzer Prize after its premiere at the Hartford Stage Company. In this play Hudes attempts to bring two worlds together through technology and reality. Water by the Spoonful consists of multiple scenes that take place in an online chat room and in the real world with face-to-face interaction. As the play develops, Hudes brings the two worlds together by creating turning points in the play along with connecting characters from different worlds to each other in different ways.

==== The Happiest Song Plays Last ====
The Happiest Song Plays Last, the third in the Elliot trilogy, received its world premiere at the Goodman Theater in Chicago on April 13, 2013. It was produced Off-Broadway at Second Stage in March 2014. When the production moved to Second Stage Theatre, the production team included Ruben Santiago-Hudson as director, Michael Carnahan as set designer, Karen Perry as costume designer, Rui Rita as lighting designer, and Leon Rothenberg as sound designer.

==== Lulu's Golden Shoes ====
Lulu's Golden Shoes was produced by Flashpoint Theater Company in Philadelphia in 2015.

==== The Good Peaches ====
Originally performed by 56 orchestral musicians, three actors, and eight dancers, The Good Peaches is a "girl versus nature musical play." It was performed in April 2016 at the Cleveland Play House.

==== Daphne's Dive ====
Daphne’s Dive premiered Off-Broadway at the Signature Theater on May 16, 2016, directed by Thomas Kail and featuring Samira Wiley, Daphne Rubin-Vega, Vanessa Aspillaga and Carlos Gomez.

==== Miss You Like Hell ====
Hudes wrote the book and Erin McKeown the music for the musical, Miss You Like Hell, which premiered at La Jolla Playhouse in fall of 2016. Called "An immigration musical for the new Trump era" by the LA Times, the play is about a mother and daughter traveling across the country for seven days and addressing their fractured relationship.

==== Vivo ====
Hudes was the screenwriter for Lin-Manuel Miranda's animated musical movie Vivo, released on Netflix on August 6, 2021.

== Filmography ==
Year	Title	Writer	Producer	Notes
2021	In the Heights	Yes	Yes	Based on the musical book by her and Lin-Manuel Miranda; also cameos in "Finale"
2021	Vivo	Yes	No	

== Bibliography ==
- My Broken Language: A Memoir (2021)
- The White Hot (2025)

== Awards and nominations ==
Year	Award	Category	Work	Result	Ref.
2007	Pulitzer Prize for Drama		Elliot, a Soldier's Fugue	Nominated	
2007	Outer Critics Circle Award	Outstanding New Off-Broadway Musical	In the Heights	Nominated	
2008	Tony Award	Best Book of a Musical	In the Heights	Nominated	
2009	Pulitzer Prize for Drama		In the Heights	Nominated	
2012	Pulitzer Prize for Drama		Water by the Spoonful	Won	
2018	Drama Desk Award	Outstanding Lyrics	Miss You Like Hell	Nominated	
2018	Outer Critics Circle Awards	Outstanding Book of a Musical	Miss You Like Hell	Nominated	
2018	Outer Critics Circle Awards	Outstanding New Score	Miss You Like Hell	Nominated	
2026	PEN/Faulkner Award	Fiction	The White Hot	Finalist	
2026	Carol Shields Prize for Fiction	Fiction	The White Hot	Finalist	

== See also ==
- List of Afro-Latinos
- List of Puerto Rican writers
- List of Puerto Ricans
- Puerto Rican literature
- Jewish immigration to Puerto Rico
- Latino theater in the United States
