= Rose Polenzani =

American singer-songwriter

Rose Polenzani (born March 7, 1975, in Waukesha, Wisconsin) is an American folk musician. She was raised in the Chicago area and attended Knox College before leaving to pursue a singing career. She is currently living in Boston, Massachusetts. She plays guitar and, less frequently, piano. Her lyrics often blend obscure images and emotions.

Polenzani has performed in Lilith Fair in 1998, and the Sundance Film Festival in 1999. She has opened for the Indigo Girls, David Gray, Vic Chesnutt, Patty Griffin, Joan Baez, Jonatha Brooke, Kristin Hersh and Shawn Colvin. She has been reviewed positively in the Utne Reader, BUST Magazine, and the Boston Globe.

Polenzani performed as part of Voices on the Verge, a collaborative musical project with Beth Amsel, Jess Klein, and Erin McKeown. Voices on the Verge toured together in 2001 and 2002 and released a live album, Voices on the Verge: Live In Philadelphia on the Rykodisc label. In 2004, Polenzani toured with Sharon Lewis of the British band Pooka, whom she cites as a major musical influence.

Opera singer Matthew Polenzani is her brother. Her grandfather was Lynn Hauldren, known as "The Empire Man" for his work as a pitchman for Empire Today.

== Discography ==
=== Albums ===
- Dragersville, self-released in the summer of 1998.
- Anybody, released July 20, 1999 from Daemon Records.
- Rose Polenzani, released June 5, 2001 from Daemon Records.
- August, self-released on October 6, 2004.
- When the River Meets the Sea, self-released October 1, 2008 (with Session Americana).
- The Rabbit, self-released on August 23, 2011.

=== Compilation appearances ===
- "Ellen West" with Sharon Lewis on Hot Hands: A Tribute to Throwing Muses & Kristin Hersh (Kuma-chan Records, 2003)

== Trivia ==
- During her "Distillation 20th Anniversary" concert, Erin McKeown revealed that her song "Didn't They" referred to a crush on Polenzani.
