= Robert Glaudini =

American actor, writer, director (born 1941)

- Born: December 6, 1941 (age 84); New Orleans, Louisiana, U.S.
- Other name: Bob Glaudini
- Occupations: Actor, playwright, film director
- Years active: 1971–present
- Children: 3, including Lola

Robert Glaudini (born December 6, 1941) is an American actor, playwright, director, and teacher.

== Career ==
He wrote a hit off-Broadway play Jack Goes Boating which was directed by Peter DuBois and starred Philip Seymour Hoffman, John Ortiz, Daphne Rubin-Vega and Beth Cole. Press for the play was extremely positive, leading to a movie directed by Hoffman that was released in September 2010. Glaudini's play Vengeance is the Lord's premiered in Boston at the Huntington Theatre Company in November 2010.

== Personal life ==
Glaudini resides in New York City. He has three daughters, Kathleen, Isabella, and Lola Glaudini.

== Plays ==
- Cowboy Mouth (1971)
- Vengeance is the Lord's
- Jack Goes Boating
- A View from 151st Street
- The Claiming Race
- The Poison Tree
- Sickness of Youth
- The Identical Same Temptation
- Dutch Heart of Man

== Filmography ==
- Mortadella (1972) as Georgie (uncredited)
- Angel City by Jon Jost (1976)
- Chameleon (1978) as Chameleon
- Parasite (1982) as Dr. Paul Dean
- Wavelength (1983) as Dr. Wolf
- The Alchemist (1983) as DelGatto
- Grunt! the Wrestling Movie (1985) as Dr. Tweed
- Mississippi Burning (1988) as Agent Nash
- Cutting Class (1989) as Shultz
- Homer and Eddie (1989) as Robber #2
- Bugsy (1991) as Dominic
- It's Nothing Personal (1993, TV Movie)
- NYPD Blue (1999, TV Series) as Jimmy Mayo
- The Princess Diaries (2001) as Consulate Valet Adolpho
- Coastlines (2002) as Henry
