= Lola Glaudini =

American actress (born 1971)

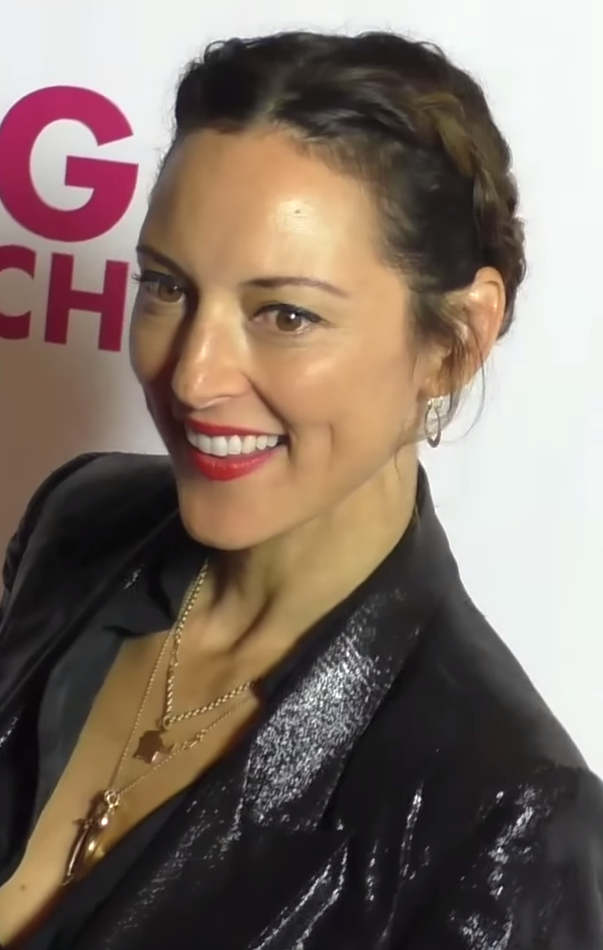
- Glaudini in 2016
- Born: November 24, 1971 (age 54)
- Occupation: Actress
- Years active: 1996–2022
- Spouse: Stuart England (m. 2005)
- Children: 2

Lola Glaudini (born November 24, 1971) is an American actress. She played Elle Greenaway on CBS's Criminal Minds and Deborah Ciccerone-Waldrup on HBO's The Sopranos.

== Early life ==
Glaudini is of Italian descent. She is the daughter of Robert Glaudini.

== Career ==
In 2001, Glaudini had a small role as Rada in the Ted Demme film Blow. She later claimed in a podcast that star Johnny Depp had been verbally abusive to her when she interrupted him at the director's suggestion. Between 2001 and 2004, Glaudini had a recurring role on the HBO series The Sopranos as Federal Agent Deborah Ciccerone-Waldrup. In 2005 she was a regular on the CBS series Criminal Minds as Elle Greenaway, but left Hollywood and the show early in the second season to do theater work back on the east coast. Before those roles she appeared on NYPD Blue as Dolores Mayo, a heroin-addicted office assistant. She has guest starred in The Good Guys, The King of Queens, Andy Richter Controls the Universe, Boomtown, Special Unit 2, Law & Order: Criminal Intent, Las Vegas, Monk, and ER. Glaudini also appeared briefly in the Neil LaBute film Your Friends & Neighbors.

In the 2006 film Invincible, Glaudini had a brief role as the first wife of Vince Papale, played by Mark Wahlberg, where she is seen berating Papale's career failures and informs him of divorce. She played Kat Damatto on the NBC mini-series Persons Unknown in 2010. She costarred with Mark Harmon in the 2011 USA original movie Certain Prey, based on the bestselling book of the same name by John Sandford.

== Personal life ==
Glaudini lives in Los Angeles with her husband, Stuart England, and two sons.

== Filmography ==
=== Film ===
Film
| Year | Title | Role | Notes |
|---|---|---|---|
| 1996 | Without a Map | Anna | |
| 1998 | Your Friends & Neighbors | Jerry's Student | Uncredited |
| 2000 | Dave's Blind Date | Wife | Short film |
| 2000 | Down to You | Parolee | |
| 2000 | Groove | Leyla | |
| 2001 | Blow | Rada | |
| 2003 | 7 Songs | Josie | |
| 2003 | Consequence | Eva Cruz | |
| 2006 | Invincible | Sharon Papale | |
| 2007 | The Diviner | The Woman | Short film |
| 2007 | Drive-Thru | Brenda Chase | |
| 2010 | Jack Goes Boating | Italian Woman | |
| 2014 | That Awkward Moment | Sharon | |
| 2020 | She's in Portland | Ellen | |

=== Television ===
Television
| Year | Title | Role | Notes |
|---|---|---|---|
| 1996 | NYPD Blue | Karen Thanos / Patty Bell | Episodes: "He's Not Guilty" and "Dead Man Talking" |
| 1997–99 | NYPD Blue | Dolores Mayo | Recurring role (Seasons 5–6) |
| 1997 | The Visitor | Young Constance MacArthur | Episodes: "The Devil's Rainbow" and "Reunion" |
| 1999 | The Magnificent Seven | Maria | Episodes: "The New Law" and "Obsession" |
| 2000 | Secret Agent Man | Helga Devereaux | Episode: "The Breach" |
| 2000 | G vs E | Charlotte Devane | Episode: "Underworld" |
| 2001 | Special Unit 2 | Isabelle | Episode: "The Years" |
| 2001–04 | The Sopranos | Danielle Ciccolella / Deborah Ciccerone | Recurring role (Seasons 3–5) |
| 2002 | The Random Years | Margot | Episode: "Men Behaving Sadly" |
| 2002 | The King of Queens | Margy Coletti | Episode: "Flame Resistant" |
| 2003 | Andy Richter Controls the Universe | Irina | Episode: "The Maid Man" |
| 2003 | Boomtown | Dominatrix | Episode: "Home Invasion" |
| 2003 | Monk | Ariana Dakkar | Episode: "Mr. Monk Goes to the Circus" |
| 2003–04 | The Handler | Heather | Main role |
| 2004 | Las Vegas | A.J. Laveau | Episode: "New Orleans" |
| 2004 | Taste | Giselle | Television film |
| 2005 | Crossing Jordan | Pamela Bragman / Samantha Rae | Episode: "A Stranger Among Us" |
| 2005 | Medical Investigation | Meredith Beck | Episode: "Survivor" |
| 2005 | ER | Captain Jen Whitley | Episode: "Here and There" |
| 2005–06 | Criminal Minds | Elle Greenaway | Main Cast (Seasons 1–2) |
| 2007 | Law & Order: Criminal Intent | Leanne Baker | Episode: "Lonelyville" |
| 2010 | The Good Guys | US Marshall Justine Moreno | Episode: "Don't Tase Me, Bro" |
| 2010 | Persons Unknown | Kat Damatto | Main role |
| 2011 | Blue Bloods | Anna Waiakowski | Episode: "Family Ties" |
| 2011 | Certain Prey | Carmel Loan | Television film |
| 2012 | Law & Order: Special Victims Unit | Virginia Pell | Episode: "Official Story" |
| 2012 | White Collar | Rebecca Ryan | Episode: "Neighborhood Watch" |
| 2012 | Person of Interest | Detective Sherri Lablanca | Episode: "Flesh and Blood" |
| 2013 | Killer Reality | Barbara Gordon | Television film |
| 2014 | Castle | Marilyn Sutton | Episode: "Limelight" |
| 2014 | Unforgettable | Gwen Stein | Episode: "True Identity" |
| 2014–15 | Revenge | Susan Lake | Episodes: "Meteor" and "Bait" |
| 2014 | Franklin & Bash | Freddie Silmas | Episode: "Spirits in the Material World" |
| 2014 | A Christmas Kiss II | Mia | Television film |
| 2015–16 | The Expanse | Captain Shaddid | Recurring role (Season 1) |
| 2016–18 | Agents of S.H.I.E.L.D. | Polly Hinton | 8 Episodes: "Spacetime", "Ascension", "Rewind”, "Inside Voices", “All Roads Lead…”, “Option Two”, “The Force of Gravity” and “The End” |
| 2018 | The Brave | French Ambassador | Episode: "Desperate Measures" |
| 2018–19 | Ray Donovan | Anita Novak | Recurring role |
| 2022 | The Offer | Candida Donadio | Miniseries, 1 episode |
| 2022 | Law & Order: Special Victims Unit | Lena Hess | Episode: "Controlled Burn" |
