= Philip Seymour Hoffman on screen and stage =

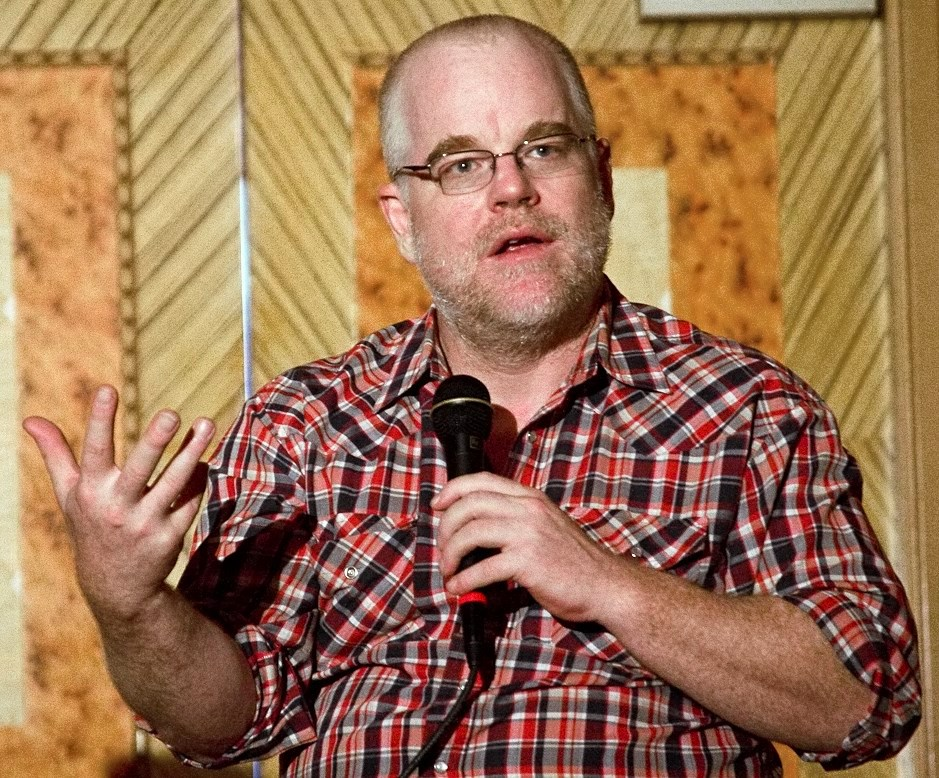
Hoffman in 2010

Philip Seymour Hoffman (1967–2014) was an American actor, director, and producer who made his screen debut on the police procedural Law & Order in 1991. He made his film debut later in the same year by appearing in a minor role in Triple Bogey on a Par Five Hole. Hoffman followed this with supporting roles as a student in Scent of a Woman (1992), and a storm chaser in Twister (1996) before his breakthrough role as a gay boom operator in Paul Thomas Anderson's drama Boogie Nights (1997), for which he received critical acclaim. In the same year, he appeared in the Revolutionary War documentary series Liberty! (1997). Two years later, he played a kind nurse in Anderson's Magnolia and an arrogant playboy in The Talented Mr. Ripley, for which he received the National Board of Review Award for Best Supporting Actor. Hoffman made his Broadway debut the following year with his lead role in True West which garnered him a nomination for the Tony Award for Best Actor in a Play.

Hoffman received the Academy Award for Best Actor, BAFTA Award for Best Actor in a Leading Role, and Golden Globe Award for Best Actor – Motion Picture Drama for his portrayal of writer Truman Capote in the 2005 biographical film Capote. He followed this by playing a ruthless arms dealer in the action spy film Mission: Impossible III (2006) and CIA agent Gust Avrakotos in the Mike Nichols-directed Charlie Wilson's War (2007). Hoffman's performance as a priest suspected of child abuse in the period drama Doubt (2008) with Meryl Streep and Amy Adams received critical acclaim and multiple award nominations in the Best Supporting Actor category. In the same year, he played a troubled theatre director in Charlie Kaufman's Synecdoche, New York.

In 2010, he made his directorial debut with the romantic comedy Jack Goes Boating, an adaptation of the 2007 play in which he had also starred. Two years later, he played a cult leader in Anderson's psychological drama The Master and Willy Loman in the play Death of a Salesman. For the former, Hoffman was nominated for the Best Supporting Actor Oscar, and for the latter he received a nomination for the Tony Award for Best Actor in a Play. He died of an accidental mixed drug overdose on February 2, 2014, at the age of 46. In his New York Times obituary, he was described as "perhaps the most ambitious and widely admired American actor of his generation". Broadway theatres dimmed their lights for one minute in tribute.

== Film ==
List of film credits
Year	Title	Role(s)	Notes	Ref(s)
1991	Triple Bogey on a Par Five Hole	Klutch	Credited as Phil Hoffman	
1992	Szuler	Martin	English title: Cheat; Credited as Phil Hoffman	
1992	My New Gun	Chris		
1992	Leap of Faith	Matt		
1992	Scent of a Woman	George Willis, Jr.	Credited as Philip S. Hoffman	
1993	My Boyfriend's Back	Chuck Bronski		
1993	Joey Breaker	Wiley McCall		
1993	Money for Nothing	Cochran	Credited as Philip S. Hoffman	
1994	The Getaway	Frank Hansen	Credited as Philip Hoffman	
1994	When a Man Loves a Woman	Gary		
1994	Nobody's Fool	Officer Raymer		
1995	The Fifteen Minute Hamlet	Bernardo / Horatio / Laertes	Short film	
1996	Hard Eight	Young Craps Player	Incorrectly credited as Phillip Seymour Hoffman	
1996	Twister	Dustin "Dusty" Davis		
1997	Boogie Nights	Scotty J.		
1997	Culture	Bill	Short film	
1998	Montana	Duncan		
1998	The Big Lebowski	Brandt		
1998	Next Stop Wonderland	Sean	Credited as Phil Hoffman	
1998	Happiness	Allen		
1998	Patch Adams	Mitch		
1999	Flawless	Rusty Zimmerman		
1999	The Talented Mr. Ripley	Freddie Miles		
1999	Magnolia	Phil Parma		
2000	State and Main	Joseph Turner White		
2000	Almost Famous	Lester Bangs		
2002	Love Liza	Wilson Joel		
2002	Punch-Drunk Love	Dean Trumbell		
2002	Red Dragon	Freddy Lounds		
2002	25th Hour	Jacob Elinsky		
2003	Owning Mahowny	Dan Mahowny		
2003	The Party's Over	Himself	Documentary	
2003	Cold Mountain	Reverend Veasey		
2004	Along Came Polly	Sandy Lyle		
2005	Strangers with Candy	Henry	Cameo	
2005	Capote	Truman Capote	Also executive producer	
2006	Mission: Impossible III	Owen Davian		
2007	The Savages	Jon Savage		
2007	Before the Devil Knows You're Dead	Andy Hanson		
2007	Charlie Wilson's War	Gust Avrakotos		
2008	Synecdoche, New York	Caden Cotard		
2008	Doubt	Father Brendan Flynn		
2009	Mary and Max	Max Jerry Horowitz	Voice	
2009	The Boat That Rocked	The Count		
2009	The Invention of Lying	Jim the Bartender	Cameo	
2010	Jack Goes Boating	Jack	Also director and executive producer	
2011	The Ides of March	Paul Zara		
2011	Moneyball	Art Howe		
2012	The Master	Lancaster Dodd		
2012	A Late Quartet	Robert Gelbart		
2013	Salinger	Himself	Documentary	
2013	The Hunger Games: Catching Fire	Plutarch Heavensbee		
2014	God's Pocket	Mickey Scarpato	Also producer	
2014	A Most Wanted Man	Günther Bachmann		
2014	The Hunger Games: Mockingjay – Part 1	Plutarch Heavensbee	Posthumous release	
2015	The Hunger Games: Mockingjay – Part 2	Plutarch Heavensbee	Posthumous release	

== Television ==
List of television credits
Year(s)	Title	Role(s)	Notes	Ref(s)
1991	Law & Order	Steven B. Hanauer	Episode: "The Violence of Summer"; Credited as Philip Hoffman	
1994	The Yearling	Buck	Television film	
1997	Liberty!	Joseph Plumb Martin	4 episodes; Documentary	
2005	Empire Falls	Charlie Mayne	2 episodes; Miniseries	
2009	Arthur	Will Toffman (voice)	Episode: "No Acting Please"	
2014	Happyish	Thom Payne	Unaired pilot	

== Stage ==
List of theater credits
Year(s)	Title	Theater	Role	Notes	Ref(s)
1996	The Skriker	The Public Theater	RawHeadAndBloodyBones	April 23 – May 26	
1997–1998	Defying Gravity	The American Place Theatre	C.B.	November 2, 1997 – January 4, 1998	
1998	Shopping and Fucking	New York Theatre Workshop	Mark	March 17 – April 11	
1999	The Author's Voice & Imagining Brad	Greenwich House Theater	Gene	May 11–29	
2000	True West	Circle in the Square Theatre	Lee / Austin	March 2 – June 18	
2000	Jesus Hopped the 'A' Train	Classic Stage Company	—N/a	Director; November 29 – December 31	
2001	The Seagull	Delacorte Theater	Konstantin	August 12–26	
2001	The Glory of Living	MCC Theater	—N/a	Director; October 30 – December 1	
2003	Our Lady of 121st Street	Union Square Theatre	—N/a	Director; March 6 – July 27	
2003	Long Day's Journey into Night	Plymouth Theatre	James Tyrone, Jr.	May 6 – August 31	
2003	Dutch Heart of Man	The Public Theater	—N/a	Artistic director; September 25 – October 19	
2004	Guinea Pig Solo	The Public Theater	—N/a	Artistic director; May 9 – June 6	
2004	Sailor's Song	The Public Theater	—N/a	Executive director; November 7–21	
2005	The Last Days of Judas Iscariot	The Public Theater	—N/a	Director and artistic director; March 2 – April 3	
2005	Sawbones	St. Ann's Warehouse; Royal Festival Hall	Frontier Veterinarian	April 28–30, May 13	
2006	School of the Americas	The Public Theater	—N/a	Artistic director; July 6–23	
2006	A Small, Melodramatic Story	The Public Theater	—N/a	Artistic director; October 24 – November 5	
2007	Jack Goes Boating	The Public Theater	Jack	Artistic director; March 18 – April 29	
2007	A View from 151st Street	The Public Theater	—N/a	Artistic director; October 18 – November 4	
2008	Unconditional	The Public Theater	—N/a	Artistic director; February 18 – March 9	
2008	The Little Flower of East Orange	The Public Theater	—N/a	Director; April 6 – May 4	
2009	Othello	Skirball Center for the Performing Arts	Iago	September 27 – October 4	
2010	The Long Red Road	Goodman Theatre	—N/a	Director; February 22 – March 21	
2012	Death of a Salesman	Ethel Barrymore Theatre	Willy Loman	March 15 – June 2	
2013	A Family for All Occasions	Bank Street Theater	—N/a	Director; May 12–26	

== Bibliography ==
- Shelley, Peter (January 9, 2017). Philip Seymour Hoffman: The Life and Work. McFarland. ISBN 9781476662435.
