= List of awards and nominations received by Philip Seymour Hoffman =

Philip Seymour Hoffman awards and nominations
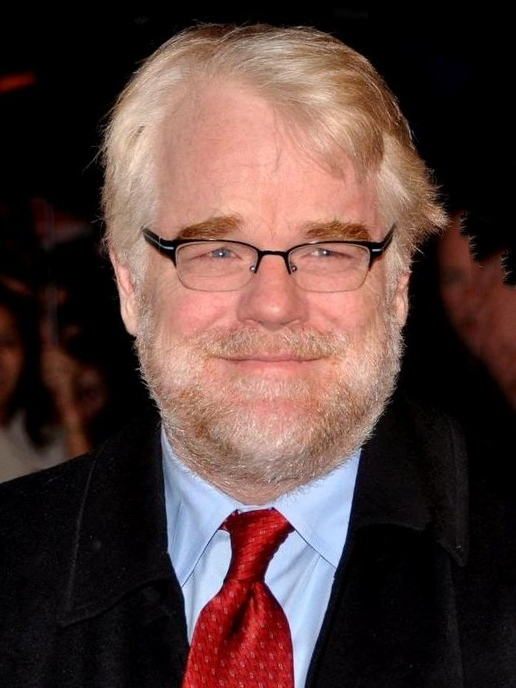
- Hoffman at the Paris premiere of The Ides of March on October 18, 2011
Awards and nominations
Award	Wins	Nominations
Golden Globe	1	5
Academy Awards	1	4
BAFTA Awards	1	5
Emmy Awards	0	2
Tony Awards	0	3

Totals (Note: Certain award groups do not simply award one winner. They acknowledge several different recipients, have runners-up, and have third place. Since this is a specific recognition and is different from losing an award, runner-up mentions are considered wins in this award tally. For simplification and to avoid errors, each award in this list has been presumed to have had a prior nomination.)
- Wins: 3
- Nominations: 19

Philip Seymour Hoffman, an actor on stage and screen, received numerous accolades including an Academy Award, a BAFTA Award, a Golden Globe Award, and a Screen Actors Guild Award as well as nominations for two Emmy Awards and three Tony Awards.

Hoffman received the Academy Award for Best Actor for his portrayal as Truman Capote in Bennett Miller's film Capote (2005). The role also earned him the BAFTA Award for Best Actor in a Leading Role, the Golden Globe Award for Best Actor in a Motion Picture – Drama, and the Screen Actors Guild Award for Outstanding Actor in a Leading Role. Hoffman was Oscar-nominated for playing Gust Avrakotos in the Mike Nichols comedy-drama film Charlie Wilson's War (2007), a priest accused of misconduct in John Patrick Shanley's religious drama Doubt (2008), and a cult leader in Paul Thomas Anderson's psychological drama The Master (2012). For the latter he received the Volpi Cup for Best Actor.

For his roles on television he received a Primetime Emmy Award for Outstanding Supporting Actor in a Limited Series or Movie nomination for his dual performance as C.B. Whiting and Charlie Mayne in the HBO miniseries Empire Falls (2005). He was also nominated for the Daytime Emmy Award for Outstanding Performer in an Animated Program for voicing theatre director William Fillmore Toffman in the PBS series Arthur (2003).

On stage, Hoffman acted in numerous Broadway productions earning three Tony Award nominations for playing a drifter in Sam Shepard's play True West (2000), Jamie Tyrone Jr. in the Eugene O'Neill revival Long Day's Journey into Night (2003), Willy Loman in the revival of the Arthur Miller play Death of a Salesman (2012). He also received a Theater World Award and nominations for 7 Drama Desk Award and two Lucille Lortel Awards.

== Major associations ==
=== Academy Awards ===
Year	Category	Nominated work	Result	Ref.
2006	Best Actor	Capote	Won	
2008	Best Supporting Actor	Charlie Wilson's War	Nominated	
2009	Best Supporting Actor	Doubt	Nominated	
2013	Best Supporting Actor	The Master	Nominated	

=== BAFTA Awards ===
Year	Category	Nominated work	Result	Ref.
British Academy Film Awards
2005	Best Actor in a Leading Role	Capote	Won	
2008	Best Actor in a Supporting Role	Charlie Wilson's War	Nominated	
2009	Best Actor in a Supporting Role	Doubt	Nominated	
2012	Best Actor in a Supporting Role	The Ides of March	Nominated	
2013	Best Actor in a Supporting Role	The Master	Nominated	

=== Emmy Awards ===
Year	Category	Nominated work	Result	Ref.
Primetime Emmy Awards
2005	Outstanding Supporting Actor in a Miniseries or Movie	Empire Falls	Nominated	
Daytime Emmy Award
2009	Outstanding Performer in an Animated Program	Arthur: No Acting, Please	Nominated	

=== Golden Globe Awards ===
Year	Category	Nominated work	Result	Ref.
2006	Best Actor – Motion Picture Drama	Capote	Won	
2008	Best Actor – Motion Picture Musical or Comedy	The Savages	Nominated	
2008	Best Supporting Actor – Motion Picture	Charlie Wilson's War	Nominated	
2009	Best Supporting Actor – Motion Picture	Doubt	Nominated	
2013	Best Supporting Actor – Motion Picture	The Master	Nominated	

=== Screen Actors Guild Awards ===
Year	Category	Nominated work	Result	Ref.
1998	Outstanding Ensemble Cast in a Motion Picture	Boogie Nights	Nominated	
2000	Outstanding Actor in a Leading Role	Flawless	Nominated	
2000	Outstanding Ensemble Cast in a Motion Picture	Magnolia	Nominated	
2001	Outstanding Ensemble Cast in a Motion Picture	Almost Famous	Nominated	
2006	Outstanding Male Actor in a Leading Role	Capote	Won	
2006	Outstanding Ensemble Cast in a Motion Picture	Capote	Nominated	
2009	Outstanding Ensemble Cast in a Motion Picture	Doubt	Nominated	
2009	Outstanding Actor in a Supporting Role	Doubt	Nominated	
2013	Outstanding Actor in a Supporting Role	The Master	Nominated	

=== Tony Awards ===
Year	Category	Nominated work	Result	Ref.
2000	Best Actor in a Play	True West	Nominated	
2003	Best Featured Actor in a Play	Long Day's Journey into Night	Nominated	
2012	Best Actor in a Play	Death of a Salesman	Nominated	

== Film critic awards ==
Organizations	Year	Category	Work	Result	Ref.
Austin Film Critics Association	2005	Best Actor	Capote	Won	
Boston Society of Film Critics	2005	Best Actor	Capote	Won	
Critics' Choice Movie Awards	2005	Best Actor	Capote	Won	
Critics' Choice Movie Awards	2007	Best Supporting Actor	Charlie Wilson's War	Nominated	
Critics' Choice Movie Awards	2008	Best Cast	Doubt	Nominated	
Critics' Choice Movie Awards	2008	Best Supporting Actor	Doubt	Nominated	
Critics' Choice Movie Awards	2011	Best Cast	The Ides of March	Nominated	
Critics' Choice Movie Awards	2012	Best Supporting Actor	The Master	Won	
Chicago Film Critics Association	2005	Best Actor	Doubt	Won	
Chicago Film Critics Association	2007	Best Supporting Actor	Charlie Wilson's War	Nominated	
Chicago Film Critics Association	2008	Best Supporting Actor	Doubt	Nominated	
Chicago Film Critics Association	2012	Best Supporting Actor	The Master	Won	
Dallas–Fort Worth Film Critics Association	2005	Best Actor	Capote	Won	
Dallas–Fort Worth Film Critics Association	2007	Best Supporting Actor	Charlie Wilson's War	Nominated	
Dallas–Fort Worth Film Critics Association	2008	Best Supporting Actor	Doubt	Nominated	
Dallas–Fort Worth Film Critics Association	2012	Best Supporting Actor	The Master	Nominated	
Detroit Film Critics Society	2012	Best Supporting Actor	The Master	Nominated	
Florida Film Critics Circle	1997	Best Cast	Boogie Nights	Won	
Florida Film Critics Circle	1999	Best Cast	Magnolia	Won	
Florida Film Critics Circle	2000	Best Cast	State and Main	Won	
Florida Film Critics Circle	2005	Best Actor	Capote	Won	
Florida Film Critics Circle	2012	Best Supporting Actor	The Master	Won	
Houston Film Critics Society	2012	Best Supporting Actor	The Master	Nominated	
London Film Critics Circle	2005	Actor of the Year	Capote	Nominated	
London Film Critics Circle	2012	Supporting Actor of the Year	The Master	Won	
Los Angeles Film Critics Association	2005	Best Actor	Capote	Won	
National Board of Review	1998	Best Cast	Happiness	Won	
National Board of Review	1999	Best Cast	Magnolia	Won	
National Board of Review	1999	Best Supporting Actor	Magnolia & The Talented Mr. Ripley	Won	
National Board of Review	2005	Best Actor	Capote	Won	
National Society of Film Critics	2005	Best Actor	Capote	Won	
National Society of Film Critics	2005	Best Supporting Actor	Charlie Wilson's War	Nominated	
National Society of Film Critics	2012	Best Supporting Actor	The Master	Nominated	
New York Film Critics Online	2005	Best Actor	Capote	Won	
Online Film Critics Society	2005	Best Actor	Capote	Won	
Online Film Critics Society	2007	Best Supporting Actor	Charlie Wilson's War	Nominated	
Online Film Critics Society	2008	Best Supporting Actor	Doubt	Nominated	
Online Film Critics Society	2012	Best Supporting Actor	The Master	Won	
San Diego Film Critics Society	1999	Best Supporting Actor	Flawless	Won	
San Diego Film Critics Society	2005	Best Actor	Capote	Won	
San Diego Film Critics Society	2012	Best Supporting Actor	The Master	Nominated	
Toronto Film Critics Association	2005	Best Actor	Capote	Won	
Toronto Film Critics Association	2007	Best Supporting Actor	Charlie Wilson's War	Nominated	
Toronto Film Critics Association	2008	Best Supporting Actor	Doubt	Nominated	
Toronto Film Critics Association	2012	Best Supporting Actor	The Master	Won	
Vancouver Film Critics Circle	2003	Best Actor in a Canadian Film	Owning Mahowny	Won	
Vancouver Film Critics Circle	2005	Best Actor	Capote	Won	
Vancouver Film Critics Circle	2008	Best Supporting Actor	Doubt	Nominated	
Vancouver Film Critics Circle	2012	Best Supporting Actor	The Master	Won	
Washington D.C. Area Film Critics Association	2005	Best Actor	Capote	Won	
Washington D.C. Area Film Critics Association	2008	Best Ensemble	Doubt	Won	
Washington D.C. Area Film Critics Association	2012	Best Supporting Actor	The Master	Won	

== Miscellaneous awards ==
Organizations	Year	Category	Work	Result	Ref.
Alliance of Women Film Journalists	2012	Best Supporting Actor	The Master	Won	
Independent Spirit Award	1998	Best Supporting Male	Happiness	Nominated	
Independent Spirit Award	2005	Best Male Lead	Capote	Won	
Independent Spirit Award	2007	Best Male Lead	The Savages	Won	
Independent Spirit Award	2008	Robert Altman Award	Synecdoche, New York	Won	
Saturn Award	2007	Best Supporting actor	Mission: Impossible III	Nominated	
Satellite Award	1998	Best Ensemble Cast – Motion Picture	Boogie Nights	Won	
Satellite Award	1998	Best Actor in a Motion Picture	Flawless	Won	
Satellite Award	2000	Best Supporting Actor in a Motion Picture	Almost Famous	Nominated	
Satellite Award	2002	Best Supporting Actor in a Motion Picture	Punch-Drunk Love	Nominated	
Satellite Award	2005	Best Actor in a Motion Picture	Capote	Won	
Satellite Award	2008	Best Supporting Actor – Motion Picture	Doubt	Nominated	
Satellite Award	2012	Best Supporting Actor – Motion Picture	The Master	Nominated	
Venice International Film Festival	2012	Volpi Cup for Best Actor	The Master	Won	

== Theatre awards ==
Organizations	Year	Category	Work	Result	Ref.
Drama Desk Awards	2000	Outstanding Featured Actor in a Play	The Author's Voice & Imagining Brad	Nominated	
Drama Desk Awards	2000	Outstanding Actor in a Play	True West	Nominated	
Drama Desk Awards	2001	Outstanding Director of a Play	Jesus Hopped the 'A' Train	Nominated	
Drama Desk Awards	2003	Outstanding Director of a Play	Our Lady of 121st Street	Nominated	
Drama Desk Awards	2003	Outstanding Featured Actor in a Play	Long Day's Journey into Night	Nominated	
Drama Desk Awards	2007	Outstanding Actor in a Play	Jack Goes Boating	Nominated	
Drama Desk Awards	2012	Outstanding Actor in a Play	Death of a Salesman	Nominated	
Theatre World Award	2000	Best Performance	True West	Won	
Lucille Lortel Award	2003	Outstanding Director	Our Lady of 121st Street	Nominated	
Lucille Lortel Award	2007	Outstanding Lead Actor	Jack Goes Boating	Nominated	
