= The Marc Pease Experience =

- Promotional film poster
- Directed by: Todd Louiso
- Written by: Todd Louiso; Jacob Koskoff
- Produced by: Michael London; Bruna Papandrea; David Rubin
- Starring: Jason Schwartzman; Ben Stiller; Anna Kendrick; Ebon Moss-Bachrach
- Cinematography: Tim Suhrstedt
- Edited by: Julie Monroe
- Music by: Christophe Beck
- Production company: Groundswell Productions
- Distributed by: Paramount Pictures (through Paramount Vantage)
- Release date: August 21, 2009
- Running time: 84 minutes
- Country: United States
- Language: English
- Box office: $390,584

The Marc Pease Experience is a 2009 comedy film directed by Todd Louiso and written by Louiso and Jacob Koskoff. Shot primarily in and around Wilmington and New Hanover County, North Carolina in early 2007, the film is centered on Marc Pease, a man living in the past, when he was the star of his high school's musicals. The film stars Jason Schwartzman as Pease, Ben Stiller as Marc's former mentor, and Anna Kendrick as his love interest.

== Plot ==
In high school, Marc Pease (Jason Schwartzman) ran out on his performance as the Tin Man in a production of The Wiz, succumbing to his stage fright despite his mentor Mr. Jon Gribble's (Ben Stiller) encouragement. Eight years later, he is dating Meg Brickman (Anna Kendrick), a high school senior who is bitter about being in the chorus and not having a principal role in Gribble's latest production of The Wiz. Marc is keen for Gribble to produce the demo tape for his a cappella singing group Meridian 8 (which has already lost four of eight original members). Gribble, however, tries to avoid Marc, frustrated that Marc refuses to leave him alone because of the friendly advice he gave Marc eight years ago.

While tidying Meg's bedroom, Marc finds a tape labelled "Meg singing", but discovers after he listens to it that she is singing with Gribble, and at the end of the song, their noises suggest that they are having sex. Meg, meanwhile, begins to doubt Gribble's sincerity when he tells her what a terrific singer she is when she realizes that she is always in the chorus. Questioning whether she even enjoys singing, she decides to quit. Marc drives to a performance with Meridian 8, where the only way he can keep the group from splitting up is to lie that Gribble has given them the chance to record in a studio. After insisting that he should sing his Tin Man's song, he starts crying on stage, and is later forced to admit that Gribble has not yet responded to his request to produce the demo. That night, the opening night of The Wiz, Marc is working as a chauffeur for a high school prom couple. After dropping them off and cutting off his frequently ridiculed ponytail, he arrives at the show in the interval. He unsuccessfully tries to discuss Meridian 8's demo with Gribble, who brushes him off, then learns from another bandmate that they are losing another member.

After hearing the Tin Man's song from outside the auditorium, Marc goes inside and drags Gribble out into an empty classroom. Marc confronts him about his empty promises for Meridian 8 to record in a studio. Gribble tells Marc that he is still living as if he were in high school, and an angered Marc threatens to play Meg's tape to the school principal and expose Gribble's affair with a student. As they fight, Marc accuses Gribble of denying Meg a main role as a means of revenge on him, and destroys the tape for Meg's sake. He then goes backstage and breaks up with Meg because she is too young for him. Seeing that the actor of the Wiz has injured himself, Marc takes his cape, runs onto the stage and sings the Wiz's song. Meg runs away but decides that she loves singing and returns to the stage. Marc's performance is met with cheers from the audience, and he is overjoyed.

One year later, having exorcised his Wizard of Oz demons, Marc is working as a professional singer under the title "The Marc Pease Experience".

== Cast ==
- Jason Schwartzman as Marc Pease.
- Ben Stiller as Mr. Jon Gribble, Marc's overzealous former mentor.
- Anna Kendrick as Meg Brickman, a high school senior, romantically involved with both Pease and Gribble.
- Jay Paulson as Gerry
- Ebon Moss-Bachrach as Gavin
- Gabrielle Dennis as Tracey
- Amber Wallace as Ilona
- Shannon Holt as Debbie
- Austin Herring as Mr. Edwards
- Kelen Coleman as Stephanie
- Joe Inscoe as Mr. Brickman
- Matt Cornwell as Rick Berger
- Preston Corbell as The Winged Monkey
- Damien Haas as Techie
- Tyler Easter as The Lion
- Brittney McNamara as Dorothy
- Jared Grimes as The Wiz
- Dylan Hubbard as The Tinman
- Chaz McNeil as Brendan/The Scarecrow

== Production ==
The Marc Pease Experience is Todd Louiso's second directorial project, having previously directed Love Liza (2002) and acted in minor roles in High Fidelity (2000), Thank You for Smoking (2006) and Snakes on a Plane (2006). Jason Schwartzman was signed to star in the film by February 2007, with Ben Stiller in talks. Final funding from Paramount Vantage and producer Michael London was received in early February, with production slated to start in March. Anna Kendrick's role in the film was announced in mid-April, after filming had begun.

Principal photography began on March 12, 2007, in the state of North Carolina, where the entirety of the film was shot. Various locations around Wilmington and New Hanover County were used for filming, including Wilmington's Eugene Ashley High School and the school's auditorium. Filming continued through March and into April. On the last day of shooting at Eugene Ashley High, Stiller presented the school's morning announcements.

A number of student interns from the University of North Carolina at Wilmington's Film Studies Department were actively involved in The Marc Pease Experience's production as part of their internship program. After principal photography was completed, during post-production Louiso "realized we needed to go back and add some stuff". The 2007–2008 Writers Guild of America strike began at this time, however, and so there was a delay of six months before the extra scenes could be scripted and filmed.

== Release ==
The Marc Pease Experience had a limited release into 10 U.S. markets on August 21, 2009. The film opened in San Francisco, Chicago, Philadelphia, Miami, Dallas, Cleveland, Minneapolis, Seattle, Sacramento, and Boston in what was described by Drew Taylor of The Playlist as only "an obligation by the studio to release the film theatrically".

In a New Yorker profile of Ben Stiller, Stiller and his agent, Nick Stevens, acknowledged asking the studio to bury the film to protect the star’s reputation for making hit movies. “The completed film fell well short of [Stiller’s] hopes. ‘Paramount could have put it out there as the next big Ben Stiller movie,’ he says, ‘but that would have been fooling the audience.’ Nick Stevens called Paramount to ask the studio to weigh the short-term loss of limiting the film’s release against the long-term relationship with his filmmaker. Paramount released the film domestically in just ten theatres for a single week, and it grossed exactly $4,033.”

=== Box office ===
The film grossed $3,000 from 10 screens on its opening weekend with a per-screen average of only $300. By the end of its domestic run, the film had grossed $4,033 and an international addition of $386,551, totaling $390,584.

=== Critical reception ===
Before the film's release, Alex Billington of FirstShowing.net dubbed it "the next Rushmore" — which also starred Jason Schwartzman in the lead — based on the similar character elements.

In spite of this early buzz, however, critical response was overwhelmingly negative. Roger Ebert called it "badly written and inertly directed, with actors who don't have a clue what drives their characters". The A.V. Club's Nathan Rabin, in a "D+" review, asked, "Who could have guessed a concept as promising and long overdue as a musical Jason Schwartzman vehicle would lead to such a regrettable little nothing?"

On review aggregator website Rotten Tomatoes, the film holds an approval rating of 18% based on 11 reviews, with an average rating of 3.18/10.
