= Gordy Hoffman =

American screenwriter and director

- Born: Gordon Richard Hoffman
- Occupations: Screenwriter, director
- Relatives: Philip Seymour Hoffman (brother); Cooper Hoffman (nephew)

Gordon Richard Hoffman is an American screenwriter and director. He is the older brother of actor Philip Seymour Hoffman.

== Biography ==
=== Early life ===
His mother, Marilyn O'Connor (née Loucks), a native of Waterloo, New York, is a family court judge and lawyer. His father, Gordon Stowell Hoffman, is a former Xerox executive. He has two sisters, Jill and Emily, in addition to his late brother Philip. His parents divorced in 1976.

Hoffman was raised in Fairport, New York. He graduated from the University of Kansas in 1987.

After graduating, Hoffman lived in Chicago and Washington, D.C., where he pursued writing and directing in theater. He later moved to Los Angeles.

== Career ==
=== Theater ===
Hoffman wrote his first play, Hong Kong, in Washington, D.C. Hoffman’s other plays include Bevakasha, A Stab at Fixing, Frozen Cat, Bed Set, Happyland, Outdoor MAAN, and A Deeper Water.

In 1994, Hoffman founded Company, an experimental theater workshop in Chicago. Through Company, Hoffman directed productions of Titus Andronicus and She Ventures and He Wins. Hoffman also founded Company’s Marathon, an annual back-to-back reading of William Shakespeare’s 37 plays.

=== Film ===
In 1998, Hoffman founded the BlueCat Screenplay Competition to discover and develop emerging screenwriters.

In 2002, he wrote the screenplay for the film Love Liza, about a man dealing with his wife's suicide. The Guardian's Peter Bradshaw described it as a "very melancholy evening in the cinema ... an intelligent and harrowing movie," while Ed Gonzalez from Slant Magazine disparagingly wrote: "Love Liza will have a difficult time distinguishing itself from Alexander Payne's About Schmidt, another widower-in-chaos comedy starring [Kathy] Bates in an undervalued role. Love Liza is nowhere near as condescending but its shrill pitch makes it just as difficult to take." The film received the Waldo Salt Screenwriting Award at the 2002 Sundance Film Festival.

Hoffman made his feature directorial debut with A Coat of Snow, which he also wrote and produced. The film premiered at the 2005 Locarno International Film Festival.

In 2015, Hoffman wrote and directed the short film Dog Bowl, which screened at the Sundance Film Festival.

=== Teaching ===
Hoffman has taught screenwriting at the USC School of Cinematic Arts and the UCLA School of Theater, Film and Television.
