= Philip Seymour Hoffman =

American actor (1967–2014)

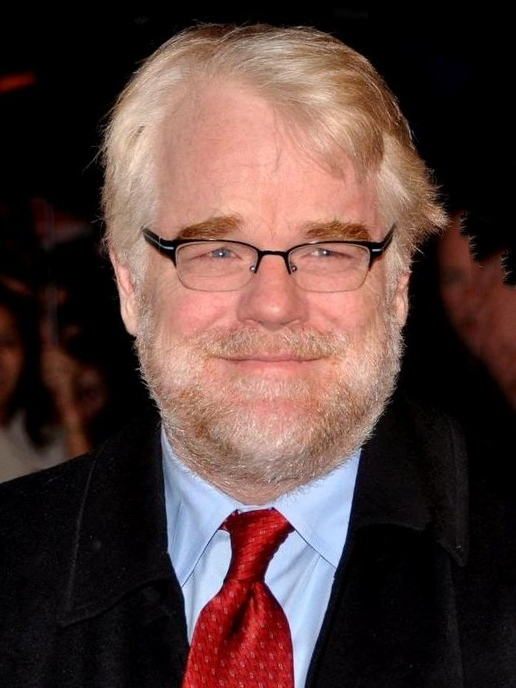
- Hoffman in 2011
- Born: Philip Hoffman; July 23, 1967; Fairport, New York, U.S.
- Died: February 2, 2014 (aged 46); New York City, U.S.
- Education: New York University (BFA)
- Occupations: Actor; producer; director
- Years active: 1991–2014
- Works: Full list
- Partner: Mimi O'Donnell (1999–2014)
- Children: 3, including Cooper
- Relatives: Gordy Hoffman (brother)
- Awards: Full list

Philip Seymour Hoffman (July 23, 1967 – February 2, 2014) was an American actor. He was known for his distinctive supporting character roles and his memorable leading roles in many films and theatrical productions from the early 1990s until his death in 2014. He was voted the greatest film actor of the 21st century in a 2024 ranking by The Independent.

Hoffman studied acting at New York University Tisch School of the Arts. He gained recognition for his supporting work, notably in Scent of a Woman (1992), Boogie Nights (1997), Happiness (1998), The Big Lebowski (1998), Magnolia (1999), and The Talented Mr. Ripley (1999). Hoffman began to occasionally play leading roles, and he won the Academy Award for Best Actor for his portrayal of Truman Capote in Capote (2005). He was also nominated for Academy Award for Best Supporting Actor for his performances in Charlie Wilson's War (2007), Doubt (2008), and The Master (2012). While he mainly worked in independent films, Hoffman also appeared in Hollywood blockbusters such as Twister (1996) and Mission: Impossible III (2006). In one of his final roles before his death, he played Plutarch Heavensbee in the Hunger Games series (2013–2015). The feature film Jack Goes Boating (2010) marked Hoffman's debut as a filmmaker.

Hoffman was also an accomplished theater actor and director. He joined the off-Broadway LAByrinth Theater Company in 1995; while there, he directed, produced, and appeared in numerous stage productions. Hoffman received Tony Award nominations for his performances in the Broadway revivals of Sam Shepard's True West (2000), Eugene O'Neill's Long Day's Journey into Night (2003), and Arthur Miller's Death of a Salesman (2012).

Hoffman struggled with substance abuse. On February 2, 2014, Hoffman died from "acute mixed drug intoxication, including heroin, cocaine, benzodiazepines and amphetamine". Remembered for the nuance, depth, and humanity he brought to his diverse roles, Hoffman was described in his obituary in The New York Times as "perhaps the most ambitious and widely admired American actor of his generation".

== Early life and education ==
Hoffman was born on July 23, 1967, in the Rochester suburb of Fairport, New York. His mother, Marilyn O'Connor (née Loucks), came from nearby Waterloo and worked as an elementary school teacher before becoming a lawyer and eventually a family court judge. His father, Gordon Stowell Hoffman, was a native of Geneva, New York, and worked for the Xerox Corporation. Hoffman had one brother, Gordy, and two sisters, Jill and Emily. He had Irish and German ancestry.

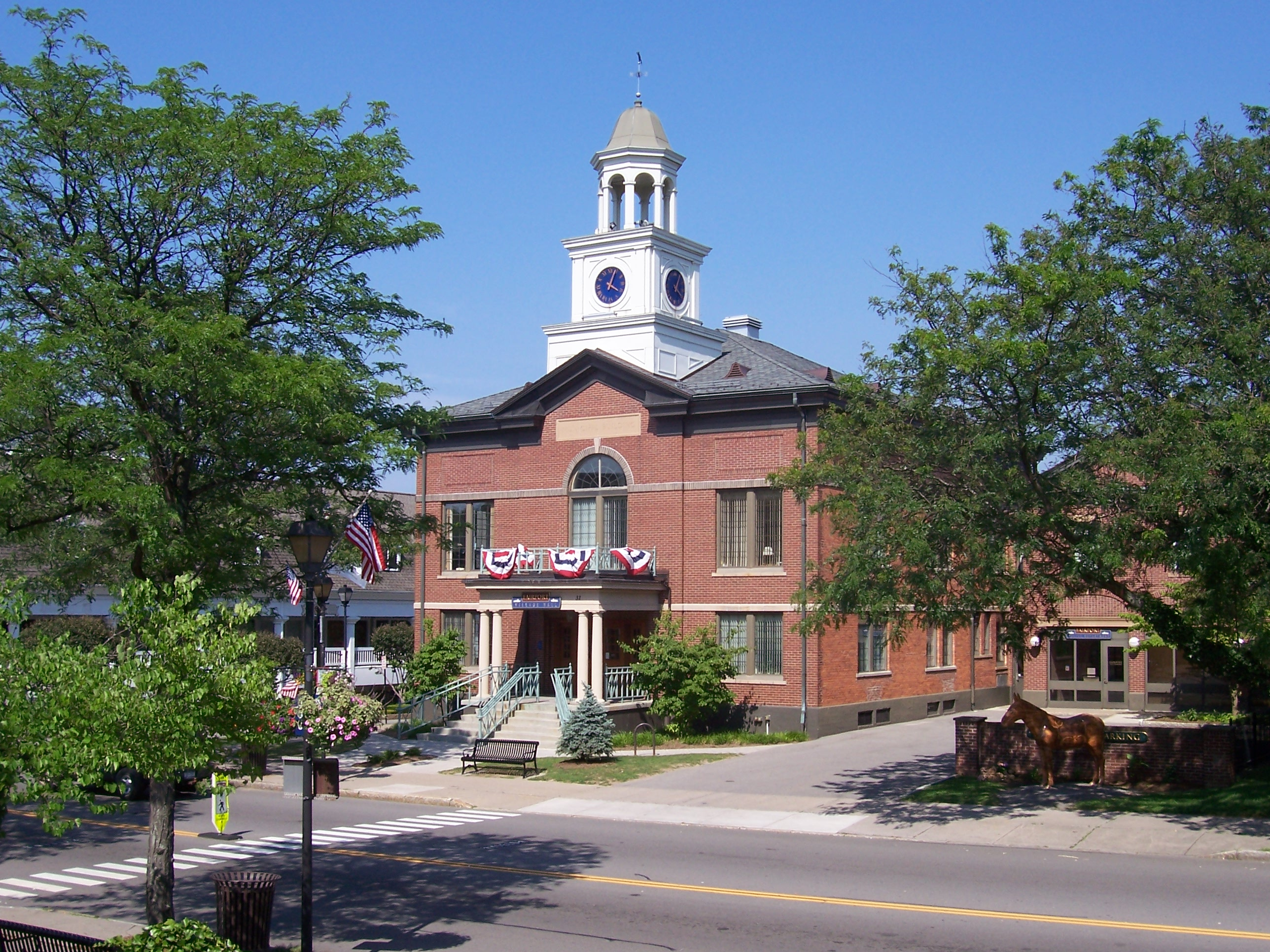
The village of Fairport, New York, Hoffman's hometown

Hoffman was baptized a Catholic and attended Mass as a child, but did not have a heavily religious upbringing. His parents divorced when he was nine, and the children were raised primarily by their mother. Hoffman's childhood passion was sports, particularly wrestling and baseball, but at age 12, he attended a stage production of Arthur Miller's All My Sons and was transfixed. He recalled in 2008, "I was changed—permanently changed—by that experience. It was like a miracle to me." Hoffman developed a love for the theater, and proceeded to attend regularly with his mother, who was a lifelong enthusiast. He remembered that productions of Quilters and Alms for the Middle Class, the latter starring a teenaged Robert Downey Jr., were also particularly inspirational. At age 14, Hoffman suffered a neck injury that ended his sporting activity, and he began to consider acting. Encouraged by his mother, he joined a drama club, and initially committed to it because he was attracted to a female member.

Acting gradually became a passion for Hoffman: "I loved the camaraderie of it, the people, and that's when I decided it was what I wanted to do." At age 17, he was selected to attend the 1984 New York State Summer School of the Arts in Saratoga Springs, where he met his future collaborators Bennett Miller and Dan Futterman. Miller later commented on Hoffman's popularity at the time: "We were attracted to the fact that he was genuinely serious about what he was doing. Even then, he was passionate." Hoffman applied for several drama degree programs and was accepted to New York University's (NYU) Tisch School of the Arts. Between graduating from Fairport High School and beginning the program, he continued his training at the Circle in the Square Theatre's summer program. Hoffman had positive memories of his time at NYU, where he supported himself by working as an usher. With friends, he co-founded the Bullstoi Ensemble acting troupe. He earned a drama degree in 1989.

== Career ==
=== 1991–1995: Early career ===
After graduating, Hoffman worked in off-Broadway theater and made additional money with customer service jobs. He made his screen debut in 1991, in a Law & Order episode called "The Violence of Summer", playing a man accused of rape. He made his film debut the following year, when he was credited as "Phil Hoffman" in the independent film Triple Bogey on a Par Five Hole. After this, he adopted his grandfather's name, Seymour, to avoid confusion with another actor.

More film roles promptly followed, with appearances in Adek Drabiński's The Cheat as a butler to Jerzy Zelnik's Count Victor, then the studio production My New Gun, and a small role in the comedy Leap of Faith, starring Steve Martin. Following these roles, he gained attention playing a spoiled private school student in the Oscar-winning Al Pacino film Scent of a Woman (1992). Hoffman auditioned five times for his role, which The Guardian journalist Ryan Gilbey says gave him an early opportunity "to indulge his skill for making unctuousness compelling". The film earned US$134 million worldwide and was the first to get Hoffman noticed. Reflecting on Scent of a Woman, Hoffman later said, "If I hadn't gotten into that film, I wouldn't be where I am today." At this time, he quit his job in a delicatessen to become a professional actor.

Hoffman continued playing small roles throughout the early 1990s. After appearing in Joey Breaker and the critically panned teen zombie picture My Boyfriend's Back, he had a more notable role playing John Cusack's wealthy friend in the crime comedy Money for Nothing. In 1994, he portrayed an inexperienced mobster in the crime thriller The Getaway, starring Alec Baldwin and Kim Basinger, and he subsequently appeared with Andy García and Meg Ryan in the romantic drama When a Man Loves a Woman. He then played an uptight police deputy who gets punched by Paul Newman—one of Hoffman's acting idols—in the drama Nobody's Fool.

Still considering stage work to be fundamental to his career, Hoffman joined the LAByrinth Theater Company of New York City in 1995. This association lasted the remainder of his life; along with appearing in multiple productions, he later became co-artistic director of the theater company with John Ortiz, and directed various plays over the years. Hoffman's only film appearance of 1995 was in the 22-minute short comedy The Fifteen Minute Hamlet, which satirized the film industry in an Elizabethan setting. He played the characters of Bernardo, Horatio, and Laertes alongside Austin Pendleton's Hamlet.

=== 1996–1999: Rising star ===
Between April and May 1996, Hoffman appeared at the Joseph Papp Public Theater in a Mark Wing-Davey production of Caryl Churchill's The Skriker. Afterwards, based on his work in Scent of a Woman, he was cast by writer–director Paul Thomas Anderson to appear in Anderson's debut feature Hard Eight (1996). Hoffman had only a brief role in the crime thriller, playing a cocksure young craps player, but it began the most important collaboration of his career. (Note: Hoffman continued to collaborate with Anderson, appearing in all but one of the director's first six films. The others were Boogie Nights, Magnolia, Punch-Drunk Love, and The Master.) Before cementing a creative partnership with Anderson, Hoffman appeared in one of the year's biggest blockbusters, Twister, playing a grubby, hyperactive storm chaser alongside Helen Hunt and Bill Paxton. According to a People survey of Twitter and Facebook users, Twister is the film with which Hoffman is most popularly associated. He then reunited with Anderson for the director's second feature, Boogie Nights, about the Golden Age of Pornography. The ensemble piece starred Mark Wahlberg, Julianne Moore, and Burt Reynolds; Hoffman played a boom operator, described by David Fear of Rolling Stone as a "complete, unabashed loser", who attempts to seduce Wahlberg's character. Warmly received by critics, the film grew into a cult classic, and has been cited as the role in which Hoffman first showed his full ability. Fear commended the "naked emotional neediness" of the performance, adding that it made for compulsive viewing. Hoffman later expressed his appreciation for Anderson when he called the director "incomparable".

That wasn't easy. It's hard to sit in your boxers and jerk off in front of people for three hours. I was pretty heavy, and I was afraid that people would laugh at me. Todd said they might laugh, but they won't laugh at you. He saw what we were working for, which was the pathos of the moment. Sometimes, acting is a really private thing that you do for the world.

— Hoffman on his role in Happiness (1998)

Continuing with this momentum, Hoffman appeared in five films in 1998. He had supporting roles in the crime thriller Montana and the romantic comedy Next Stop Wonderland, both of which were commercial failures, before working with the Coen brothers in their dark comedy The Big Lebowski. Hoffman had long been a fan of the directors, and relished the experience of working with them. Appearing alongside Jeff Bridges and John Goodman, Hoffman played Brandt, the smug personal assistant of the titular character. Although it was only a small role, he said it was one for which he was most recognized, in a film that has achieved cult status and a large fan base. Between March and April 1998, Hoffman made 30 appearances on stage at the New York Theatre Workshop in a production of Mark Ravenhill's Shopping and Fucking, portraying an ex-heroin addict.

Hoffman took an unflattering role in Todd Solondz's Happiness (1998), a misanthropic black comedy about the lives of three sisters and those around them. He played Allen, a sexually frustrated loner who makes obscene phone calls to women; the character furiously masturbates during one conversation, producing what film scholar Jerry Mosher calls an "embarrassingly raw performance". Jake Coyle of the Associated Press rated Allen as "one of the creepiest characters in American movies", but critic Xan Brooks highlighted the pathos that Hoffman brought to the role. Happiness was controversial but widely praised, and Hoffman's role has been cited by critics as one of his best. His final 1998 release was more mainstream, appeared as a medical student in the Robin Williams comedy Patch Adams. The film was critically panned, but one of the highest-grossing of Hoffman's career.

In 1999, Hoffman starred opposite Robert De Niro as drag queen Rusty Zimmerman in Joel Schumacher's drama Flawless. Hoffman considered De Niro the most imposing actor with whom he had appeared, and he felt that working with the veteran performer profoundly improved his own acting. Hoffman's ability to avoid clichés in playing such a delicate role was noted by critics, and Roger Ebert said it confirmed him as "one of the best new character actors". He was rewarded with his first Screen Actors Guild Award nomination. Hoffman then reunited with Paul Thomas Anderson, where he was given an atypically virtuous role in the ensemble drama Magnolia. The film, set over one day in Los Angeles, features Hoffman as a nurse who cares for Jason Robards' character, who is dying of cancer. The performance was approved of by the medical industry, and Jessica Winter of the Village Voice considered it Hoffman's most indelible work, likening him to a guardian angel. Magnolia has been included in lists of the greatest films of all time, and it was a personal favorite of Hoffman's.

One of the most critically and commercially successful films of Hoffman's career was The Talented Mr. Ripley (1999), which he considered "as edgy as you can get for a Hollywood movie". He played a "preppy bully" who taunts Matt Damon's Tom Ripley in the thriller, a character which Jeff Simon of The Buffalo News called "the truest upper class twit in all of American movies". Hoffman's performance won praise from Meryl Streep, another of his cinematic idols: "I sat up straight in my seat and said, 'Who is that?' I thought to myself: My God, this actor is fearless", she said. "He's done what we all strive for — he's given this awful character the respect he deserves, and he's made him fascinating." In recognition of his work in Magnolia and The Talented Mr. Ripley, Hoffman was named the year's Best Supporting Actor by the National Board of Review.

=== 2000–2004: Established star ===
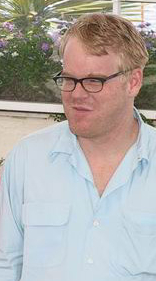
Hoffman at Cannes in 2002 promoting Punch-Drunk Love

Following a string of roles in successful films in the late 1990s, Hoffman had established a reputation as a top supporting player who could be relied on to make an impression with each performance. His film appearances were likened by David Kamp of GQ to "discovering a prize in a box of cereal, receiving a bonus, or bumping unexpectedly into an old friend". According to Jerry Mosher, as the year 2000 began, "it seemed Hoffman was everywhere, poised on the cusp of stardom".

Hoffman had begun to be recognized as a theater actor in 1999, when he received a Drama Desk Award nomination for Outstanding Featured Actor for the off-Broadway play The Author's Voice. This success continued with the 2000 Broadway revival of Sam Shepard's True West, where Hoffman alternated roles nightly with co-star John C. Reilly, (Note: John C. Reilly co-starred with Hoffman in Anderson's films Hard Eight, Boogie Nights, and Magnolia, and the pair were already well-acquainted with each other as actors.) making 154 appearances between March and July 2000. Ben Brantley of The New York Times felt that it was the best stage performance of Hoffman's career, calling him "brilliant", and the actor earned a Tony Award nomination for Best Actor in a Play. The following year, Hoffman appeared with Meryl Streep, Natalie Portman, and John Goodman in a Delacorte Theater production of Chekhov's The Seagull—although Brantley felt that this performance was less fully realized. As a stage director, Hoffman received two Drama Desk Award nominations for Outstanding Director of a Play: one for Jesus Hopped the 'A' Train in 2001, and another for Our Lady of 121st Street in 2003. In a 2008 interview, Hoffman opined that "switching hats" between acting and directing helped him improve in both roles.

David Mamet's comedy State and Main, about the difficulties of shooting a film in rural New England, was Hoffman's first film role of 2000 and had a limited release. He had a more prominent supporting role that year in Almost Famous, Cameron Crowe's popular coming-of-age film set in the 1970s music industry. Hoffman portrayed the enthusiastic rock critic Lester Bangs, a task by which he felt burdened, but he managed to convey the real figure's mannerisms and sharp wit after watching him in a BBC interview. The following year, Hoffman featured as the narrator and interviewer in The Party's Over, a documentary about the 2000 U.S. elections. He assumed the position of a "politically informed and alienated Generation-Xer" who seeks to be educated in U.S. politics, but ultimately reveals the extent of public dissatisfaction in this area.

In 2002, Hoffman was given his first leading role (despite joking at the time "Even if I was hired into a leading-man part, I'd probably turn it into the non-leading-man part") in Todd Louiso's tragicomedy Love Liza (2002). His brother Gordy wrote the script, which Hoffman had seen at their mother's house five years earlier, about a widower who starts sniffing gasoline to cope with his wife's suicide. He considered it the finest piece of writing he had ever read, "incredibly humble in its exploration of grief", but critics were less enthusiastic about the production. A review for the BBC wrote that Hoffman had finally been given a part that showed "what he's truly capable of", but few witnessed this as the film had a limited release and earned only US$210,000.

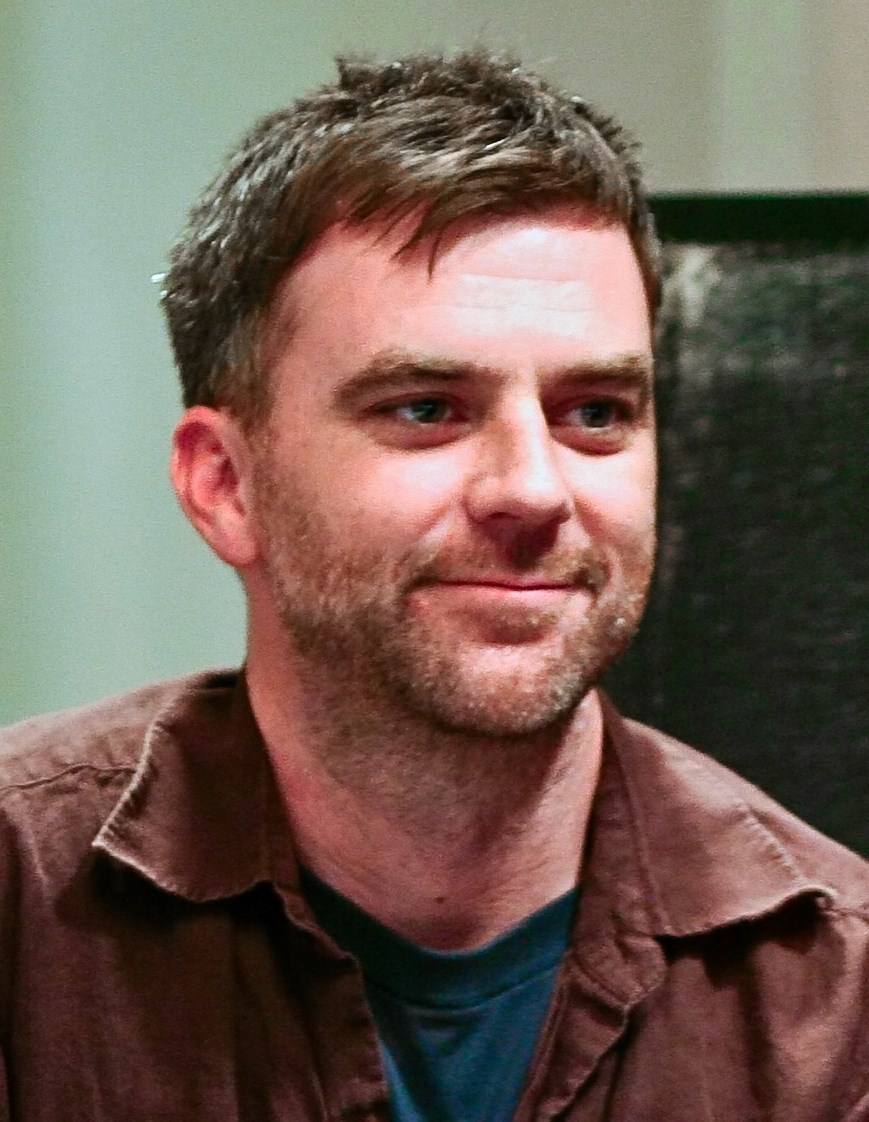
Director Paul Thomas Anderson, who cast Hoffman in five of his first six films

Later in 2002, Hoffman starred opposite Adam Sandler and Emily Watson in Anderson's critically acclaimed fourth picture, the surrealist romantic comedy-drama Punch-Drunk Love (2002), where he played an illegal phone-sex "supervisor". Drew Hunt of the Chicago Reader saw the performance as a fine example of Hoffman's "knack for turning small roles into seminal performances" and praised the actor's comedic ability. In a very different film, Hoffman was next seen with Anthony Hopkins in the high-budget thriller Red Dragon, a prequel to The Silence of the Lambs, portraying the meddlesome tabloid journalist Freddy Lounds. His fourth appearance of 2002 came in Spike Lee's drama 25th Hour, playing an English teacher who makes a devastating drunken mistake. Both Lee and the film's lead Edward Norton were thrilled to work with Hoffman, and Lee confessed that he had long wanted to do a picture with the actor, but had waited until he found the right role. Hoffman considered his character, Jakob, to be one of the most reticent characters he had ever played, a straight-laced "corduroy-pants-wearing kind of guy". Roger Ebert promoted 25th Hour to one of his "Great Movies" in 2009, and along with A. O. Scott, considered it to be one of the best films of the 2000s.

The drama Owning Mahowny (2003) gave Hoffman his second lead role, starring opposite Minnie Driver as a bank employee who embezzles money to feed his gambling addiction. It was based on the true story of Toronto banker Brian Molony, who committed the largest fraud in Canadian history. Hoffman met with Molony to prepare for the role and help him play the character as accurately as possible. He was determined not to conform to "movie character" stereotypes, and his portrayal of addiction won approval from the Royal College of Psychiatrists. Roger Ebert assessed Hoffman's performance as "a masterpiece of discipline and precision," but the film earned little at the box office.

Hoffman's second 2003 appearance was a small role in Anthony Minghella's successful Civil War epic Cold Mountain. He played an immoral preacher, a complex character that Hoffman described as a "mass of contradictions". The same year, from April to August, he appeared with Vanessa Redgrave, Brian Dennehy, and Robert Sean Leonard in a Broadway revival of Eugene O'Neill's Long Day's Journey into Night. Director Robert Falls later commented on the dedication and experience that Hoffman brought to his role of alcoholic Jamie Tyrone: "Every night he ripped it up to an extent that he couldn't leave [the role]. Phil carried it with him." Hoffman received his second Tony Award nomination, this time for Best Featured Actor in a Play. In 2004, he appeared as the crude, has-been actor friend of Ben Stiller's character in the box-office hit Along Came Polly. Reflecting on the role, People said it proved that "Hoffman could deliver comedic performances with the best of them".

=== 2005–2009: Critical acclaim ===
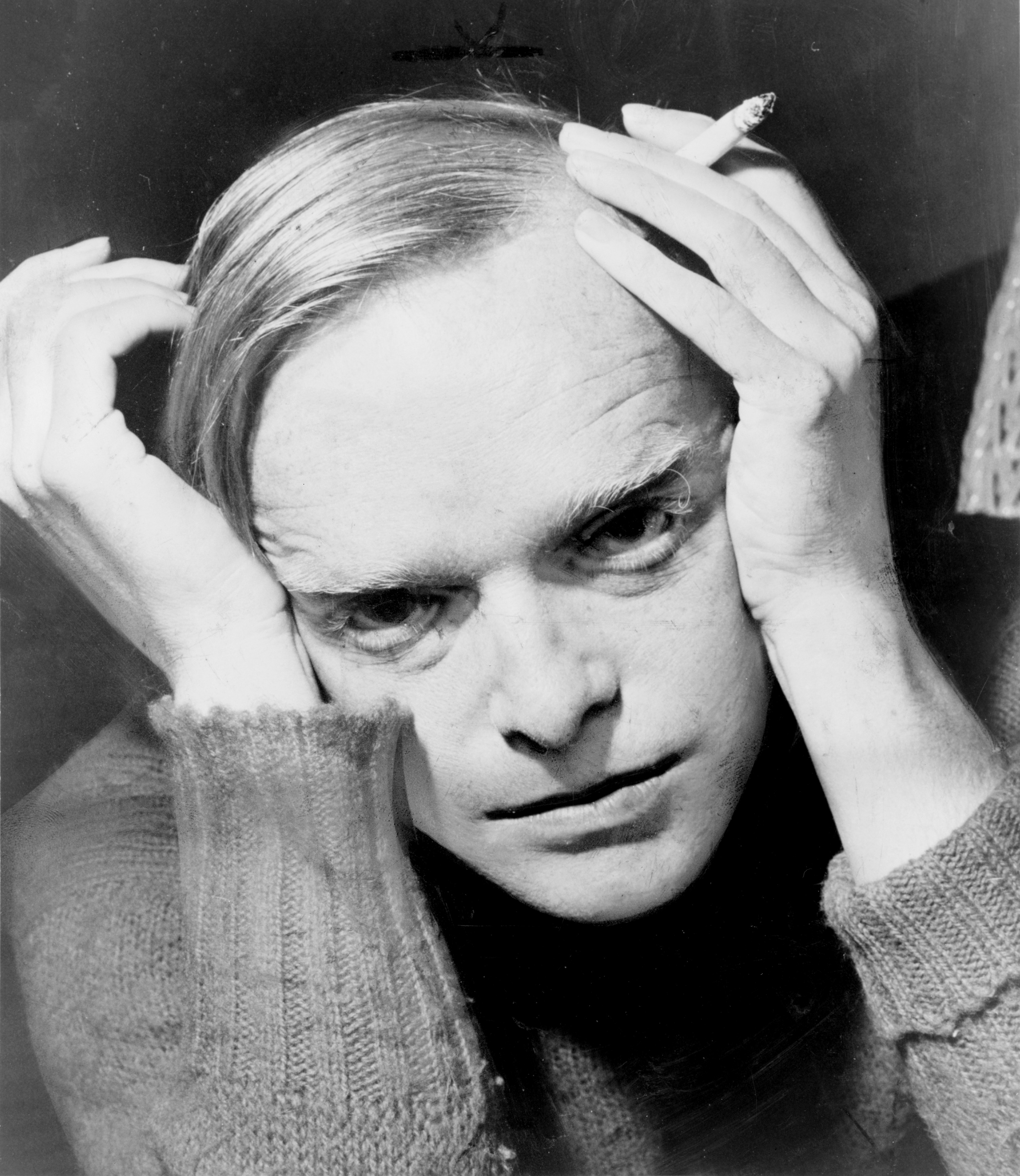
Hoffman won many awards for his portrayal of the writer Truman Capote in Capote (2005), including the Academy Award for Best Actor.

A turning point in Hoffman's career came with the biographical film Capote (2005), which dramatized Truman Capote's experience of writing his true crime novel In Cold Blood (1966). Hoffman took the title role for a project that he co-produced and helped bring to fruition. Portraying the idiosyncratic writer proved highly demanding, requiring significant weight loss and four months of research—such as watching video clips of Capote to help him affect the author's effeminate voice and mannerisms. Hoffman stated that he was not concerned with perfectly imitating Capote's speech, but he did feel a great duty to "express the vitality and the nuances" of the writer. During filming, he stayed in character constantly so as not to lose the voice and posture: "Otherwise", he explained, "I would give my body a chance to bail on me." Capote was released to great acclaim, particularly regarding Hoffman's performance. Many critics commented that the role was designed to win awards, and indeed Hoffman went on to receive numerous accolades, including an Academy Award, an Actor Award, a BAFTA Award, a Critics' Choice Movie Award, and a Golden Globe Award, all for Best Actor. In 2006, Premiere listed his role in Capote as the 35th-greatest movie performance of all time. After the film, several commentators began to describe Hoffman as one of the finest, most ambitious actors of his generation.

Hoffman received his only Primetime Emmy Award nomination for his supporting role in the HBO miniseries Empire Falls (2005), about life in a New England town. He ultimately lost to castmate Paul Newman. In 2006, he appeared in the summer blockbuster Mission: Impossible III, playing the villainous arms dealer Owen Davian opposite Tom Cruise. A journalist for Vanity Fair stated that Hoffman's "black-hat performance was one of the most delicious in a Hollywood film since Alan Rickman's in Die Hard ", and he was generally approved of for bringing gravitas to the action film. With a gross of nearly US$400 million, it exposed Hoffman to a mainstream audience.

Returning to independent films in 2007, Hoffman began with a starring role in Tamara Jenkins's The Savages, where Laura Linney and he played siblings responsible for putting their dementia-ridden father (Philip Bosco) in a care home. Jake Coyle of the Associated Press stated that it was "the epitome of a Hoffman film: a mix of comedy and tragedy told with subtlety, bone-dry humor, and flashes of grace". Hoffman received a Golden Globe nomination for his performance in The Savages. He next appeared in Before the Devil Knows You're Dead, the final film by veteran director Sidney Lumet, where he played a realtor who embezzles funds from his employer to support his drug habit. Mosher comments that the character was one of the most unpleasant of Hoffman's career, but that his "fearlessness again revealed the humanity within a deeply flawed character" as he appeared naked in the opening sex scene. The film was received positively by critics as a powerful and affecting thriller.

Mike Nichols's political film Charlie Wilson's War (2007) gave Hoffman his second Academy Award nomination, again for playing a real individual—Gust Avrakotos, the CIA officer who worked with Congressman Charlie Wilson (played by Tom Hanks) to aid the Afghan Mujahideen in their fight against the Soviet Union. Todd McCarthy wrote of Hoffman's performance: "Decked out with a pouffy '80s hairdo, moustache, protruding gut and ever-present smokes ... whenever he's on, the picture vibrates with conspiratorial electricity." The film was a critical and commercial success, and along with his Oscar nomination for Best Supporting Actor, Hoffman was nominated for a BAFTA and a Golden Globe Award.

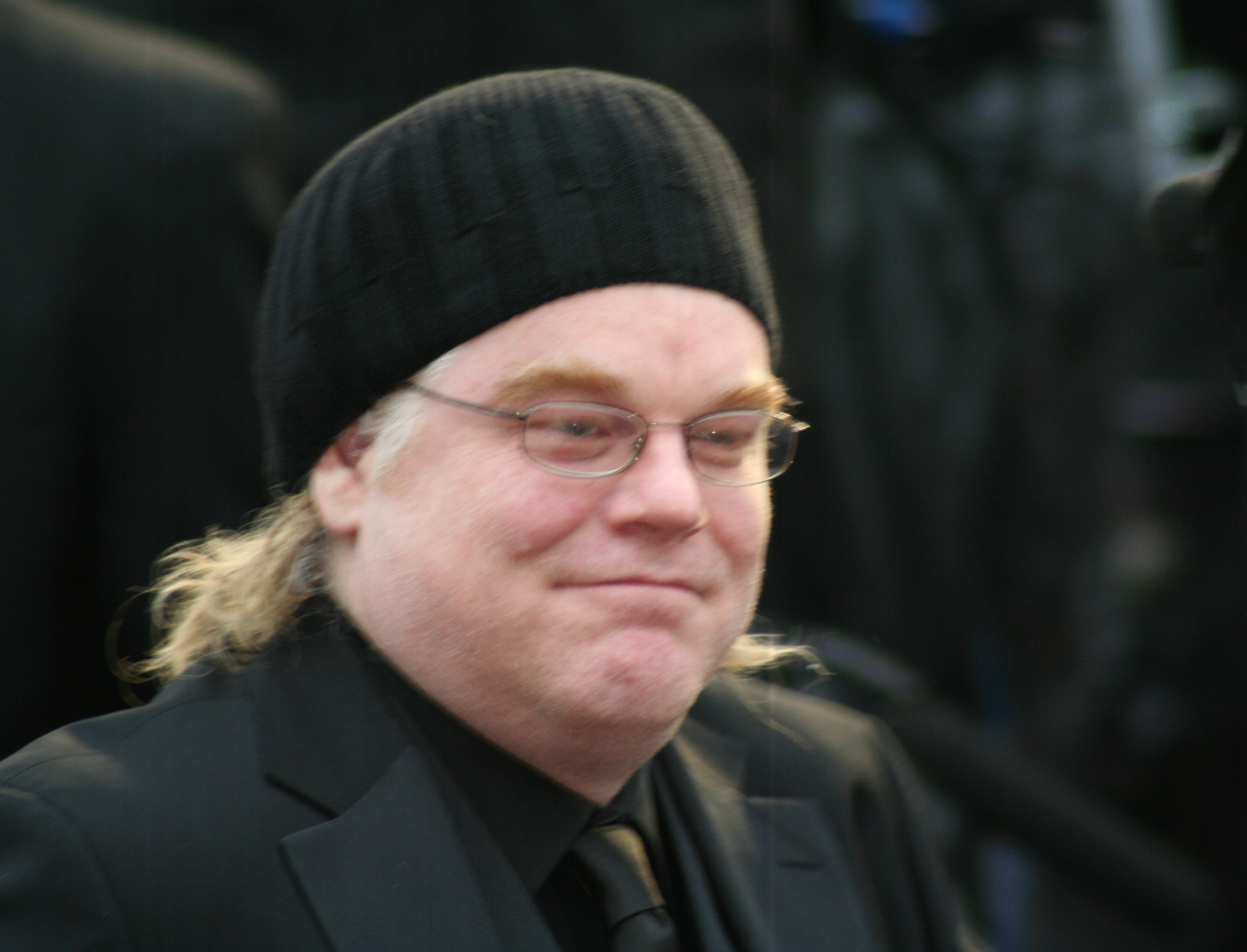
Hoffman at the 81st Academy Awards in February 2009, where he was nominated for Doubt

The year 2008 contained two significant Hoffman roles. In Charlie Kaufman's enigmatic drama Synecdoche, New York, he starred as Caden Cotard, a frustrated dramatist who attempts to build a scale replica of New York inside a warehouse for a play. Hoffman again showed his willingness to reveal unattractive traits, as the character ages and deteriorates, and committed to a deeply psychological role. Critics were divided in their response to the "ambitious and baffling" film. Sonny Bunch of The Washington Times found it "impressionistic, inaccessible, and endlessly frustrating", likening Hoffman's character to "God, if God lacked imagination". Conversely, Roger Ebert named it the best film of the decade and considered it one of the greatest of all time, and Robbie Collin, film critic for The Daily Telegraph, believes Hoffman gave one of cinema's best performances.

Hoffman's second role of the year came opposite Meryl Streep and Amy Adams in John Patrick Shanley's Doubt, where he played Father Brendan Flynn—a priest accused of sexually abusing a 12-year-old African-American student in the 1960s. Hoffman was already familiar with the play and appreciated the opportunity to bring it to the screen; in preparing for the role, he talked extensively to a priest who lived through the era. The film had a mixed reception, with some critics such as Peter Bradshaw of The Guardian suspicious of it as Oscar bait, but Hoffman gained second consecutive Best Supporting Actor nominations at the Oscars, BAFTAs, and Golden Globes, and was also nominated by the Screen Actors Guild.

On stage in 2009, Hoffman played Iago in Peter Sellars' futuristic production of Othello (with the title role by John Ortiz), which received mixed reviews. Ben Brantley, theatre critic of The New York Times, found it to be "exasperatingly misconceived", remarking that even when Hoffman is attempting to "manipulate others into self-destruction, he comes close to spoiling everything by erupting into genuine, volcanic fury". Hoffman also did his first vocal performance for the claymation film Mary and Max, although the film did not initially have an American release. He played Max, a reclusive New Yorker with Asperger syndrome, while Toni Collette voiced Mary—the Australian girl who becomes his pen pal. Continuing with animation, Hoffman then worked on an episode of the children's show Arthur and received a Daytime Emmy Award nomination for Outstanding Performer In An Animated Program. Later in the year, he played a brash American disc jockey opposite Bill Nighy and Rhys Ifans in Richard Curtis's British comedy The Boat That Rocked (also known as Pirate Radio)—a character based on Emperor Rosko, a host of Radio Caroline in 1966. He also had a cameo role as a bartender in Ricky Gervais's The Invention of Lying.

Reflecting on Hoffman's work in the late 2000s, Mosher writes that the actor remained impressive, but had not delivered a testing performance on the level of his work in Capote. The film critic David Thomson believed that Hoffman showed indecisiveness at this time, unsure whether to play spectacular supporting roles or become a lead actor who is capable of controlling the emotional dynamic and outcome of a film.

=== 2010–2014: Final years ===
Hoffman's profile continued to grow with the new decade, and he became an increasingly recognizable figure. Despite earlier reservations about directing for the screen, his first release of the 2010s was also his first as a film director. The independent drama Jack Goes Boating was adapted from Robert Glaudini's play of the same name, which Hoffman had starred in and directed for the LAByrinth Theater Company in 2007. He originally intended to only direct the film, but decided to reprise the main role of Jack—a lonely limousine driver looking for love—after the actor he wanted for it was unavailable. The low-key film had a limited release, and was not a high earner, though it received many positive reviews. However, Dave Edwards of the Daily Mirror remarked that "Hoffman's directing debut delivers a film so weak I could barely remember what it was about as I left", while critic Mark Kermode appreciated the cinematic qualities that Hoffman brought to the film, and stated that he showed potential as a director. In addition to Jack Goes Boating, in 2010 Hoffman also directed Brett C. Leonard's tragic drama The Long Red Road for the Goodman Theatre in Chicago. Steven Oxman of Variety described the production as "heavy handed" and "predictable", but "intriguing and at least partially successful".

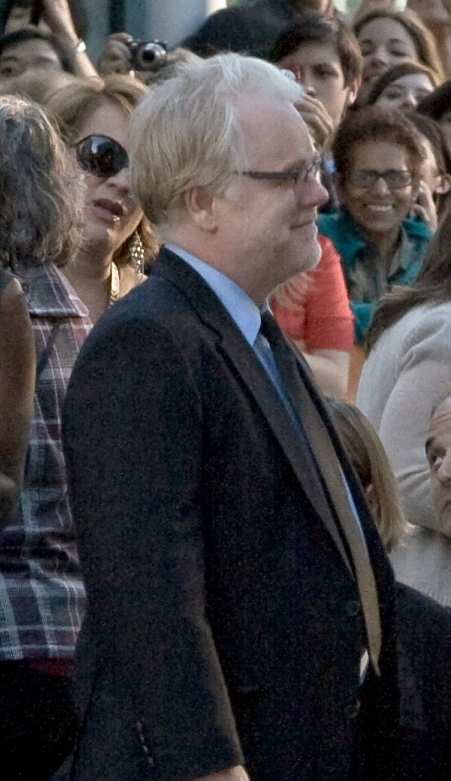
Hoffman at the Moneyball premiere in September 2011

Hoffman next had significant supporting roles in two films, both released in the last third of 2011. In Bennett Miller's Moneyball, a sports drama about the 2002 season of the Oakland Athletics baseball team, he played the manager Art Howe. The film was a critical and commercial success, and Hoffman was described as "perfectly cast" by Ann Hornaday of The Washington Post, but the real-life Art Howe accused the filmmakers of giving an "unfair and untrue" portrayal of him. Hoffman's second film of the year was George Clooney's political drama The Ides of March, in which he played the earnest campaign manager to the Democratic presidential candidate Mike Morris (Clooney). The film was well-received and Hoffman's performance, especially in the scenes opposite Paul Giamatti—who played the rival campaign manager—was positively noted. Hoffman's work on the film earned him his fourth BAFTA Award nomination.

In the spring of 2012, Hoffman made his final stage appearance, starring as Willy Loman in a Broadway revival of Death of a Salesman opposite Andrew Garfield. Directed by Mike Nichols, the production ran for 78 performances and was the highest-grossing show in the Ethel Barrymore Theatre's history. Many critics felt that Hoffman, at 44, was too young for the role of 62-year-old Loman, and Chris Jones of the Chicago Tribune felt that the character had been interpreted poorly. Hoffman admitted that he found the role difficult, but he nevertheless earned his third Tony Award nomination.

Hoffman collaborated with Paul Thomas Anderson for the fifth time in The Master (2012), where he turned in what critic Peter Bradshaw considered the most memorable performance of his career. Set in 1950s America, the film featured Hoffman as Lancaster Dodd, the charismatic leader of a nascent Scientology-type movement who brings a troubled man (Joaquin Phoenix) under his tutelage. Hoffman was instrumental in the project's development, having been involved with it for three years. He assisted Anderson in the writing of the script by reviewing samples of it, and suggested making Phoenix's character, Freddie Quell, the protagonist instead of Dodd. A talented dancer, Hoffman was able to showcase his abilities by performing a jig during a surreal sequence; Bradshaw called it an "extraordinary moment" that "only Hoffman could have carried off". The Master was praised as an intelligent and challenging drama, and Drew Hunt of the Chicago Reader also felt that it contained Hoffman's finest work: "He's inscrutable yet welcoming, intimidating yet charismatic, villainous yet fatherly. He epitomizes so many things at once that it's impossible to think of [Dodd] as mere movie character". Hoffman and Phoenix received a joint Volpi Cup Award at the Venice Film Festival for their performances, and Hoffman was also nominated for an Academy Award, a Golden Globe, a BAFTA Award and a SAG Award for the supporting role.

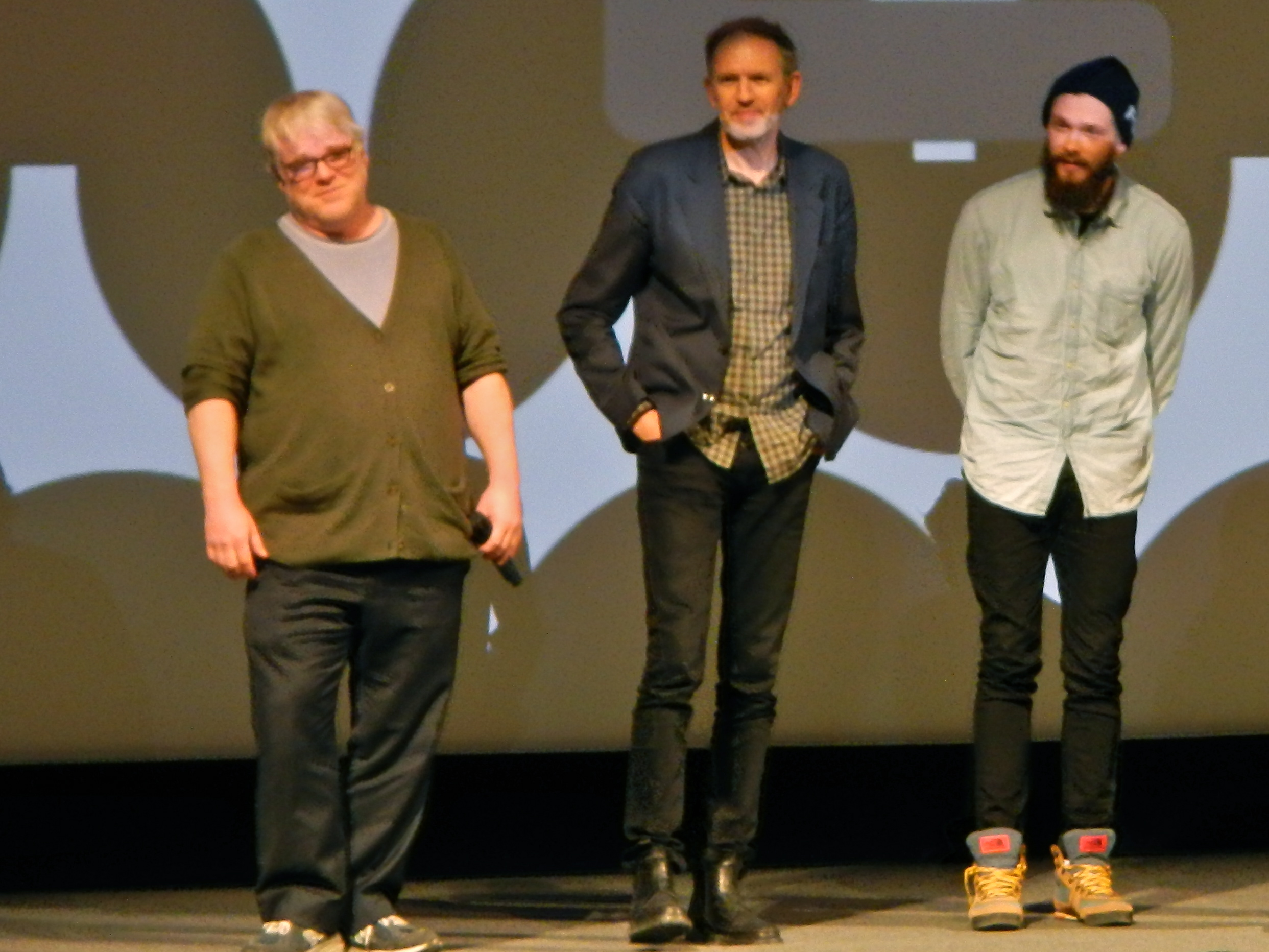
Hoffman, Anton Corbijn and Grigoriy Dobrygin promoting A Most Wanted Man at the Sundance Film Festival on January 19, 2014, less than two weeks before his death

A Late Quartet was Hoffman's other film release of 2012, where he played a violinist in a string quartet whose members (played by Christopher Walken, Catherine Keener, and Mark Ivanir) face a crisis when one is diagnosed with Parkinson's disease. The drama received favorable reviews, and Stephen Holden of The New York Times called Hoffman's performance "exceptional". In 2013, Hoffman joined the popular Hunger Games series in its second film, The Hunger Games: Catching Fire, where he played gamemaker Plutarch Heavensbee. The film finished as the 10th-highest grossing in history to that point, and Hoffman became recognizable to a new generation of film-goers. In January 2014, shortly before his death, he attended the Sundance Film Festival to promote two films. In Anton Corbijn's A Most Wanted Man, a thriller based on John le Carré's novel, Hoffman played a German intelligence officer. His performance was praised by Xan Brooks as one of "terrific, lip-smacking relish: full of mischief, anchored by integrity". The other was God's Pocket, the directorial debut of actor John Slattery, in which Hoffman played a thief. In November 2014, nine months after his death, The Hunger Games: Mockingjay – Part 1, was released, in which he had a major role. It was dedicated in his memory.

At the time of his death, Hoffman was filming The Hunger Games: Mockingjay – Part 2, the fourth film in the series, and had already completed the majority of his scenes. His two remaining scenes were rewritten to compensate for his absence. The film was released in November 2015. Hoffman was also preparing for his second directorial effort, a Prohibition-era drama titled Ezekiel Moss, which was to star Amy Adams and Jake Gyllenhaal. In addition, he had filmed a pilot episode for the Showtime series Happyish, in which he played the lead role of an advertising executive. Plans for a full season were put on hold following his death. Steve Coogan was recast in the role.

== Personal life ==
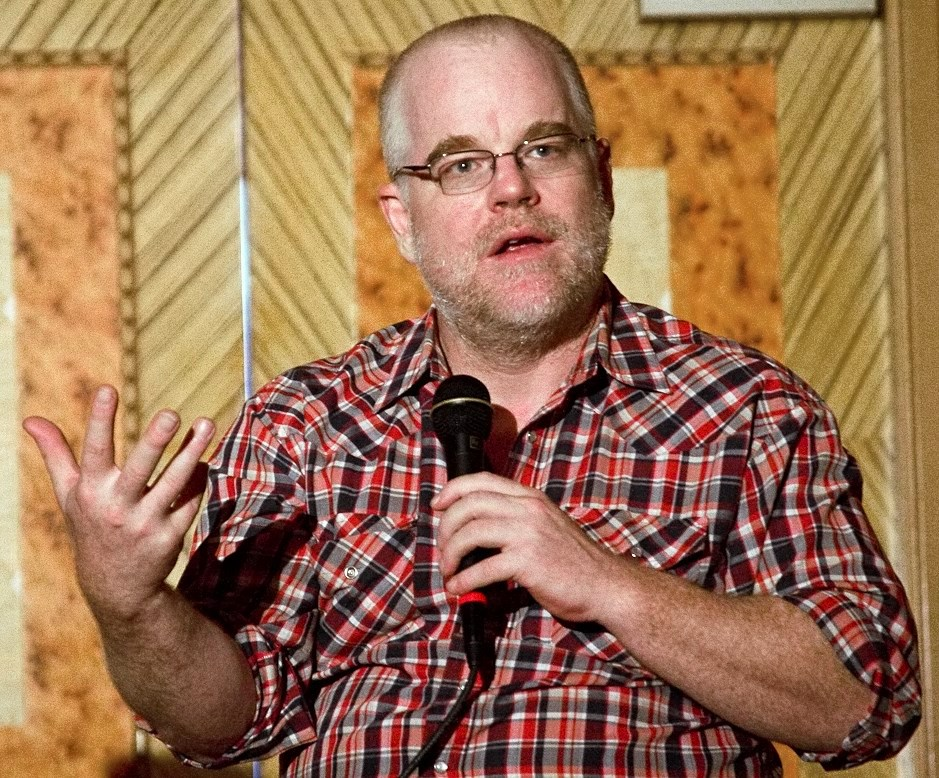
Hoffman at a Hudson Union Society event in September 2010

Hoffman rarely mentioned his personal life in interviews, stating in 2012 that he would "rather not because my family doesn't have any choice. If I talk about them in the press, I'm giving them no choice. So I choose not to." For 14 years, he was in a relationship with costume designer Mimi O'Donnell, whom he had met in 1999 when they were both working on the Hoffman-directed play In Arabia We'd All Be Kings. They lived in New York City and had a son, Cooper, and two daughters. While some reports stated Hoffman and O'Donnell separated in late 2013, O'Donnell later said she and Hoffman were both committed to their relationship, but he had moved out of their longtime residence to a nearby apartment to protect their children from the effects of his relapse into substance abuse.

Hoffman felt that keeping his personal life private was beneficial to his career: "The less you know about me the more interesting it will be to watch me do what I do". Hoffman was also discreet about his religious and political beliefs, but it is known that he voted for the Green Party candidate Ralph Nader in the 2000 presidential election. He also donated to Al Franken's U.S. Senate campaign and to the Democratic National Committee. Hoffman was the godfather of Morris Katz, who became a political strategist.

In a 2006 interview with 60 Minutes, Hoffman revealed he had engaged in drug and alcohol misuse during his time at New York University, saying he had used "anything I could get my hands on. I liked it all." Following his college graduation in 1989, he entered a drug rehabilitation program and remained sober for 23 years. However, he relapsed in 2012 and admitted himself to drug rehabilitation for about 10 days in May 2013.

== Death and tributes ==
On February 2, 2014, Hoffman was found dead in the bathroom of his Manhattan apartment by his friend, playwright and screenwriter David Bar Katz. He was 46 years old. Although friends stated that Hoffman's drug use was under control at the time, detectives searching the apartment found heroin and prescription medication at the scene and revealed that he had a syringe in his arm. Hoffman's death was officially ruled an accident caused by "acute mixed drug intoxication, including heroin, cocaine, benzodiazepines, and amphetamine". Michael Schwirtz of The New York Times said, "Whether Hoffman had taken all of the substances on the same day, or whether any of the substances had remained in his system from earlier use, was not reported."

Hoffman's funeral Mass was held at St. Ignatius Loyola Church in Manhattan on February 7, 2014. After the Mass, Hoffman's body was taken to be cremated, with his ashes given to his partner and children. He left his fortune of around $35 million to Mimi O'Donnell in his October 2004 will, trusting her to distribute money to their children.

Hoffman's death was lamented by fans and the film industry and was described by several commentators as a considerable loss to the profession. On February 5, 2014, the LAByrinth Theatre Company honored his memory by holding a candlelight vigil, and Broadway dimmed its lights for one minute.

Three weeks after Hoffman's death, Katz established the American Playwriting Foundation in Hoffman's memory. With the money received from a libel lawsuit against the National Enquirer which inaccurately claimed that Hoffman and Katz were lovers, the foundation awards an annual prize of $45,000 to the author of an unproduced play. Katz named this the "Relentless Prize" in honor of Hoffman's dedication to the profession. He would later remember Hoffman with a poem published in The Guardian in December 2014.

In tribute, actress Cate Blanchett dedicated her BAFTA trophy to Hoffman when she won the Best Actress for Blue Jasmine on February 16. Years later, at the 90th Academy Awards, Three Billboards Outside Ebbing, Missouri actor Sam Rockwell dedicated his win for Best Supporting Actor to Hoffman.

== Reception and acting style ==
Hoffman was held in high regard within both the film and theater industries, and he was often cited in the media as one of the finest actors of his generation. In a 2022 readers' poll by Empire magazine, he was voted one of the 50 greatest actors of all time. One writer described Hoffman as "too pudgy to look romantic or heroic"; however, the actor said he was grateful for his appearance, as it made him believable in a wide range of roles. Joel Schumacher once said of him in 2000, "The bad news is that Philip won't be a $25-million star. The good news is that he'll work for the rest of his life". The Aiken Standard of South Carolina referred to him as an "anti-star", whose real identity remained "amorphous and unmoored". Hoffman was acutely aware that he was often too unorthodox for the Academy voters. He remarked, "I'm sure that people in the big corporations that run Hollywood don't know quite what to do with someone like me, but that's OK. I think there are other people who are interested in what I do."

Most of Hoffman's notable roles came in independent films, including particularly original ones, but he also featured in several Hollywood blockbusters. He generally played supporting roles, appearing in both dramas and comedies, but was noted for his ability to make small parts memorable. Peter Bradshaw, film critic for The Guardian, felt that "Almost every single one of his credits had something special about it". David Fear of Rolling Stone wrote that Hoffman "added heft to low-budget art films, and nuance and unpredictability to blockbuster franchises. He was a transformative performer who worked from the inside out, blessed with an emotional transparency that could be overwhelming, invigorating, compelling, devastating."

Hoffman was praised for his versatility and ability to fully inhabit any role, but specialized in playing creeps and misfits: "his CV was populated almost exclusively by snivelling wretches, insufferable prigs, braggarts and outright bullies" writes the journalist Ryan Gilbey. Hoffman was appreciated for making these roles real, complex and even sympathetic; while Todd Louiso, director of Love Liza, believed that Hoffman connected to people on screen because he looked like an ordinary man and revealed his vulnerability. Xan Brooks of The Guardian remarked that the actor's particular talent was to "take thwarted, twisted humanity and ennoble it". "The more pathetic or deluded the character," writes Gilbey, "the greater Hoffman's relish seemed in rescuing them from the realms of the merely monstrous." When asked in 2006 why he undertook such roles, Hoffman responded, "I didn't go out looking for negative characters; I went out looking for people who have a struggle and a fight to tackle. That's what interests me."

=== Work ethic ===
The journalist Jeff Simon described Hoffman as "probably the most in-demand character actor of his generation", but Hoffman said he never took it for granted that he would be offered roles. Although he worked hard and regularly, he was humble about his acting success: an anecdote went that when asked by a friend in the early 2000s if he was having any luck in his career, he quietly replied, "I'm in a film, Cold Mountain, that has just come out." Patrick Fugit, who worked with Hoffman on Almost Famous, recalled the actor was intimidating but an exceptional mentor and influence in "a school-of-hard-knocks way", remarking that "there was a certain weight that came with him". Hoffman admitted that he sometimes appeared in big-budget studio films for the money, but said, "ultimately my main goal is to do good work. If it doesn't pay well, so be it." He kept himself grounded and invigorated as an actor by attempting to appear on stage once a year.

Hoffman occasionally changed his hair and lost or gained weight for parts, and he went to great lengths to reveal the worst in his characters. But in a 2012 interview, he confessed that performing to a high standard was a challenge: "The job isn't difficult. Doing it well is difficult." In an earlier interview with The New York Times, he explained how deeply he loved acting but added, "that deep kind of love comes at a price: for me, acting is torturous, and it's torturous because you know it's a beautiful thing ... Wanting it is easy, but trying to be great—well, that's absolutely torturous." This struggle was confirmed by the author John le Carré, who met Hoffman during the adaptation of his novel A Most Wanted Man. While praising the actor's intelligence and intuition, le Carré acknowledged the burden that Hoffman felt: "It was painful and exhausting work, and probably in the end his undoing. The world was too bright for him to handle."

== Acting credits and accolades ==
Hoffman appeared in 55 films and one miniseries during his screen career spanning 22 years. He won the Academy Award for Best Actor for Capote (2005), and was nominated three times for Best Supporting Actor for Charlie Wilson's War (2007), Doubt (2008), and The Master (2012). He also received five Golden Globe Award nominations (winning one), five BAFTA Award nominations (winning one), four Actor Awards (winning one), and won the Volpi Cup at the Venice Film Festival. Hoffman remained active in theater throughout his career, starring in 10 and directing 19 stage productions (predominantly in New York). He received three Tony Award nominations for his Broadway performances: two for Best Leading Actor, in True West (2000) and Death of a Salesman (2012), and one for Best Featured Actor in Long Day's Journey into Night (2003).

In 2022, a statue of Hoffman was unveiled in his hometown of Fairport, New York. The statue was sculpted by David A. Annand and commissioned by James Declan Tobin, a film producer who befriended Hoffman's mother at the 2015 Sundance Film Festival. Originally on loan from a gallery in New York City, the statue was permanently installed outside the George Eastman Museum in 2023. Hoffman's mother, Marilyn O'Connor, called the sculpture "a loving memorial" to her son.

== See also ==
- List of actors with Academy Award nominations
- List of actors with more than one Academy Award nomination in the acting categories
- List of Golden Globe winners
