= Brian Molony =

Canadian compulsive gambler

- Education: University of Western Ontario
- Occupation: Business consultant
- Known for: Embezzling from the Canadian Imperial Bank of Commerce

Brian Molony is a Canadian self-admitted former compulsive gambler from Toronto, known for embezzling millions from the Canadian Imperial Bank of Commerce (CIBC), the second-largest bank in Canada.

== Early life and education ==
Molony developed a passion for the race track and gambling from the age of ten, and acted as a bookie for his schoolmates. He graduated from the University of Western Ontario with a degree in journalism.

== CIBC career and embezzlement ==
Initially planning to be a financial writer, he did so well in a Canadian Imperial Bank of Commerce (CIBC) aptitude test that he was put in their management-training program and hired right out of university. Molony spent a few weeks as a teller, before working in savings, current accounts, foreign exchange and loan accounting, then "floating" among some of the bank's network of about 1,600 branches, which gave him a further exposure to the bank's inner workings.

At the same time, he was embezzling $10.2 million from CIBC to feed his gambling habit, writing loans in the names of both real and fictitious companies. Molony was then able to transfer millions of dollars out of the bank through a company called California Clearing Corp., a wholly owned subsidiary of Desert Palace, a Las Vegas casino. This corporation's only purpose was to let people deposit sums of money into the casino without detection.

Molony was arrested on April 27, 1982, the day after he lost a million dollars at the tables at Caesars Atlantic City Hotel-Casino. Caesars claimed that it never asked Molony for personal or credit information, yet admitted in court to supplying him with tens of thousands of dollars' worth of hotel rooms and a private Learjet to travel to and from Las Vegas and Atlantic City.

Molony pleaded guilty to embezzlement in November 1983, and served two and a half years in prison, although some sources claim that he served six years. On release, he agreed to a program of restitution and community service, which includes public speaking about the compulsion of gambling. Molony is now married with children, and works as a business consultant.

A federal lawsuit, filed by the CIBC in 1982, contended that Caesars officials induced Molony to gamble even though they knew—or should have known—that the money could not possibly have been his. CIBC's counsel initially stated that he hoped to recover some $4,732,000 that Molony lost at Caesars from February 7, 1981, to April 23, 1982; the terms of the settlement are private. As part of an agreement between the casino and the state Division of Gaming Enforcement, Caesars was forced to close for a day on November 30, the Saturday after Thanksgiving, as a disciplinary measure. The New Jersey Casino Control Commission also levied $36,500 in fines against six Caesars employees. Industry analysts estimated that the casino stood to lose between $700,000 and $800,000 because of the shutdown.

== In media ==
Gary Stephen Ross's non-fiction book Stung: The Incredible Obsession of Brian Molony chronicles Molony's 18 months of increasingly brazen fraud and out-of-control gambling. In the film Owning Mahowny, based on Ross's book, Philip Seymour Hoffman played Dan Mahowny, a character based on Molony.
