= Hello I Must Be Going (2012 film) =

2012 film by Todd Louiso

- Theatrical release poster
- Directed by: Todd Louiso
- Written by: Sarah Koskoff
- Produced by: Hans Ritter; Mary Jane Skalski
- Starring: Melanie Lynskey; Christopher Abbott; Blythe Danner; John Rubinstein
- Cinematography: Julie Kirkwood
- Edited by: Tom McArdle
- Music by: Laura Veirs
- Production companies: Skyscraper Content; Union Entertainment Group
- Distributed by: Oscilloscope Pictures
- Release dates: January 19, 2012 (Sundance); September 7, 2012 (United States)
- Running time: 95 minutes
- Country: United States
- Language: English
- Box office: $354,939

Hello I Must Be Going is a 2012 American independent romantic dramedy film. Directed by Todd Louiso, it stars Melanie Lynskey, Christopher Abbott, Blythe Danner, and John Rubinstein. The film had its world premiere at the 2012 Sundance Film Festival, and was released theatrically in the United States on September 7, 2012, receiving positive reviews. The title is a reference to a song from the Marx Brothers' film Animal Crackers.

The film represented a career breakthrough for Lynskey, whose previous work consisted mainly of supporting roles.

== Plot ==
Following her breakup with and imminent divorce from her entertainment lawyer husband David, thirty-something Amy Minsky is forced to move back in with her upper middle-class parents Ruth and Stan in Westport, Connecticut. Amy, who is depressed and out of work, spends most of her days in the house, directionless and watching Marx Brothers films. She rejects everybody else's so-called "advice" to turn her life around, but upon the insistence of her mother, she attends a dinner that her family is hosting for friends Gwen and Larry Hammer. Stan, a lawyer, is hoping to take on Larry as a potential client, of which the financial windfall would allow him to retire and travel around the world with Ruth, which she has long looked forward to. The Hammers bring their son Jeremy, a 19-year-old actor, to the dinner.

During the dinner, conversation becomes awkward when Amy is questioned about her career prospects and Jeremy's work on a children's TV show is brought up. She admits she only has a liberal arts degree and abandoned her master's degree studies in photography to marry David. When Ruth makes an uncomfortable comment about Amy's chubbiness as a kid, Amy excuses herself from the dinner table and goes out to a part of the house that's being renovated to be alone. Jeremy follows her and kisses her, and the two embark on an affair, which they keep hidden due to the age difference and their families' respective business entanglements. Amy hides the affair by claiming to her parents that she is simply going to pick up antidepressants at the drugstore whenever she goes out at night. Jeremy's therapist mother Gwen mistakenly believes her son is gay, a front that he is happy to keep up. The affair gradually helps restore Amy's sense of self, and also pushes Jeremy to abandon his acting career, which he does not enjoy and only did as a way to make Gwen happy.

The relationship experiences tension when Jeremy expresses he has developed real feelings for Amy, and Amy chastises him and his unrealistic expectations for a possible future together. She explains she does not want to jeopardize her father's chance at retirement, which Jeremy interprets as her willingness to simply go along with what everyone else wants. To appease her family, Amy goes on a date with Phil, a fellow recent divorcee, but she finds the date unsatisfying. Later, Amy goes to New York City for a lunch with David to work out their divorce proceedings. Amy has not asked for anything in the divorce settlement because she was blindsided by the split, a result of David's affair with a colleague. The meeting starts off amicably, but when David smugly explains why the marriage failed, Amy states that she has now realized the marriage wasn't as happy as she thought. She leaves the table, asks to be compensated in the settlement, and thanks David for divorcing her because she would not have had the confidence to do it herself.

Stan is able to secure a business deal with Larry, and the family throws a party at their home in celebration. The Hammers bring along Jeremy, who refuses to talk to Amy after their argument. In the renovation area, Amy confronts Jeremy to apologize and admits she has genuine feelings for him. The couple reconcile and start to have sex on a couch, but they are embarrassingly caught in the act by their parents. Some time later, Ruth is distraught because Stan ultimately decided not to retire, as he never truly wanted to leave his job. Amy reassures her about the scuttled plans to travel the world. Amy tells Stan that she plans on moving out of the house once she's able to find a place. She goes to Jeremy's house to see him off as he is heading to Oberlin College. The two agree to stay friendly and Amy confides to Jeremy that she is resuming work on her Master's thesis and will be traveling the world with her mom. The film ends with Amy driving away in a taxi, now in a better place mentally.

== Cast ==
- Melanie Lynskey as Amy Minsky
- Blythe Danner as Ruth Minsky
- Christopher Abbott as Jeremy Hammer
- John Rubinstein as Stan Minsky
- Dan Futterman as David
- Julie White as Gwen Hammer
- Sara Chase as Missy Minsky
- Daniel Eric Gold as Noah Minsky
- Meera Simhan as Karen
- Damian Young as Larry
- Tori Feinstein as Caley Minsky
- Jimmi Simpson as Phil Bauer
- Greta Lee as Gap Employee
- Andrea Bordeaux as Hostess

== Production ==
=== Casting ===
Speaking of his decision to cast Melanie Lynskey in the lead role, Todd Louiso said, "I knew if I cast her, the film had the potential to resonate on a thousand different levels". After Lynskey's audition, "there was no one else".

=== Filming ===
Filming took place primarily in Westport, Connecticut in August 2011. The shoot lasted 20 days.

== Reception ==
The film received positive reviews from critics. It holds a 75% rating on Rotten Tomatoes, based on 51 reviews, with the site's consensus stating: "Hello I Must Be Going offers an offbeat twist to the romance genre, a solid character study for fans of grown-up drama, and a career-making breakout vehicle for Melanie Lynskey". Metacritic, which uses a weighted average, assigned the film a score of 62 out of 100 based on 23 critics, indicating "generally favorable" reviews.

Claudia Puig of USA Today called it "a funny, well-written, involving and emotionally honest tale". Particular praise was given to Lynskey, with The Seattle Times' Moira Macdonald describing her portrayal of Amy as "a master class in acting". Writing for The Washington Post, Michael O'Sullivan commented that "[the film] succeeds almost entirely on the strength of Lynskey's heartfelt and humorous performance", while Kenneth Turan of the Los Angeles Times noted, "Lynskey inhabits the role so completely, brings such exquisite naturalness to [it], that she becomes someone we root for unreservedly".

== Awards ==
Hello I Must Be Going was nominated for the Grand Jury Prize in the U.S. Dramatic Competition at the 2012 Sundance Film Festival, and was named one of the Top Ten Independent Films of 2012 by the National Board of Review. Lynskey received a nomination for Breakthrough Actor at the 2012 Gotham Awards.

== Soundtrack ==
The film's soundtrack was released on September 11, 2012. It features instrumental and vocal material by American singer/songwriter Laura Veirs.

1. "I Can See Your Tracks" – 3:06
2. "The Fox" – 2:14
3. "Where Are You Driving" – 2:53
4. "Little Lap Dog Lullaby" – 2:05
5. "July Flame" – 4:18
6. "Make Something Good" – 4:14
7. "Tumblebee" – 2:36
8. "Drink Deep" – 4:36
9. "Prairie Dream" – 1:21
10. "Carol Kaye" – 2:48
11. "Song My Friends Taught Me" – 4:32
12. "Little Deschutes" – 4:07
13. "Silo Song" – 2:38
14. "Spring Song" – 3:41
