= Todd Louiso =

American actor and director

- Occupations: Actor, director
- Years active: 1984–present
- Spouse: Sarah Koskoff

Todd Louiso is an American actor and director. He is best known for his role as timid record store clerk Dick in High Fidelity, opposite Jack Black and John Cusack.

== Career ==
Louiso directed his first film in 2002, Love Liza with Philip Seymour Hoffman. He has had supporting roles in films like The Rock, Apollo 13, Jerry Maguire, Scent of a Woman and Thank You for Smoking.

In 2012, his film Hello I Must Be Going was selected as the opening night film of the Sundance Film Festival. His adaptation of Macbeth, written along with his brother-in-law Jacob Koskoff, was released in 2015 as a feature film starring Michael Fassbender and Marion Cotillard.

== Personal life ==
Louiso is married to screenwriter Sarah Koskoff, who wrote the script for Hello I Must Be Going.

== Filmography ==
Film credits
Year	Title	Role	Notes
1990	Stella	Preppy Boy # 1	
1991	Billy Bathgate	Bell Boy at Racetrack	
1992	Scent of a Woman	Trent Potter	
1995	The Fifteen Minute Hamlet	Ophelia	also director
1995	Apollo 13	FAO White	
1996	The Rock	Marvin Isherwood	
1996	Jerry Maguire	Chad the Nanny	
1997	8 Heads in a Duffel Bag	Steve	
1998	A Cool, Dry Place	Bob Harper	
2000	High Fidelity	Dick	
2001	The Cutting Room	Jason	Short
2005	xXx: State of the Union	Dickie Ambrose	Uncredited
2005	Thank You for Smoking	Ron Goode	
2006	Snakes on a Plane	Dr. Steven Price	
2006	School for Scoundrels	Eli	
2007	Meet Bill	John Jr.	
2010	The Switch	Artie	
2011	A Bag of Hammers	Marty	
2014	Imperial Dreams	Peter Hall	
2017	The Last Word	Dr. Morgan	
2017	Gemini	Keith	
2018	All About Nina	Smoky	
2022	Raymond and Ray	Canfield	

Television credits
Year	Show	Role	Notes
1984–1985	Young People's Specials	Brian (1984), Jake (1985)	Episode: "That Funny Fat Kid" (1984), "Narc" (1985)
1987	ABC Afterschool Specials	various characters	
1993–1994	Phenom	Brian Doolan	
1995	The Critic	Johnny Wrath	voice, episode: A song for Margo
1995	Letter to My Killer (TV Movie)	Bradley	
1995	Iron Man	The Hacker	voice, season 2 episode 6: Iron Man, On The Inside
1995	Aaahh!! Real Monsters	Man/Teenager	voice, season 2 episode 9: Rosh O'Monster/The Tree of Ickins
1997	Fired Up	Little H.	Season 1 episode 2: The Next Day
1998–1999	Chicago Hope	Andy Sparks	
2004	Joan of Arcadia	Mr. Smith	Season 1 episode 18: Requiem for a Third Grade Ashtray
2004	Frasier	Jonathan	Season 11 episode 21: Detour
2004	Century City	Dave Pappas	Season 1 episode 6: Without a Tracer
2004	Without a Trace	Ned Atkins	Season 3 episode 8: Doppelganger: Part 2
2005	Everwood	Equipment Buyer	Season 3 episode 20: He Who Hesitates
2008	House	Stewart Nozick	Season 5 episode 7: "The Itch"
2009	In Plain Sight	Dennis Sampson/ Dennis Stewart	Season 2 episode 8: A Frond in Need
2009	Medium	Troy Sanborn	Season 6 episode 7: New Terrain
2010	The Good Guys	The Duke	Season 1 episode 9: Don't Tase Me, Bro
2011	Californication	Director	Season 4 episode 8: Lights, Camera, Asshole
2011	Off the Map	Greg Clemmons	Season 1 episode 9: There's Nothing to Fix
2013	Suburgatory	Bob	3 episodes
2018	Silicon Valley	Ariel Eklow	Season 5 episode 5: Facial Recognition

Film director
Year	Film	Notes
1995	The Fifteen Minute Hamlet	Short
2002	Love Liza	
2009	The Marc Pease Experience	
2012	Hello I Must Be Going	

Film writer
Year	Film	Notes
2015	Macbeth	Co-writer
