= Triple Bogey on a Par Five Hole =

1991 independent criminal comedy film directed by Amos Poe

- Directed by: Amos Poe
- Written by: Amos Poe
- Produced by: Benjamin Gruberg; Dolly Hall; Amos Poe
- Cinematography: Joe DeSalvo
- Edited by: Dana Congdon
- Music by: Michael Delory; Anna Domino; Mader; Chris Streetman
- Release date: 1991
- Running time: 85 minutes
- Country: United States
- Language: English

Triple Bogey on a Par Five Hole is a 1991 independent crime film directed by Amos Poe. It was Philip Seymour Hoffman's film debut.

== Plot ==
A couple of robbers focus on rich golfers and eventually meet their match with one last mark. Years later, a scriptwriter decides to observe the children of robbers who sail around Manhattan in the luxury yacht.

== Cast ==
- Eric Mitchell as Remy Gravelle
- Daisy Hall as Amanda Levy
- Alba Clemente as Nina Baccardi
- Jesse McBride as Satch Levy
- Angela Goethals as Bree Levy
- Robbie Coltrane as Steffano Baccardi
- John Schmerling as P.C. Brian O'Brien
- Tom Cohen as Freddie Arnstein
- Avital Dicker as Cookie
- Philip Seymour Hoffman as Klutch (as Phil Hoffman)
- Olga Bagnasco as Stacha (as Olga Bragnasco Starr)
- John Heys as Roman
- Lee Hegrin as Captain Aria (as Lee Nagrin)
- May Au as The Masseuse
- Chic Streetman as Joe Hawkins

== Reception ==
Film Review considered the film to be "starkly original", and remarked that nobody in the film was innocent.
