= Montana (1998 film) =

- DVD cover
- Directed by: Jennifer Leitzes
- Written by: Erich Hoeber; Jon Hoeber
- Produced by: Sean Cooley; Zane W. Levitt; Mark Yellen
- Starring: Kyra Sedgwick; Philip Seymour Hoffman; Stanley Tucci; Robin Tunney; Robbie Coltrane
- Cinematography: Ken Kelsch
- Edited by: Norman Buckley
- Music by: Cliff Eidelman
- Distributed by: Initial Entertainment Group
- Release date: January 16, 1998 (Sundance Film Festival)
- Running time: 96 minutes
- Country: United States
- Language: English
- Budget: $4,000,000 (estimated)

Montana is a 1998 American crime film directed by Jennifer Leitzes, written by Erich Hoeber and Jon Hoeber, and produced by Sean Cooley, Zane W. Levitt, and Mark Yellen.

== Plot ==
Claire is a professional hit woman who has been targeted by her own organization. Her boss gives her a low level task of retrieving his runaway girlfriend Kitty. Once Claire tracks down Kitty, she is unable to stop her from killing the boss' incompetent son.

== Cast ==
- Kyra Sedgwick as Claire Kelsky
- Stanley Tucci as Nicholas 'Nick' Roth
- Robin Tunney as Kitty
- Robbie Coltrane as The Boss
- John Ritter as Dr. Wexler
- Ethan Embry as Jimmy
- Philip Seymour Hoffman as Duncan
- Mark Boone Junior as Stykes
- Tovah Feldshuh as Greta
