= Love Liza =

2002 film by Todd Louiso

- Movie poster
- Directed by: Todd Louiso
- Written by: Gordy Hoffman
- Produced by: Ruth Charny; Chris Hanley; Corky O'Hara; Jeffrey Roda; Fernando Sulichin
- Starring: Philip Seymour Hoffman; Kathy Bates
- Cinematography: Lisa Rinzler
- Edited by: Ann Stein
- Music by: Jim O'Rourke
- Production companies: Wild Bunch; StudioCanal; Starhaus Filmproduktion
- Distributed by: Sony Pictures Classics
- Release dates: January 14, 2002 (Sundance); December 30, 2002 (limited)
- Running time: 90 minutes
- Countries: France; Germany; United States
- Language: English
- Budget: $1 million

Love Liza is a 2002 tragicomedic drama film directed by Todd Louiso and starring Philip Seymour Hoffman, Kathy Bates, Jack Kehler, Wayne Duvall, Sarah Koskoff and Stephen Tobolowsky. The film is written by Gordy Hoffman, a playwright and the elder brother of Philip. Love Liza debuted at the 2002 Sundance Film Festival, where it won the Waldo Salt Screenwriting Award.

== Plot ==
Wilson Joel's wife Liza has, for an inexplicable reason, died by suicide. Wilson discovers a sealed letter from his wife, which he believes to be her suicide note. In his grief-stricken state and with the added stress of finding the letter, which he cannot bring himself to open and read, he forms an addiction to inhaling gasoline fumes ("huffing"). His mother-in-law Mary Ann tries her best to help her son-in-law and deal with her own loss at the same time. She becomes increasingly anxious to know the contents of the letter, but Wilson refuses to open it.

To hide his addiction from his coworker Maura, he informs her that the petrol smell in his house is from his hobby of flying remote-controlled planes. To try to engage an ever-distant Wilson, Maura asks her brother-in-law, Denny, a radio control (RC) hobbyist, to visit Wilson. Knowing Denny will soon visit him, Wilson heads to an RC hobbyist shop to buy a plane, and learns that model planes run on Glow fuel instead of gasoline.

When Maura eventually confesses her attraction to Wilson, he runs away from her and begins a road trip to New Orleans from Indiana. He grows more disoriented as he huffs on the trip, and stumbles upon an RC competition in Slidell, Louisiana. Wilson goes swimming in the lake, disrupting the RC boat races. Denny greets him on the shore with a towel, and explains to all the upset racers that Wilson just lost his wife to suicide.

Denny drives Wilson back home. Along the way, he encourages Wilson to open Liza's letter, but he is horrified when Wilson wants to do it in front of him. Wilson finds his house empty after a robbery, and believing to have lost his wife's letter has a meltdown and his addiction grows out of control; he loses a work opportunity when a client discovers him huffing glow fuel with neighborhood kids.

After breaking into Mary Ann's house to get pictures of Liza, Wilson finds all of her clothes and pictures, and her alone holding Liza's letter. He opens it alone. His late wife's final wish is for Wilson to find someone else to love in life, while holding onto her in his heart. After he reads the final words of the letter, "Love, Liza," Wilson strikes a match found inside the letter and burns the letter. The gas fumes in the house ignite his clothes. Wilson peels them off and throws them to the floor, only igniting more fumes on the carpet and Liza's belongings that were taken from his home. In his underwear, he walks out of the burning house down the road.

== Cast ==
- Philip Seymour Hoffman as Wilson Joel
- J.D. Walsh as Bern
- Jimmy Raskin as Pad
- Kathy Bates as Mary Ann Bankhead
- Erika Alexander as Brenda
- Sarah Koskoff as Maura
- Jim Wise as Bland Man
- Trace Turville as Bland Woman
- Wayne Duvall as Gas Station Employee
- Stephen Tobolowsky as Tom Bailey
- Kevin Breznahan as Jim
- Jennifer Keddy as Lynne
- Jack Kehler as Denny
- Pauline Boyd as Zoo
- Ernest Perry Jr. as Trucker
- Cullen Douglas as Cashier at Pancake House
- Dan Klass as Officer Escort
- Chris Ellis as Patriot Model Aeronautics Clerk
- Julia Lashae as Breakfast Woman
- Don Hood as Good Morning Man
- John McConnell as High School Principal #1
- Kelli Garner as Huffer Girl
- Annie Morgan as Liza

== Production ==
When Gordy Hoffman wrote the screenplay for Love Liza, he did not originally envision his brother Philip for the lead role. Said Gordy, "In ’96, Phil and I just happened to both go home to Rochester for Labor Day weekend...I’d just finished Love Liza, and I gave it to him to read. I wasn’t even thinking about getting it made, it was just a matter of I’d finished something." Philip said of the script, "It was really, really good. I thought, It should get done, and then it was like, I’ll do it. It wasn’t like he asked me or I asked him.” The film spent over four years in development as the production sought financing and the script went through re-writes.

Love Liza was filmed in Mobile, Alabama and New Orleans in early 2001. Director Todd Louiso flew out Los Angeles-based actors at his own expense to fill out the film's supporting cast.

== Reception ==
=== Release ===
Love Liza premiered in January 2002 at the Sundance Film Festival and went on to screen at the Toronto International Film Festival and London Film Festival. At Sundance, the film was awarded the Waldo Salt Screenwriting Award for Gordy Hoffman. The film was picked up for distribution by Sony Pictures Classics and went into limited release on December 30, 2002, ultimately grossing $223,426 worldwide.

=== Critical reception ===
On review aggregate website Rotten Tomatoes, Love Liza has an approval rating of 52% based on 87 reviews. The critics' consensus states: "Hoffman's performance is strong, but the lack of character development and story arc makes Love Liza unsatisfying."

Rex Reed of The New York Observer praised Hoffman's performance, believing that it could have the same kind of impact on his career as Leaving Las Vegas had for Nicolas Cage. Todd McCarthy of Variety wrote "the situations in the film are fresh and inventive and just plain odd enough to keep interest reasonably high. Still, it’s doubtful that the film would register nearly so well without Philip Seymour Hoffman in the leading role. Pudgy, pasty and squinty-eyed, Hoffman would scarcely stand out in a crowd, and yet, as he almost always has in his numerous impressive character turns, the actor here displays a live wire personality that makes him a magnetic figure even when portraying a state of thorough-going misery."

However, A. O. Scott of The New York Times stated that Hoffman's "omnipresence is something of a mixed blessing", given that the protagonist is "more a state of feeling than a character".

In 2014, Jordan Hoffman of Vanity Fair noted the way the film "tackled depression and substance abuse in a dark-as-hell comedy that takes on an additional layer of sadness [after Hoffman's death]".
