= Owning Mahowny =

- Owning Mahowny film poster
- Directed by: Richard Kwietniowski
- Written by: Maurice Chauvet
- Based on: Stung: The Incredible Obsession of Brian Molony by Gary Stephen Ross
- Produced by: Andras Hamori; Seaton McLean
- Starring: Philip Seymour Hoffman; John Hurt; Minnie Driver; Maury Chaykin
- Cinematography: Oliver Curtis
- Edited by: Mike Munn
- Music by: The Insects; Richard Grassby-Lewis
- Production company: Natural Nylon
- Distributed by: Alliance Atlantis Releasing (Canada); Momentum Pictures (United Kingdom)
- Release date: 23 January 2003
- Running time: 104 minutes
- Countries: Canada; United Kingdom
- Language: English
- Budget: $10 million
- Box office: $1 million

Owning Mahowny is a 2003 Canadian crime drama film starring Philip Seymour Hoffman, Minnie Driver, Maury Chaykin and John Hurt. The film is based on the true story of Brian Molony, a Toronto bank employee who embezzled more than $10 million to feed his gambling addiction. Owning Mahowny was named one of the ten best films of the year by critic Roger Ebert.

== Plot ==
Between 1980 and 1982, Toronto bank employee Dan Mahowny is given access to bigger accounts with his promotion to assistant branch manager. His boss trusts him, but is unaware that Mahowny is a compulsive gambler. Mahowny is soon skimming larger and larger amounts for his own use and making weekly trips to Atlantic City, where he is treated like a king by the casino manager. Mahowny's girlfriend, fellow bank employee Belinda, cannot understand what is happening. Mahowny's criminal acts come to light when Toronto police begin to investigate his longtime bookie Frank.

== Cast ==
- Philip Seymour Hoffman as Dan Mahowny
- Minnie Driver as Belinda
- Maury Chaykin as Frank Perlin
- John Hurt as Victor Foss
- Sonja Smits as Dana Selkirk
- Ian Tracey as Detective Ben Lock
- Jason Blicker as Dave Quinson
- Chris Collins as Bernie
- Matthew Ferguson as Martin
- Janine Theriault as Maggie
- Conrad Dunn as Edgar
- Mike "Nug" Nahrgang as Parking Attendant
- Philip Craig as Briggs
- Tony Munch as Observer #2
- M. J. Kang as Secretary

== Real-life inspiration ==
Owning Mahowny is based on the life of a real person. Canadian Imperial Bank of Commerce clerk Brian Molony embezzled over $10 million from his employers in just 18 months to support his gambling habit. Molony's story was told in the best-selling 1987 book Stung by journalist Gary Ross, which formed the basis for the screenplay.

Molony was a manager at the Canadian Imperial Bank of Commerce, with access to significant resources. Upon the discovery of his gambling addiction and his crime, he was prosecuted in Canada by Crown Attorney Peter DeJulio. Molony was defended by Edward Greenspan. He received a sentence of six years imprisonment, as sought by the Crown. In an interview on the website of Stung publishers McClelland and Stewart, Ross says he has kept in touch with Molony and updated what happened to him after the events portrayed in the movie. Molony served only two years of his sentence. He has not gambled since his arrest, has married his girlfriend, has three sons and works as a financial consultant.

The Canadian Imperial Bank of Commerce took court action to recover funds from casinos in Atlantic City that enabled Molony's gambling addiction. The case was settled for an undisclosed sum.

== Reception ==
=== Critical response ===
On the review aggregator website Rotten Tomatoes, the film has a score of 78%, based on reviews from 96 critics, with an average rating of 7.1/10. The website's consensus reads, "This story of addiction may lack the typical flash and glamour, but Hoffman makes Owning Mahowny compelling." On Metacritic, the film has a score of 70 out of 100, based on reviews from 29 critics, indicating "generally favorable" reviews.

Roger Ebert of the Chicago Sun-Times named Owning Mahowny one of the top ten films of 2003, and assessed Hoffman's performance as "a masterpiece of discipline and precision", calling him a "fearless poet of implosion, [who] plays the role with a fierce integrity, never sending out signals for our sympathy because he knows that Mahowny is oblivious to our presence." However, some critics believed that in his self-effacing performance, Hoffman refused to conform to expectations of a typical movie character and that the movie suffered as a result. Stephanie Zacharek considered him to be a "character who squirms right out of our grasp", and despite being the movie's anchor, he's "such a vaporous one, he leaves us feeling adrift".

Asked whether Philip Seymour Hoffman's portrayal matched the real Brian Molony, journalist Gary Ross replied, "Remarkably so. They have the same stocky build, bushy moustache, glasses, slightly unkempt look, and earnestness. And Philip somehow managed to assimilate the psychic essence of Molony — a yawning emptiness that nothing except gambling was able to fill."

Owning Mahowny earned $1 million, significantly less than its $10 million budget.

=== Awards ===
Owning Mahowny received nominations for Best Motion Picture, Best Performance by an Actor in a Leading Role, Best Screenplay (Adapted) and Best Achievement in Music — Original Score (Richard Grassby-Lewis, Jon Hassell) at the 24th Genie Awards.
