= Jesus Hopped the 'A' Train =

2000 American play by Stephen Adly Guirgis

- Written by: Stephen Adly Guirgis
- Original language: English
- Subject: Prison
- Genre: Drama

Premiere
- Date premiered: November 2000
- Place premiered: Off-Broadway, New York City

Jesus Hopped The 'A' Train is a play written by Stephen Adly Guirgis.

== Plot synopsis ==
The play takes place in a prison on Rikers Island in New York. Angel Cruz and Lucius Jenkins face murder charges.

== Productions ==
The play premiered Off-Broadway at the East 13th Street Theatre in a production by LAByrinth Theater Company on November 29, 2000, and ran to December 31, 2000. The play was directed by Philip Seymour Hoffman. The original cast included Salvatore Inzerillo, John Ortiz, and David Zayas, Ron Cephas Jones, and Elizabeth Canavan.

The play was performed during the Fringe Festival in Edinburgh, Scotland in August 2001.

The play was produced in London at the Donmar Warehouse in 2002. It was nominated for the Olivier Award, Best New Play for 2003.

It then returned to New York City as writer Stephen Adly Guirgis began his residency at Signature Theatre Company. It starred Edi Gathegi, Sean Carvajal, Ricardo Chavira, Stephanie DiMaggio, and Erick Betancourt. It opened on the Pershing Square Signature Center's Irene Diamond Stage on October 23, 2017, and ran until November 26th, 2017. Previews started two days late, on October 5, due to Reg E. Cathey leaving the company suddenly to be replaced by Mr. Gathegi. The production team included director Mark Brokaw, Riccardo Hernández as set designer, Dede M. Ayite as costume designer, Scott Zielinski as lighting designer, and M.L. Dogg as sound designer.

== Reception ==
The production received considerable acclaim from critics such as Ben Brantley of the New York Times and Michael Feingold of The Village Voice. However, Pamela Renner reviewed the premiere unfavorably in Variety, with most praise reserved for Ron Cephas Jones. Renner criticized the characters of Hanraham and Valdez as heavy-handed, and also considered the play to contain "awkward exposition. It is freighted by an overload of pseudo-profundity; characters upbraiding each other about the Ultimate Questions can make for rather dreary stagecraft."

In a review of one of Guirgis's later works, Hilton Als described Jesus Hopped the 'A' Train as "hysterical and irreverent", "an outstanding 2000 piece about imprisonment and moral responsibility." Frank Scheck of The Hollywood Reporter reviewed a 2017 revival favorably, praising the "incisive characterizations and riveting dialogue". The critic wrote that there are "overwritten passages and reliance on expository monologues. But it also displays incendiary passion and insight into its troubled characters". In 2018, Jesus Hopped the 'A' Train was ranked by The New York Times writers as the 14th best American play of the previous 25 years.

Michael Billington of The Guardian, who had given the play three out of five stars in 2002, gave the same rating after a 2019 performance and said that "for all the vividness of the dialogue, the play still strikes me as baffling in its exploration of guilt, faith and redemption." Billington quipped that Angel's final sacrificial gesture "smacks more of romantic fiction than spiritual redemption [...] I enjoyed the production without fully believing in Guirgis's vision of crime and punishment." J. Kelly Nestruck of The Globe and Mail awarded it three and a half out of four stars in 2020, calling it "skillfully structured so that the audience’s sympathies see-saw back and forth between" Lucius and Valdez.
