= The Aliens (play) =

2010 play by Annie Baker

- Original language: English
- Written by: Annie Baker

Premiere
- Date: April 22, 2010
- Place: Rattlestick Playwrights Theater

The Aliens is a play by Annie Baker. The play is set in Vermont, as are three of Baker's other plays, Body Awareness, Circle Mirror Transformation, and Nocturama. The Aliens premiered Off-Broadway in 2010 and won the Obie Award for Best New American Play, with Baker's Circle Mirror Transformation.

== Productions ==
The Aliens premiered Off-Broadway at the Rattlestick Playwrights Theater on April 22, 2010 and closed on May 23, 2010. Directed by Sam Gold, the cast featured Michael Chernus, Dane DeHaan and Erin Gann. The play had a reading in April 2009 at the play-reading series, Out Loud by Ars Nova.

The play premiered in London at the Bush Theatre in September 2010.

Among United States regional productions, the play ran in Boston at Company One in October 2010, as part of the "Shirley, VT. Play Festival", which produced three of Baker's plays, all set in the fictional town of Shirley, Vermont.

The West Coast premiere was produced at the San Francisco Playhouse in 2012. Directed by Lila Neugebauer, it starred Brian Miskell as Evan, Peter O'Connor as Jasper, and Haynes Thigpen as KJ.

Later in 2012, Neugebauer would go on to stage a production at Washington D.C.'s Studio Theatre, again featuring Brian Miskell and Peter O'Connor, as well as Scot McKenzie as KJ.

It was also produced in Chicago at the Red Orchid Theatre in 2013.

Wabash College included the play as part of their 2014-2015 theater season.

The Ion Theatre Company in San Diego included the play in their 2015 season. Co-directed by Glenn Paris and Claudio Raygoza, it starred Tyler Oakley as Evan, Reed Willard as Jasper, and Brian Butler as KJ.

The play was translated to Greek and produced in January 2024 in Athens, Greece. It was directed by Michalis Panadis, starring himself as Christos (originally Jasper), Giannis Vasilottos as KJ and Anastasis Georgoulas as Vaggelis (originally Evan).

== Plot overview ==
The play takes place in a small town in Vermont. Two thirtyish men, Jasper and KJ, meet to discuss music and poetry in an alley behind a coffee shop. They discuss their band, which was called (among many things) The Aliens. KJ has dropped out of college and Jasper has not finished high school, but is writing a novel. When Evan, a high school student who works at the coffee shop arrives, the men "decide to teach him everything they know."

The writer of an article in the Boston Globe noted: "At least one-third of her play 'The Aliens' should be silent, uncomfortably so, a note in the text says."

== Critical response ==
Charles Isherwood, in his review for The New York Times, wrote that The Aliens is "a gentle and extraordinarily beautiful new play". He noted "Ms. Baker may just have the subtlest way with exposition of anyone writing for the theater today. Through the small details and telling asides we learn the fundamentals of this friendship, founded on a mutual sense of generalized alienation. At the risk of appearing hyperbolic, I’ll go so far as to say there is something distinctly Chekhovian in the way her writing accrues weight and meaning simply through compassionate, truthful observation... her subjects in 'The Aliens' are mighty indeed: no less than love and death, and how these two facets of human existence are woven into the fabric of life, the first sometimes unacknowledged or undivulged, the second ineluctable and often unforeseen. To say any more would be unfair, for the second act of this seemingly slight play takes a turn that is quietly devastating."

The Theatermania reviewer wrote that The Aliens "is another offbeat, slyly intriguing drama with comedy... There are seemingly more minutes of silence than there are of dialogue in Baker's script; the leanness makes strange and intriguing even the most banal exchanges. The effect is purposeful -- there's a mildly hazed authenticity that sounds like how people might talk while circled around a bong."

The Variety reviewer wrote that "In another world, “The Aliens” (one of many discarded names for the rock band that Jasper and KJ never got off the ground) would be another sensitive short story about the inarticulateness of a sad generation of lost boys. The slender story has more heft on the stage, but given the lack of action and conflict, along with all those self-indulgent pauses and attenuated stretches of silence, it doesn’t quite measure up as a full-length play."

The reviewer for the News-Herald (Ohio), writing about a production in Cleveland Heights, Ohio, observed that "Her style is that of a slow pace -- her works are insightful, with pauses for thought, and silence for introspection. Lighting and smoking of a cigarette, sitting and looking at nothing, strumming a guitar -- these are all devices to allow for meaningful thought. She develops ideas through subtlety, not screaming or excessive drama... The Aliens, like most of Baker’s works, is more character study than plot-driven."

In a review at The San Diego Union Tribune, James Hebert said the play was "well acted and nuanced, if not completely satisfying."

== Awards and nominations ==
Baker won the Obie Award for Best New American Play (with a check for $1,000), for The Aliens, jointly with Baker's Circle Mirror Transformation. The play also won the Obie Award for Directing (Sam Gold) and Performance (Dane DeHaan).

The Aliens was a finalist for the Susan Smith Blackburn Prize for 2009-2010.
