= Drama Desk Award for Outstanding Play =

Theatre award

- Awarded for: Outstanding Play
- Location: New York City
- Country: United States
- Presented by: Drama Desk
- First award: 1955
- Currently held by: Stereophonic (2024)
- Website: dramadesk.org

The Drama Desk Award for Outstanding Play is an annual award presented by Drama Desk in recognition of achievements in the theatre across collective Broadway, off-Broadway and off-off-Broadway productions in New York City. The award was initially introduced in 1955 as the Vernon Rice Award for Outstanding Achievement in Theatre, before being removed from the ceremony between 1960 and 1974. The award returned in the 1975 ceremony, with its current title.

== Winners and nominees ==
=== 1950s ===
Year	Play	Writer
1955
1955	Le Bal des Voleurs	Jean Anouilh
1955	The Merchant of Venice	William Shakespeare
1955	Twelfth Night	William Shakespeare
1955	The Way of the World	William Congreve
1955	The White Devil	John Webster
1956
1956	The Iceman Cometh	Eugene O'Neill
1957–59	—N/a	

=== 1960s ===
Year	Play	Writer
1960–69	not awarded	

=== 1970s ===
Year	Play	Writer
1970–74	not awarded	
1975
1975	Equus	Peter Shaffer
1975	Same Time, Next Year	Bernard Slade
1975	Absurd Person Singular	Alan Ayckbourn
1975	All Over Town	Murray Schisgal
1975	Hosanna	Michel Tremblay
1975	In Praise of Love	Terence Rattigan
1975	Naomi Court	Michael Sawyer
1975	The National Health	Peter Nichols
1975	P.S. Your Cat Is Dead	James Kirkwood, Jr.
1975	The Ritz	Terrence McNally
1975	Seascape	Edward Albee
1975	Sizwe Banzi Is Dead / The Island	Athol Fugard, John Kani and Winston Ntshona
1976
1976	Streamers	David Rabe
1976	Kennedy's Children	Robert Patrick
1976	Lamppost Reunion	Louis Larusso
1976	Medal of Honor Rag	Tom Cole
1976	Vanities	Jack Heifner
1977
1977	A Texas Trilogy	Preston Jones
1977	Otherwise Engaged	Simon Gray
1977	American Buffalo	David Mamet
1977	Comedians	Trevor Griffiths
1977	Gemini	Albert Innaurato
1977	G. R. Point	David Berry
1977	No Man's Land	Harold Pinter
1977	The Shadow Box	Michael Cristofer
1977	The Transfiguration of Benno Blimpie	Albert Innaurato
1978
1978	Da	Hugh Leonard
1978	Fifth of July	Lanford Wilson
1978	The Gin Game	Donald L. Coburn
1978	Landscape of the Body	John Guare
1978	The Merchant	Arnold Wesker
1978	The Water Engine	David Mamet
1979
1979	The Elephant Man	Bernard Pomerance
1979	Nevis Mountain Dew	Steve Carter
1979	On Golden Pond	Ernest Thompson
1979	Talley's Folly	Lanford Wilson
1979	Wings	Arthur Kopit

=== 1980s ===
Year	Play	Writer
1980
1980	Children of a Lesser God	Mark Medoff
1980	Home	Samm-Art Williams
1980	The Irish Hebrew Lesson	Wolf Mankowitz
1980	Night and Day	Tom Stoppard
1980	Talley's Folly	Lanford Wilson
1980	Teibele and Her Demon	Isaac Bashevis Singer and Eve Friedman
1981
1981	Amadeus	Peter Shaffer
1981	Crimes of the Heart	Beth Henley
1981	Fifth of July	Lanford Wilson
1981	Mass Appeal	Bill C. Davis
1982
1982	"Master Harold"...and the Boys	Athol Fugard
1982	A Soldier's Play	Charles Fuller
1982	The Dance and the Railroad	David Henry Hwang
1982	The Dining Room	A. R. Gurney
1982	Family Devotions	David Henry Hwang
1982	Grown Ups	Jules Feiffer
1983
1983	Torch Song Trilogy	Harvey Fierstein
1983	Brighton Beach Memoirs	Neil Simon
1983	Edmond	David Mamet
1983	Extremities	William Mastrosimone
1983	Geniuses	Jonathan Reynolds
1983	True West	Sam Shepard
1984
1984	The Real Thing	Tom Stoppard
1984	And a Nightingale Sang	C.P. Taylor
1984	A Private View	Václav Havel
1984	Glengarry Glen Ross	David Mamet
1984	Isn't It Romantic	Wendy Wasserstein
1984	Noises Off	Michael Frayn
1985
1985	As Is	William M. Hoffman
1985	Biloxi Blues	Neil Simon
1985	Digby	Joseph Dougherty
1985	Ma Rainey's Black Bottom	August Wilson
1986
1986	A Lie of the Mind	Sam Shepard
1986	Aunt Dan and Lemon	Wallace Shawn
1986	Benefactors	Michael Frayn
1986	Execution of Justice	Emily Mann
1986	Marriage of Bette and Boo	Christopher Durang
1986	Precious Sons	George Furth
1987
1987	Fences	August Wilson
1987	Broadway Bound	Neil Simon
1987	The Common Pursuit	Simon Gray
1987	Driving Miss Daisy	Alfred Uhry
1987	Les Liaisons Dangereuses	Christopher Hampton
1987	North Shore Fish	Israel Horovitz
1987	Wild Honey	Michael Frayn
1988
1988	M. Butterfly	David Henry Hwang
1988	Boys' Life	Howard Korder
1988	Joe Turner's Come and Gone	August Wilson
1988	The Road to Mecca	Athol Fugard
1988	Speed-the-Plow	David Mamet
1988	Woman in Mind	Alan Ayckbourn
1989
1989	The Heidi Chronicles	Wendy Wasserstein
1989	The Cocktail Hour	A. R. Gurney
1989	The Film Society	Jon Robin Baitz
1989	Only Kidding!	Jim Geoghan
1989	Reckless	Craig Lucas
1989	Shirley Valentine	Willy Russell

=== 1990s ===
Year	Play	Writer
1990
1990	The Piano Lesson	August Wilson
1990	The Lisbon Traviata	Terrence McNally
1990	Prelude to a Kiss	Craig Lucas
1990	The Secret Rapture	David Hare
1990	Some Americans Abroad	Richard Nelson
1991
1991	Lost in Yonkers	Neil Simon
1991	La Bête	David Hirson
1991	Six Degrees of Separation	John Guare
1991	The Wash	Philip Kan Gotanda
1992
1992	Marvin's Room	Scott McPherson
1992	A Small Family Business	Alan Ayckbourn
1992	Dancing at Lughnasa	Brian Friel
1992	Lips Together, Teeth Apart	Terrence McNally
1992	Mad Forest	Caryl Churchill
1992	Sight Unseen	Donald Margulies
1993
1993	Angels in America: Millennium Approaches	Tony Kushner
1993	Jeffrey	Paul Rudnick
1993	Joined at the Head	Catherine Butterfield
1993	Oleanna	David Mamet
1993	The Sisters Rosensweig	Wendy Wasserstein
1993	Three Hotels	Jon Robin Baitz
1994
1994	Angels in America: Perestroika	Tony Kushner
1994	All in the Timing	David Ives
1994	The Kentucky Cycle	Robert Schenkkan
1994	The Lights	Howard Korder
1994	Pterodactyls	Nicky Silver
1994	Three Tall Women	Edward Albee
1995
1995	Love! Valour! Compassion!	Terrence McNally
1995	Arcadia	Tom Stoppard
1995	The Cryptogram	David Mamet
1995	Missing Persons	Craig Lucas
1995	Raised in Captivity	Nicky Silver
1995	subUrbia	Eric Bogosian
1996
1996	Master Class	Terrence McNally
1996	The Model Apartment	Donald Margulies
1996	Molly Sweeney	Brian Friel
1996	Seven Guitars	August Wilson
1996	Sylvia	A. R. Gurney
1996	Valley Song	Athol Fugard
1997
1997	How I Learned to Drive	Paula Vogel
1997	Dealer's Choice	Patrick Marber
1997	The Last Night of Ballyhoo	Alfred Uhry
1997	The Skriker	Caryl Churchill
1997	This is Our Youth	Kenneth Lonergan
1998
1998	The Beauty Queen of Leenane	Martin McDonagh
1998	'Art'	Yasmina Reza
1998	As Bees In Honey Drown	Douglas Carter Beane
1998	Collected Stories	Donald Margulies
1998	Side Man	Warren Leight
1998	Three Days of Rain	Richard Greenberg
1999
1999	Wit	Margaret Edson
1999	Betty's Summer Vacation	Christopher Durang
1999	Closer	Patrick Marber
1999	Not About Nightingales	Tennessee Williams
1999	The Ride Down Mt. Morgan	Arthur Miller
1999	Snakebit	David Marshall Grant

=== 2000s ===
Year	Play	Writer
2000
2000	Copenhagen	Michael Frayn
2000	Contact with the Enemy	Frank D. Gilroy
2000	Dinner with Friends	Donald Margulies
2000	Dirty Blonde	Claudia Shear
2000	Jitney	August Wilson
2000	The Tale of the Allergist's Wife	Charles Busch
2001
2001	Proof	David Auburn
2001	Boy Gets Girl	Rebecca Gilman
2001	Comic Potential	Alan Ayckbourn
2001	The Invention of Love	Tom Stoppard
2001	Lobby Hero	Kenneth Lonergan
2001	The Unexpected Man	Yasmina Reza
2002
2002	The Goat, or Who Is Sylvia?	Edward Albee
2002	Metamorphoses	Mary Zimmerman
2002	Franny's Way	Richard Nelson
2002	The Shape of Things	Neil LaBute
2002	Thief River	Lee Blessing
2002	Topdog/Underdog	Suzan-Lori Parks
2003
2003	Take Me Out	Richard Greenberg
2003	Buicks	Julian Sheppard
2003	Our Lady of 121st Street	Stephen Adly Guirgis
2003	Peter and Vandy	Jay DiPietro
2003	Talking Heads	Alan Bennett
2003	Yellowman	Dael Orlandersmith
2004
2004	I Am My Own Wife	Doug Wright
2004	The Beard of Avon	Amy Freed
2004	The Distance from Here	Neil LaBute
2004	Humble Boy	Charlotte Jones
2004	Moby-Dick	Julian Rad
2004	The Tricky Part	Martin Moran
2005
2005	Doubt	John Patrick Shanley
2005	Democracy	Michael Frayn
2005	Pentecost	David Edgar
2005	The Pillowman	Martin McDonagh
2005	Sailor's Song	John Patrick Shanley
2005	Sin (A Cardinal Deposed)	Michael Murphy
2006
2006	The History Boys	Alan Bennett
2006	Dedication or The Stuff of Dreams	Terrence McNally
2006	The Lieutenant of Inishmore	Martin McDonagh
2006	No Foreigners Beyond This Point	Warren Leight
2006	The Pavilion	Craig Wright
2006	Stuff Happens	David Hare
2007
2007	The Coast of Utopia	Tom Stoppard
2007	The Accomplices	Bernard Weinraub
2007	Blackbird	David Harrower
2007	Frost/Nixon	Peter Morgan
2007	Radio Golf	August Wilson
2007	Some Men	Terrence McNally
2008
2008	August: Osage County	Tracy Letts
2008	Dividing the Estate	Horton Foote
2008	From Up Here	Liz Flahive
2008	Horizon	Rinde Eckert
2008	Intimate Exchanges	Alan Ayckbourn
2008	Rock 'n' Roll	Tom Stoppard
2009
2009	Ruined	Lynn Nottage
2009	Becky Shaw	Gina Gionfriddo
2009	Body Awareness	Annie Baker
2009	Fifty Words	Michael Weller
2009	Lady	Craig Wright
2009	reasons to be pretty	Neil LaBute

=== 2010s ===
Year	Play	Writer
2010
2010	Red	John Logan
2010	Circle Mirror Transformation	Annie Baker
2010	Clybourne Park	Bruce Norris
2010	Happy Now?	Lucinda Coxon
2010	My Wonderful Day	Alan Ayckbourn
2010	Next Fall	Geoffrey Nauffts
2011
2011	War Horse	Nick Stafford
2011	A Bright New Boise	Samuel D. Hunter
2011	A Small Fire	Adam Bock
2011	Bengal Tiger at the Baghdad Zoo	Rajiv Joseph
2011	Good People	David Lindsay-Abaire
2011	The Motherf**ker with the Hat	Stephen Adly Guirgis
2011	Other Desert Cities	Jon Robin Baitz
2012
2012	Tribes	Nina Raine
2012	The Big Meal	Dan LeFranc
2012	By the Way, Meet Vera Stark	Lynn Nottage
2012	Chinglish	David Henry Hwang
2012	Completeness	Itamar Moses
2012	The Lyons	Nicky Silver
2012	Unnatural Acts	Members of Plastic Theatre
2013
2013	Vanya and Sonia and Masha and Spike	Christopher Durang
2013	The Assembled Parties	Richard Greenberg
2013	Belleville	Amy Herzog
2013	Falling	Deanna Jent
2013	Finks	Joe Gilford
2013	The Flick	Annie Baker
2013	Sorry	Richard Nelson
2014
2014	All the Way	Robert Schenkkan
2014	Core Values	Steven Levenson
2014	Domesticated	Bruce Norris
2014	The Explorers Club	Nell Benjamin
2014	The Night Alive	Conor McPherson
2014	Outside Mullingar	John Patrick Shanley
2014	Regular Singing	Richard Nelson
2015
2015	The Curious Incident of the Dog in the Night-Time	Simon Stephens
2015	You Got Older	Clare Barron
2015	Airline Highway	Lisa D'Amour
2015	The City of Conversation	Anthony Giardina
2015	Between Riverside and Crazy	Stephen Adly Guirgis
2015	My Manãna Comes	Elizabeth Irwin
2015	Let the Right One In	Jack Thorne
2016	The Humans	Stephen Karam
2016	The Christians	Lucas Hnath
2016	John	Annie Baker
2016	King Charles III	Mike Bartlett
2016	The Royale	Marco Ramírez
2017
2017	Oslo	J. T. Rogers
2017	If I Forget	Steven Levenson
2017	Indecent	Paula Vogel
2017	A Life	Adam Bock
2017	Sweat	Lynn Nottage
2018
2018	Admissions	Joshua Harmon
2018	Mary Jane	Amy Herzog
2018	Miles for Mary	The Mad Ones
2018	People, Places and Things	Duncan Macmillan
2018	School Girls; Or, The African Mean Girls Play	Jocelyn Bioh
2019
2019	The Ferryman	Jez Butterworth
2019	Fairview	Jackie Sibblies Drury
2019	Lewiston/Clarkston	Samuel D. Hunter
2019	Usual Girls	Ming Peiffer
2019	What the Constitution Means to Me	Heidi Schreck

=== 2020s ===
Year	Play	Writer
2020
2020	The Inheritance	Matthew Lopez
2020	Cambodian Rock Band	Lauren Yee
2020	Greater Clements	Samuel D. Hunter
2020	Halfway Bitches Go Straight to Heaven	Stephen Adly Guirgis
2020	Heroes of the Fourth Turning	Will Arbery
2021	No awards: New York theatres shuttered, March 2020 to September 2021, due to the COVID-19 pandemic in New York City	
2022
2022	Prayer for the French Republic	Joshua Harmon
2022	The Chinese Lady	Lloyd Suh
2022	Cullud Wattah	Erika Dickerson-Despenza
2022	English	Sanaz Toossi
2022	Sanctuary City	Martyna Majok
2022	Selling Kabul	Sylvia Khoury
2023
2023	Leopoldstadt	Tom Stoppard
2023	A Case for the Existence of God	Samuel D. Hunter
2023	Fat Ham	James Ijames
2023	Love	Alexander Zeldin
2023	Prima Facie	Suzie Miller
2023	Wish You Were Here	Sanaz Toossi
2024
2024	Stereophonic	David Adjmi
2024	Infinite Life	Annie Baker
2024	Jaja's African Hair Braiding	Jocelyn Bioh
2024	Mother Play	Paula Vogel
2024	Swing State	Rebecca Gilman
2024	The Ally	Itamar Moses
2025
2025	Purpose	Branden Jacobs-Jenkins
2025	Blood of the Lamb	Arlene Hutton
2025	Deep Blue Sound	Abe Koogler
2025	Grangeville	Samuel D. Hunter
2025	John Proctor is the Villain	Kimberly Belflower
2025	Liberation	Bess Wohl
2026
2026	The Balusters	David Lindsay-Abaire
2026	Caroline	Preston Max Allen
2026	Cold War Choir Practice	Ro Reddick
2026	Meet the Cartozians	Talene Monahon
2026	Prince Faggot	Jordan Tannahill
2026	The Porch on Windy Hill	Sherry Stregack Lutken, Lisa Helmi Johanson, Morgan Morse, and David M. Lutken
2026	Well, I'll Let You Go	Bubba Weiler

== See also ==
- Laurence Olivier Award for Best New Play
- Tony Award for Best Play
