= Aaron Moten =

American actor (born 1989)

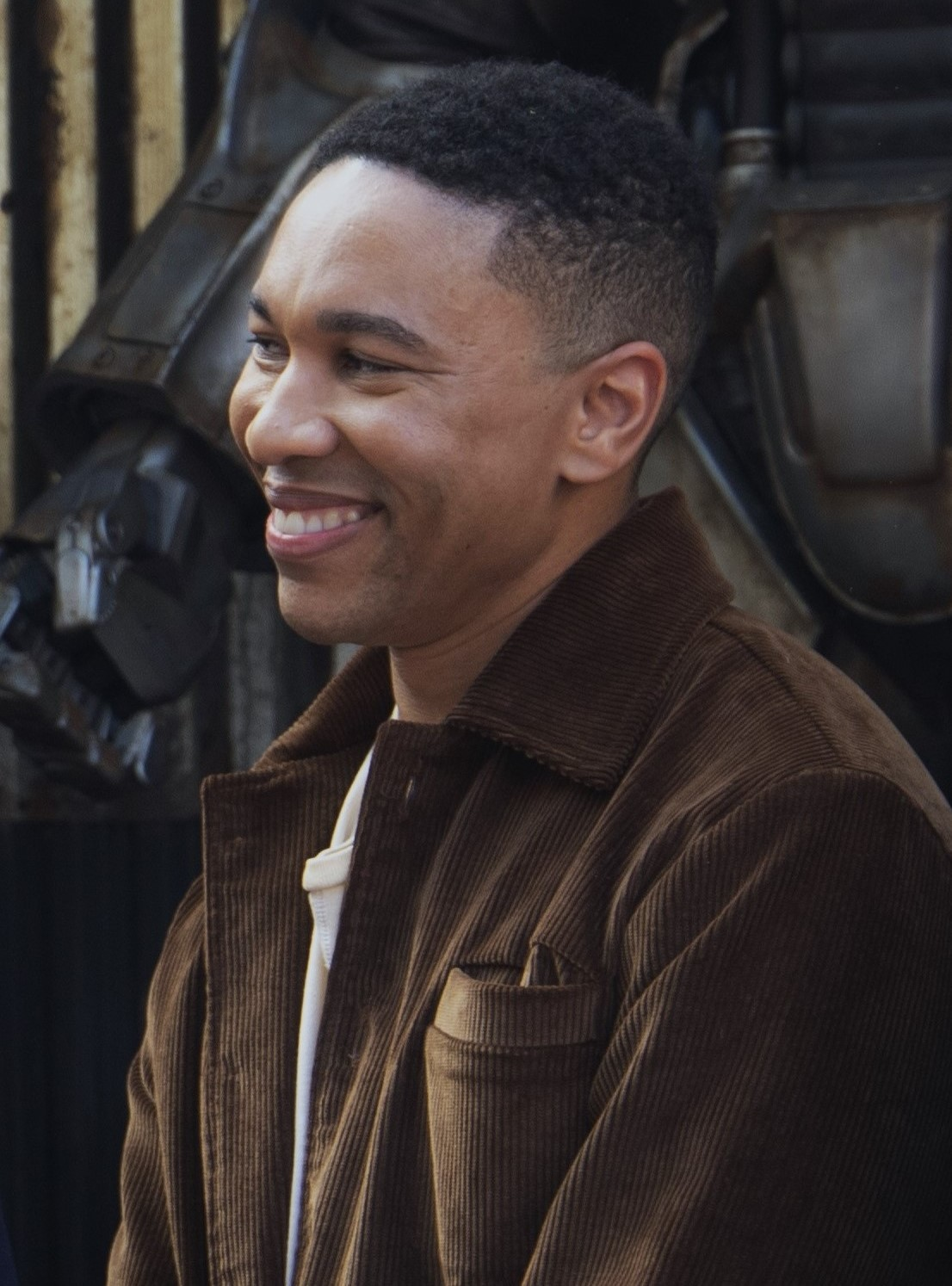
- Moten in 2024
- Born: Aaron Clifton Moten; February 28, 1989 (age 37); Austin, Texas, U.S.
- Education: Juilliard School (BFA)
- Occupation: Actor
- Years active: 2011–present
- Spouse: Lilja Rúriksdóttir (m. 2014)
- Children: 3

Aaron Clifton Moten (born February 28, 1989) is an American actor. He began acting as a youth, playing in his school theatre program. After graduating from the Juilliard School, he began professionally acting in New York City, playing in the main cast of the Netflix television sitcom Disjointed (2017–2018). Moten has since starred in Next (2020), Father Stu (2022), Emancipation (2022), and Fallout (2024–present).

== Early life and career ==
Aaron Moten was born on February 28, 1989 in Austin, Texas. He was educated at the St. Stephen's Episcopal School, where he began acting at the age of 12 after playing the lead role in a production of the Jim Leonard play The Diviners, after which he began participating in his school theatre program. Moten began professionally acting in New York City, where he graduated from the Juilliard School in 2011. That year, he played as Claudio in a Two River Theater production of Much Ado About Nothing by Shakespeare. In 2012, he appeared in a Broadway revival of A Streetcar Named Desire and was featured in a pilot for an HBO miniseries Criminal Justice.

== Career ==
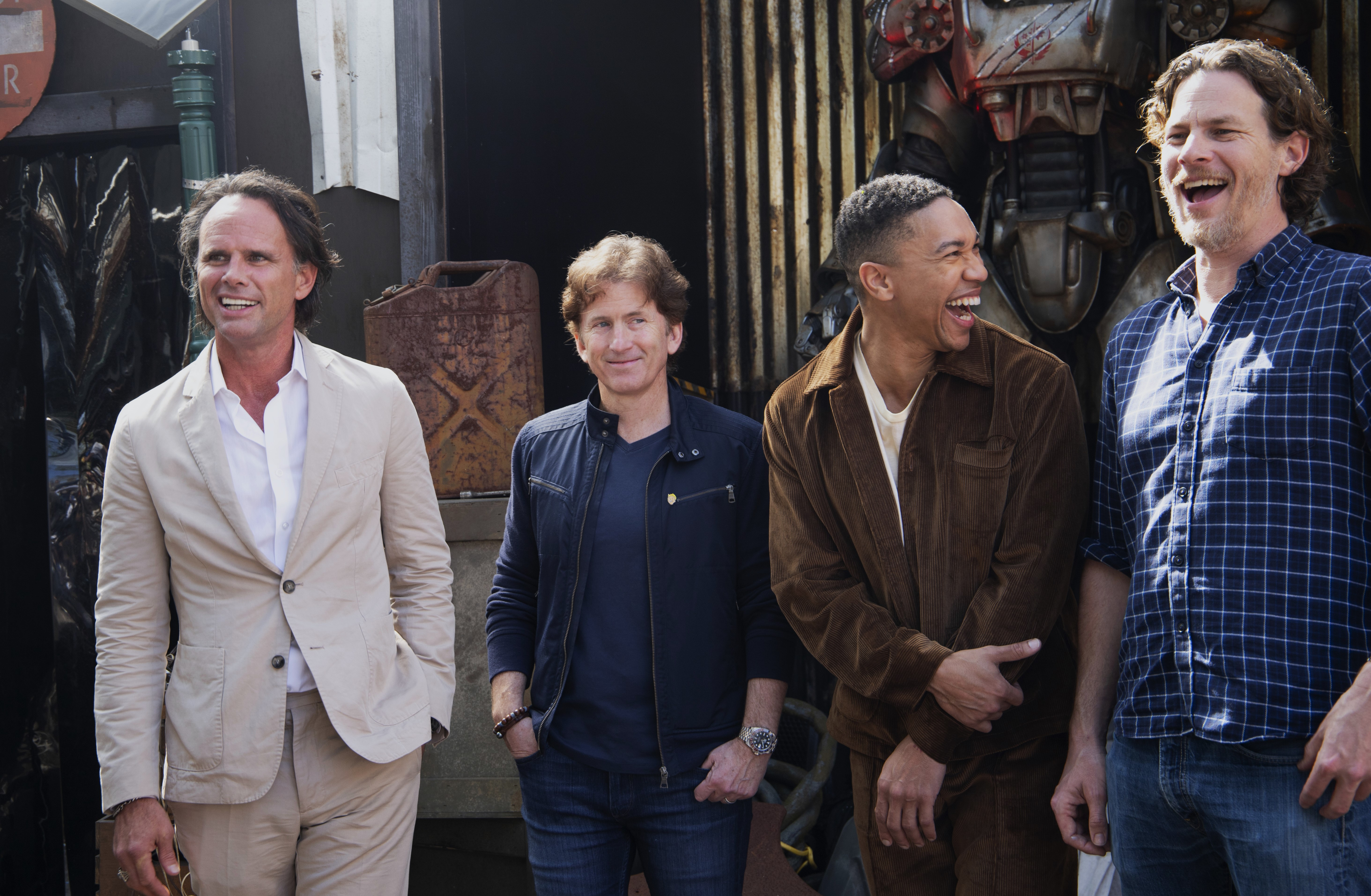
Moten (third from left) with Walton Goggins, Todd Howard and Jonathan Nolan at SXSW 2024

Moten went on to appear as Avery in the Annie Baker play The Flick (2013), for which he was nominated for a Drama Desk Award for Outstanding Featured Actor in a Play. In television, featured in the 2017-2018 Netflix sitcom Disjointed as Travis Feldman, a business school graduate and the son of Ruth Whitefeather Feldman. In 2020, he played as FBI employee Ben in the Fox drama series Next. In 2022, Moten went on to star as Ham in Mark Wahlberg's Father Stu, as well as Knowls in the historical action film Emancipation. In 2024, Moten starred in Amazon Prime Video's post-apocalyptic television series Fallout as Maximus, a Brotherhood of Steel squire.

== Personal life ==
Moten lives in Iceland with his wife, Icelandic dancer Lilja Rúriksdóttir, whom he met at Juilliard. Moten moved to the country shortly before the COVID-19 pandemic.

== Filmography ==
=== Film ===
Year	Title	Role	Notes
2014	Top Five	Supermarket Fan	
2015	Ricki and the Flash	Troy	
2016	The Transfiguration	Lewis	
2017	Ironwood	Devin Mann	
2019	Native Son	Tony	
2022	Father Stu	Ham	
2022	Emancipation	Knowls	
TBA	Nightwatching	TBA	Filming

=== Television ===
Year	Title	Role	Notes
2014	NCIS	Wendell Hobbs	Episode: "Crescent City (Part II)"
2015	The Mysteries of Laura	Ben Lee	Episode: "The Mystery of the Intoxicated Intern"
2015–2016	Mozart in the Jungle	Erik Winkelstrauss	6 episodes
2016	The Night Of	Petey	4 episodes
2017–2018	Disjointed	Travis	Main role
2020	Next	Ben	Main role
2024–present	Fallout	Maximus	Main role

=== Stage ===
Year	Title	Role	Venue	Notes
2011	Much Ado About Nothing	Claudio	Two River Theater	
2012	A Streetcar Named Desire	Young Collector	Broadhurst Theatre	Broadway
2013	The Flick	Avery	Playwrights Horizons	World premiere; Off-Broadway Nominated–Drama Desk Award for Outstanding Featured Actor in a Play
2015	The Flick	Avery	Barrow Street Theatre	Off-Broadway
2019	Romeo and Juliet	Romeo	The Old Globe	
