= Talene Monahon =

American actress and playwright

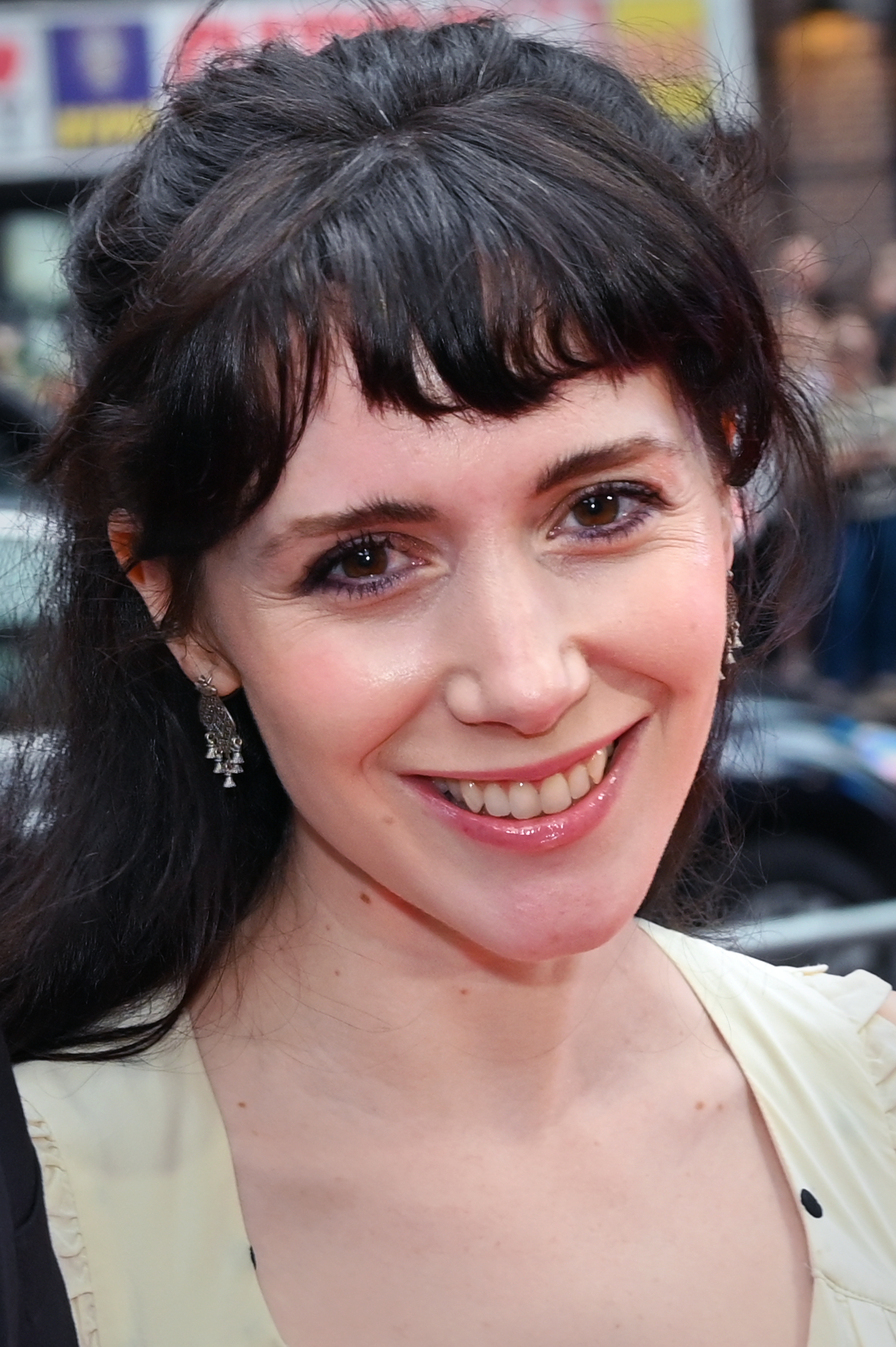
- Monahon in 2025
- Born: Boston, Massachusetts, U.S.
- Education: Dartmouth College (BA)

Talene Monahon is an Armenian-American actress and playwright.

Her play Meet the Cartozians was a finalist for the 2026 Pulitzer Prize for Drama.

== Early life ==
Monahon was born in Boston and grew up in Belmont, Massachusetts. She is a 2013 graduate of Dartmouth College.

Monahon was a child actor in regional and amateur productions in the Boston area.

== Career ==
=== How to Load a Musket ===
How to Load a Musket, Monahon's play about historical reenactment, was produced as a staged reading at the Cape Cod Theatre Project in 2017, and had its premier production at Manhattan's 59E59 Theaters in January 2020.

Monahon began researching historical reenactment in 2015, first interviewing Revolutionary War reenactors in Massachusetts and New York, then interviewing Civil War reenacters and performance artist Dread Scott, who produced a 2017 reenactment of the 1811 German Coast uprising. Monahon's play is created entirely from the words of her politically, ethnically and socioeconomically diverse interviewees, whose views of their hobby evolve over the years during which the interviews took place.

=== Meet the Cartozians ===
Her play, Meet the Cartozians, premiered Off-Broadway in 2025 at Second Stage Theatre, running from October 29 through December 14, 2025. Directed by David Cromer, the production starred Raffi Barsoumian, Will Brill, Andrea Martin, Nael Nacer, Susan Pourfar, and Tamara Sevunts. The production received critical acclaim, with The New York Times calling it "captivating" and TheatreMania praising it as "genuinely great."

The play was nominated for three Drama Desk Awards, including Outstanding Play, two Outer Critics Circle Awards, winning for Outstanding New Off-Broadway Play, and was a finalist for the 2026 Pulitzer Prize for Drama.

=== Acting ===
Monahon has performed on stage in New York and other cities. New York Times theater critic Laura Collins-Hughes describes Monahon as playing Blanche Sartorious in George Bernard Shaw's Widowers' Houses "with such take-no-prisoners ferocity that she awakened the sleeping man in front of me during a fight scene." Terry Teachout, theater critic for the Wall Street Journal, described Monahon's Blanche as "a startlingly predatory vampire," in a production of Shaw's work that was "as good as it gets."

Monahon has a handful of television acting credits, most recently appearing as Assistant District Attorney Conway in the CBS legal drama Bull.

== Plays ==
- How to Load a Musket (2020)
- Jane Anger (2022)
- The Good John Proctor (2023)
- Meet the Cartozians (2025)
- Wonder! A Woman Keeps a Secret (2027)

== Acting- Stage Credits ==
| Year | Title | Role | Venue | Ref. |
|---|---|---|---|---|
| 2014 | The Chocolate Show! | Woman 1 | Off-Broadway, 47th Street Theatre | |
| 2015 | The Wild Party | Mae | Off-Broadway, Off-City Center Encores! | |
| 2015 | A Confederacy of Dunces | Darlene | www.huntingtontheatre.org/2022/01/01/2015-2016-season/ | |
| 2017 | Tell Hector I Miss Him | La Gata | Off-Broadway, Atlantic Theatre Company | |
| 2017 | The Government Inspector | Performer | Off-Broadway, Red Bull Theatre | |
| 2017 | A Man's World | Lione Brune | Off-Broadway, Leonard Nimoy Thalia | |
| 2018 | Log Cabin | Myna | Off-Broadway, Playwrights Horizons | |
| 2018 | Apologia | Trudi | Off-Broadway, Roundabout Theatre Company | |
| 2022 | Jane Anger | Anne Hathaway (also playwright) | Off-off-Broadway, New Ohio Theatre; Shakespeare Theatre Company, Washington, D.C. | |
| 2023 | The Good John Proctor | Betty Paris (select performances; also playwright) | Off-Broadway, Connelly Theater | |
| 2026 | Wonder! A Woman Keeps A Secret | Gibby (shared role with Will Brill; also playwright) | Northern Stage, Vermont | |
| 2026 | The Family Dog | Jillian | Off-off-Broadway, Clubbed Thumb | |

== Awards and nominations ==
| Year | Award | Category | Work | Result | Ref. |
|---|---|---|---|---|---|
| 2026 | Pulitzer Prize | Drama | Meet the Cartozians | Nominated | |
| 2026 | Drama Desk Award | Outstanding Play | Meet the Cartozians | Nominated | |
| 2026 | Outer Critics Circle Award | Outstanding New Off-Broadway Play | Meet the Cartozians | Won | |
