= The Flick =

2013 play by Annie Baker

- 2013 Off-Broadway production poster
- Original language: English
- Written by: Annie Baker
- Characters: Sam; Skylar; Rose; Avery

Premiere
- Date: March 12, 2013
- Place: Playwrights Horizons; New York City

The Flick is a play by Annie Baker that received the 2014 Pulitzer Prize for Drama and won the 2013 Obie Award for Playwriting. The Flick premiered Off-Broadway at Playwrights Horizons in 2013.

== Productions ==
The Flick debuted Off-Broadway at Playwrights Horizons on March 12, 2013, after previews from February 15, 2013. Sam Gold directed a cast featuring Alex Hanna (Skylar/The Dreaming Man), Louisa Krause (Rose), Matthew Maher (Sam), and Aaron Moten (Avery). Scenery and costumes were designed by David Zinn. The lighting design was by Jane Cox; the sound designer was Bray Poor. Baker received a Harold and Mimi Steinberg Charitable Trust Commission, and the Steinberg Playwright Award. The play closed on April 7, 2013.

The play won the 2014 Pulitzer Prize for Drama; the Pulitzer committee stated that the play is a "thoughtful drama with well-crafted characters that focuses on three employees of a Massachusetts art-house movie theatre, rendering lives rarely seen on the stage."

The play opened at the Off-Broadway Barrow Street Theatre on May 18, 2015, with the original cast and creatives. A new cast began on September 1, 2015, featuring Kyle Beltran (Avery), Danny Wolohan (Sam), Brian Miskell (Skylar/The Dreaming Man) and Nicole Rodenburg (Rose). The play closed on January 10, 2016.

The play premiered in Chicago at the Steppenwolf Theatre Company running from February 4, 2016, to May 8.

It ran from March 1, 2016, to April 24, 2016, at the Signature Theatre in Arlington, Virginia with Evan Casey (Sam), Laura C Harris (Rose), Thaddeus McCants (Avery), and William Vaughan (Dreaming Man/Skylar), and directed by Joe Calarco.

The play was presented in London at the National Theatre from April 13, 2016, until June 15, 2016. Directed by Sam Gold, the cast featured Jaygann Ayeh, Sam Heron, Louisa Krause and Matthew Maher.

It opened on January 21, 2019, at the Drachengasse theatre in Vienna, Austria. Directed by Joanna Godwin-Seidl and starring Daniel Annoh (Avery), Jason Cloud (Sam), Denise Teipel (Rose) and Jack Midgley (Skylar/Dreaming Man).

It received its US west coast premiere at Shotgun Players in Berkeley, California. Running from August 22 to October 9, 2019, the play was directed by Jon Tracy and starred Chris Ginesi (Sam), Justin Howard (Avery), Ari Rampy (Rose), and Rob Dario (Skylar & Sleeping Man).

== Overview ==
The Flick is set in a run down movie palace near Worcester, Massachusetts and follows three underpaid movie ushers, Avery, Sam, and Rose (who also runs the film projector), who do the humdrum and tedious labor necessary for keeping it running, including toiling to clean spilled soda from the floors. The show is a comedy of the mundane delivered in bits of conversation that might be considered insignificant. Sam Gold said Baker's comedic writing was cleverly and surprisingly understated. Gold added that rhythm, meter and pace of the dialogue were cardinal to the comedy. Running three hours, the show has received complaints regarding its length. While recognizing the dissonance, Playwrights Horizons artistic director Tim Sanford sent a letter to some subscribers, acknowledging the concern, but finding it outweighed by the praise of others. He concluded there was no need to edit the play down.

== Critical response ==
StageGrade gives a median critics' rating for The Flick of B+ based on 22 reviews. Despite doubts about the play's length, the characters are said to be rich and the dialogue nuanced and entertaining. The lack of traditional theatricality is seen by some as a strength, and a weakness by others.

Charles Isherwood, reviewing for The New York Times described Baker as one of the most impressive dramatists from the Off-Broadway scene of her generation and noted that she "writes with tenderness and keen insight".

John Del Signore, reviewing the play in Gothamist, praised Baker "for capturing the halting, self-conscious vernacular of cerebral yet underachieving twenty-something suburbanites". Although Del Signore noted that the significance of some of the elements of Baker's presentation were challenging to summarize, he noted that "[T]he three misfits blunder in and out of each other's isolated bubbles, making contact in any way they can to alleviate the oppressive drudgery of their tasks."

Jesse Green acknowledged the need for brevity and clarity in his review for New York, and wrote:

No one does anything generally regarded as theatrical. ... So what does happen in The Flick? A lot of sweeping and mopping of the floor of a grotty old movie house near Worcester, Massachusetts. Also the tenderest drama—funny, heartbreaking, sly, and unblinking—now playing at a theater near you. ... It's uncanny; rarely has so much feeling been mined from so little content. Something's lost in the process, of course: brevity.

In a Playbill article, Robert Simonson noted that despite its irksome lengthy, static actionlessness, to some viewers the show was a splendid theatrical experience for serious theatregoers that wowed them with "existential minutiae" as presented by three performers who brought the themes to life. Critics of The New York Times listed The Flick in 2018 as the third-greatest American play of the past 25 years. The following year, writers for The Guardian ranked it fourth on a list of the best theatrical works since 2000.

== Awards and nominations ==
=== 2013 Off-Broadway production ===
Year	Award	Category	Nominee	Result
2013	Susan Smith Blackburn Prize		Annie Baker	Won
2013	Obie Award	Distinguished Playwriting	Annie Baker	Won
2013	Drama Desk Award	Outstanding Play		Nominated
2013	Drama Desk Award	Outstanding Featured Actor in a Play	Aaron Clifton Moten	Nominated
2013	Drama Desk Award	Outstanding Set Design	David Zinn	Nominated
2013	Lucille Lortel Award	Outstanding Play		Nominated
2013	Lucille Lortel Award	Outstanding Director	Sam Gold	Nominated
2013	Lucille Lortel Award	Outstanding Lighting Design	Jane Cox	Nominated
2013	Lucille Lortel Award	Outstanding Sound Design	Bray Poor	Nominated
2014	Pulitzer Prize for Drama		Annie Baker	Won

=== Original London production ===
Year	Award	Category	Nominee	Result
2016	Critics’ Circle Theatre Award	Best New Play	Annie Baker	Won
