= Peter Friedman =

American actor (born 1949)

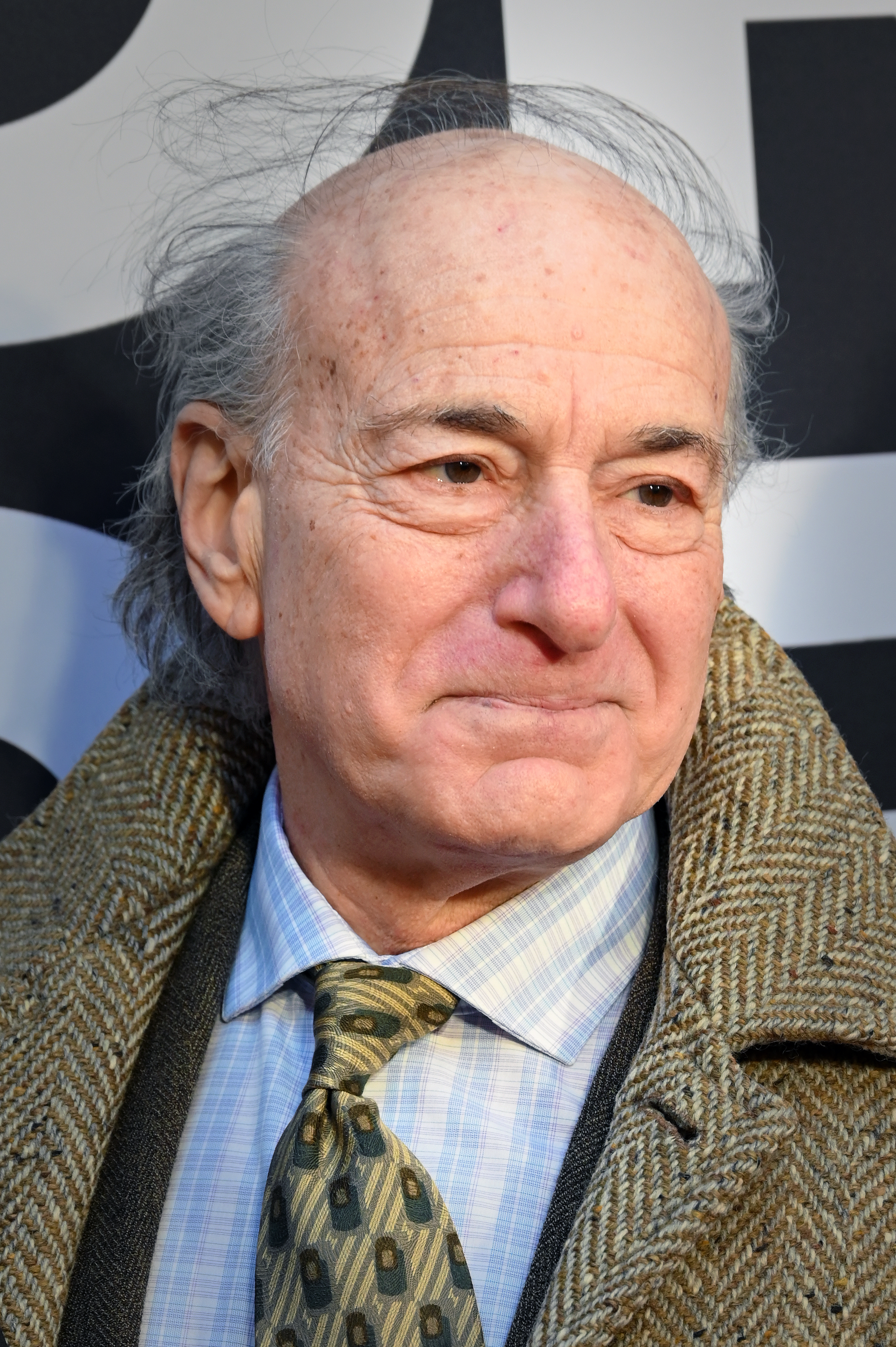
- Friedman in 2025
- Born: April 24, 1949 (age 77); New York City, U.S.
- Education: Hofstra University
- Occupation: Actor
- Years active: 1972–present
- Spouse: Joan Allen (m. 1990; div. 2002)
- Children: 1

Peter Friedman (born April 24, 1949) is an American stage, film, and television actor. He made his Broadway debut in the Eugene O'Neill play The Great God Brown in 1972. His other Broadway credits include roles in The Rules of the Game (1974), Piaf (1981), The Heidi Chronicles (1989), and Twelve Angry Men (2004). He earned a Tony Award for Best Actor in a Musical nomination for his role as Tateh in Ragtime (1998).

Friedman gained prominence for his role as Frank Vernon in the HBO drama series Succession (2018–2023) for which he won a Screen Actors Guild Award. His other television credits include The Affair (2015), The Path (2016–2018), and The Marvelous Mrs. Maisel (2023). He is also known for his film roles in Safe (1995), The Savages (2007), I'm Not There (2007), Synecdoche, New York (2008), Side Effects (2013), and She Said (2022).

== Early life and education ==
Born in New York City on April 24, 1949. Friedman graduated from Hofstra University. Friedman is Jewish.

== Career ==
=== 1980–1994: Broadway debut and early roles ===
Friedman has appeared in thirteen Broadway productions, starting in 1972 with The Great God Brown. He appeared in a Broadway revival of The Visit in 1973, as the Carpenter. He appeared in Piaf in 1981 on Broadway, and A Soldier's Play Off-Broadway, also in 1981. He played the role of Humphrey Taylor in the Off-Broadway production of The Common Pursuit, from October 1986 to August 1987, receiving a nomination for the Drama Desk Award, Outstanding Featured Actor in a Play. In his review for The New York Times, Frank Rich commented "The always impressive Mr. Friedman, as the embittered Wagnerian...allow us to empathize with characters who might otherwise be merely obnoxious or colorless."

He appeared in both the Off-Broadway and Broadway productions of The Heidi Chronicles in 1988 and 1989 in the role of Scoop Rosenbaum. He received a nomination for the Drama Desk Award for Outstanding Actor in a Play for The Heidi Chronicles. He appeared Off-Broadway in the Manhattan Theatre Club production of the Donald Margulies play The Loman Family Picnic, from October 1993 to January 1994. The Best Plays of 1993-1994 commented "...Friedman inverting his usual dynamism to play the beleaguered father..."

Early in his career he performed in several episodes of The Muppet Show in its first and third seasons, and spent a brief time on Sesame Street. On television, Friedman starred as George Silver in Brooklyn Bridge (1991–1993) and has made numerous guest appearances in such series as Miami Vice, NYPD Blue, Without a Trace, and Ghost Whisperer. Friedman's many feature film credits include Prince of the City (1981), Daniel (1983), The Seventh Sign (1988), Single White Female (1992), and Blink (1993).

=== 1995–2015: Character actor ===
In 1995 Friedman earned a prominent role in the Todd Haynes drama film Safe starring Julianne Moore. The All Movie Guide reviewer wrote, "Avid filmgoers and adherents to the indie film movement that swept through America in the early to mid-'90s will invariably remember Peter Friedman as the sneaky, underhanded, New Age-espousing "self-help guru" who supposedly attempts to offer ailing Julianne Moore a hand up—but only succeeds in draining her wallet—in Todd Haynes' harrowing drama Safe (1995). In truth, that role represented just one of many memorable cinematic contributions for the prolific, highly versatile character actor, whose resumé reads like a best-of list of both independent film and Hollywood product." He also acted in I'm Not Rappaport (1996), I Shot Andy Warhol (1996), Paycheck (2003), Freedomland (2006), The Savages (2007), I'm Not There (2007), and Breaking Upwards (2009).

He played the role of Jewish immigrant "Tateh" in the musical Ragtime in the pre-Broadway tryout (1996) and on Broadway (1998). He was nominated for the 1998 Tony Award for Best Performance by a Leading Actor in a Musical and the Drama Desk Award for Outstanding Actor in a Musical for his role in Ragtime. He acted in the miniseries Perfect Murder, Perfect Town: JonBenét and the City of Boulder. He appeared in a Law & Order episode titled "Attorney Client" as defense lawyer Harold Jensen, broadcast on May 8, 2002. He appeared on Broadway in the Roundabout Theatre Company production of Twelve Angry Men from October 2004 to March 2005. For his role as "Frank" in Body Awareness, which ran Off-Broadway in 2008, Friedman received a nomination for the Drama Desk Award, Outstanding Featured Actor in a Play.

From October to November 2009, Friedman played James, the husband of the teacher of a community acting class in Annie Baker's play Circle Mirror Transformation in the Peter J. Sharp Theater at Playwrights Horizons. The show also featured Heidi Schreck, Reed Birney, Deirdre O'Connell, and Tracee Chimo and was directed by Sam Gold. The cast received a 2010 Drama Desk Award for Best Ensemble Performance. Friedman appeared in the Williamstown Theatre Festival production of Amy Herzog's After the Revolution in July and August 2010 as "Ben", and reprised his role in the Off-Broadway production at Playwrights Horizons from October to November 2010. The New York Times reviewer wrote: "Mr. Friedman burrows deeply into Ben's anguish at being cut off by the daughter he raised to carry on the family tradition, the wound smarting all the more because he knows his own mistakes have caused the fissure."

He played the role of "Doug" in the Off-Broadway play The Great God Pan from December 2012 to January 2013, and received a nomination for the Drama Desk Award for Outstanding Featured Actor in a Play. The New York Times reviewer commented: "The recollections of his parents, small roles incisively portrayed by the reliable Becky Ann Baker and Peter Friedman..." From August 2013 to September 2013 he played the role of "Meckel" in the Off-Broadway production (and New York premiere) of Lauren Yee's The Hatmaker's Wife. Ben Brantley, in his review for The New York Times wrote: "Mr. Friedman brings unblushing good will and vivacity to assignments that include walking around with a clothespin on his nose..." He appeared Off-Broadway in the musical Fly By Night as "Mr McClam" from May to June 2014.

=== 2016–present: Succession and acclaim ===
Friedman took roles in The Affair and Damages. He portrayed Hank Armstrong in the Hulu series The Path from 2016 to 2018 and he acted as Jim in the HBO series High Maintenance also from 2016 to 2018. In 2017 he portrayed Polonius in the Public Theatre's production of Hamlet starring Oscar Isaac and Keegan-Michael Key. That same year he appeared Off-Broadway in the world premiere of The Treasurer at Playwrights Horizons as The Son, for which he was nominated for a 2018 Lucille Lortel Award for Best Actor.

From 2018 to 2023, he played Frank Vernon, long-time confidant of Logan Roy and vice-chairman of Waystar Royco in the series Succession. He won the Screen Actors Guild Award for Outstanding Performance by an Ensemble in a Drama Series along with the cast in 2022 and 2023. In 2022 he played Lanny Davis in the MeToo movement drama She Said (2022) for which he received favorable notices, with Jocelyn Noveck of The Associated Press describing him as "excellent". On March 27, 2023, Friedman reprised his role of "Tateh" in a sold-out 25th Anniversary performance of Ragtime at the Minskoff Theater to benefit the Entertainment Community Fund. In 2023 he took a recurring role as George in the final season of the Amazon Prime Video comedy series The Marvelous Mrs. Maisel.

In 2023 he portrayed a therapist in the Max Wolf Friedlich play Job. Friedman acted opposite Sydney Lemmon at the SoHo Playhouse in New York City. Sara Holden of Vulture praised Friedman writing, "Friedman is especially delightful to watch because he just seems so damn effortless... has a natural ease and appeal, a sense that he’s never pushing too hard". Juan A. Ramirez of The New York Times wrote of Friedman's performance, "[He] imbues Loyd’s counterarguments with a genuine passion". Freidman returned to the play in 2024 with the production transferring to the Connelly Theater in the East Village.

== Personal life ==
In 1990, Friedman married Joan Allen. Though they divorced in 2002, they chose to live close to one another in order to share time with their daughter.

== Filmography ==
=== Film ===
Year	Title	Role	Notes
1980	Christmas Evil	Mr. Grosch	
1981	Prince of the City	D.A. Goldman	
1983	Daniel	Ben Cohen	
1988	The Seventh Sign	Father Lucci	
1992	Single White Female	Graham Knox	
1993	Blink	Dr. Ryan Pierce	
1995	Safe	Peter Dunning	
1996	I Shot Andy Warhol	Alan Burke	
1996	I'm Not Rappaport	Young Nat's Father	
2001	Someone like You	Stephen	
2003	Paycheck	Attorney General Brown	
2004	King of the Corner	Arthur Wexler	
2006	Freedomland	Lt. Gold	
2007	The Savages	Larry	
2007	Spinning into Butter	Jay Salter	
2007	I'm Not There	Morris Bernstein / Barker	
2008	Synecdoche, New York	Emergency Room Doctor	
2009	The Messenger	Mr. Cohen	
2009	Breaking Upwards	Alan	
2010	Love & Other Drugs	California Man	
2011	Coming Up Roses	Charles	
2013	Side Effects	Gene	
2022	She Said	Lanny Davis	

=== Television ===
Year	Title	Role	Notes
1975	Great Performances	Marquis Miglioriti	Episode: "The Rules of the Game"
1976	Sesame Street	Additional role	Voice; 2 episodes
1976–1978	The Muppet Show	Additional roles	Voice; 9 episodes
1983	Rage of Angels	Larry	Television film
1985	Finnegan Begin Again	John Jewell	Television film
1985	Miami Vice	Morgan	Episode: "Nobody Lives Forever"
1988	Hothouse	David	2 episodes
1991	The Days and Nights of Molly Dodd	Harry	Episode: "Here's a Little Touch of Harry in the Night"
1991–1993	Brooklyn Bridge	George Silver	33 episodes
1994–2009	Law & Order	Various roles	3 episodes
1995	The Heidi Chronicles	Scoop Rosenbaum	Television film
1997	In the Presence of Mine Enemies	Kohn	Television film
2000	Perfect Murder, Perfect Town	Peter Hofstrom	Miniseries
2002	Baby Bob	Peter	Episode: "The Tell-Tale Art"
2002	Two Against Time	Robert Portman	Television film
2002	Power and Beauty	Sam Giancana	Television film
2003	NYPD Blue	Dr. Auken	Episode: "Your Bus, Ted"
2003	Without a Trace	Damon	Episode: "Prodigy"
2006	Heist	Rabbi	Episode: "Strife"
2006	Ghost Whisperer	Steve Burris	Episode: "A Grave Matter"
2007	Damages	District Attorney	Episode: "Because I Know Patty"
2012	Made in Jersey	Judge Henry Sohn	Episode: "Pilot"
2012	666 Park Avenue	Samuel Steinberg	Episode: "Diabolic"
2013	Person of Interest	Lawrence Szilard	Episode: "God Mode"
2014	Submissions Only	Stuart Schulman	Episode: "Petite Sweet Ending in N"
2015	The Affair	Robert	3 episodes
2016–2018	The Path	Hank Armstrong	23 episodes
2016–2018	High Maintenance	Jim	2 episodes
2018–2023	Succession	Frank Vernon	32 episodes
2023	The Marvelous Mrs. Maisel	George	6 episodes

=== Theatre ===
Year	Title	Role	Venue
1972	The Great God Brown	Committeeman	Lyceum Theatre, Broadway
1972	Don Juan	Commander / Don Carlos	Lyceum Theatre, Broadway
1973	The Visit	Carpenter	Ethel Barrymore Theatre, Broadway
1973	Chemin De Fer	Auguste	Ethel Barrymore Theatre, Broadway
1973	Holiday	Seton Cram	Ethel Barrymore Theatre, Broadway
1974	Love for Love	Ben	Helen Hayes Theatre, Broadway
1974	The Rules of the Game	Marquis Migliorriti	Helen Hayes Theatre, Broadway
1981	Piaf	Papa Leplée	Plymouth Theatre, Broadway
1981	A Soldier's Play	Captain Charles Taylor	Theatre Four, Off-Broadway
1986	Execution of Justice	Douglas Schmidt	Virginia Theatre, Broadway
1986	The Common Pursuit	Humphry Taylor	Promenade Theatre, Off-Broadway
1988	The Heidi Chronicles	Scoop Rosenbaum	Playwrights Horizons, Off-Broadway
1989	The Heidi Chronicles	Scoop Rosenbaum	Plymouth Theatre, Broadway
1989	The Tenth Man	Arthur Brooks	Vivian Beaumont Theater, Broadway
1993	The Loman Family Picnic	Herbie	New York City Center, Off-Broadway
1996	Ragtime	Tateh	Ford Centre for the Performing Arts, Toronto
1997	Ragtime	Tateh	Ford Center for the Performing Arts, Broadway
2004	Twelve Angry Men	Juror Ten	American Airlines Theatre, Broadway
2008	Body Awareness	Frank	Atlantic Theater Company, Off-Broadway
2009	Circle Mirror Transformation	James	Playwrights Horizons, Off-Broadway
2010	After the Revolution	Ben	Playwrights Horizons, Off-Broadway
2012	The Great God Pan	Doug	Playwrights Horizons, Off-Broadway
2013	The Hatmaker's Wife	Meckel	Playwrights Horizons, Off-Broadway
2014	The Open House	Dad	Signature Theatre, Off-Broadway
2014	Fly by Night	Mr. McClam	Playwrights Horizons, Off-Broadway
2017	Hamlet	Polonius	The Public Theater, Off-Broadway
2017	The Treasurer	The Son	Playwrights Horizons, Off-Broadway
2018	The Beast in the Jungle	Old John Marcher	Vineyard Theatre, Off-Broadway
2023	Ragtime	Tateh	Minskoff Theatre, Broadway
2023	Job	Loyd	SoHo Playhouse, Off-Broadway
2024	Job	Loyd	Connelly Theatre, Off-Broadway
2024	Job	Loyd	Helen Hayes Theatre, Broadway
2026	You Got Older	Dad	Cherry Lane Theater, Off-Broadway

== Awards and nominations ==
Year	Award	Category	Project	Result	Ref.
1987	Drama Desk Award	Outstanding Featured Actor in a Play	The Common Pursuit	Nominated	
1989	Drama Desk Award	Outstanding Actor in a Play	The Heidi Chronicles	Nominated	
1998	Drama Desk Award	Outstanding Actor in a Musical	Ragtime	Nominated	
2009	Drama Desk Award	Outstanding Featured Actor in a Play	Body Awareness	Nominated	
2013	Drama Desk Award	Outstanding Featured Actor in a Play	The Great God Pan	Nominated	
2014	Drama Desk Award	Outstanding Ensemble Performance	The Open House	Won	
2015	Drama Desk Award	Outstanding Featured Actor in a Musical	Fly by Night	Nominated	
1998	Tony Award	Best Lead Actor in a Musical	Ragtime	Nominated	
2022	Screen Actors Guild Awards	Outstanding Ensemble in a Drama Series	Succession	Won	
2024	Screen Actors Guild Awards	Outstanding Ensemble in a Drama Series	Succession	Won	

Preceded by None	Performer of Two-Headed Monster (right head); 1978	Succeeded by Richard Hunt
