= Body Awareness =

2008 American one-act play written by Annie Baker

- Original language: English
- Written by: Annie Baker
- Characters: Joyce; Phyllis; Jared; Frank

Premiere
- Date: May 28, 2008
- Place: Atlantic Theater Company

Body Awareness is a 2008 American one-act play written by Annie Baker. The play premiered Off-Broadway on May 28, 2008.

== Background ==
This play marked the Off-Broadway debut for Annie Baker. The play takes place at Shirley State College in Shirley, Vermont, which "evokes Amherst, Mass., where Ms. Baker... grew up, or Keene State College in New Hampshire, where her mother teaches now." Baker said, "My goal for the play is to not judge anyone, to get at that point where everyone is equally right and equally wrong, so the humor comes from that... I wanted to write a play about issues that wasn’t an 'issue play'."

The play was developed at the 2007 Bay Area Playwrights Festival, San Francisco, California, part of the Playwrights Foundation, and with the support of Atlantic Stage 2.

== Plot synopsis ==
The play is set in the fictional small town of Shirley, Vermont. Phyllis is a professor of psychology, and has organized a campus Body Awareness Week, whose topics range from a dance troupe of refugee Palestinian children to an eating disorder seminar. She lives with her partner Joyce, a high school social studies teacher, and Joyce's 21-year-old son Jared, from a prior marriage. Jared shows several symptoms of Asperger's syndrome, but he refuses to see a therapist for treatment. Their houseguest is a middle-aged photographer named Frank Bonitatibus, whose artistic photos of nude women offend Phyllis. Frank's presence exacerbates the already existing tension between the three of them, and when Joyce agrees to pose for one of Frank's pictures, this threatens her relationship with Phyllis. Meanwhile, Jared, a self-described autodidact who works at McDonald's until he successfully tries to get fired because he hates his co-workers, asks Frank for advice on how to attract women.

== Productions ==
Body Awareness premiered Off-Broadway at the Atlantic Theater Company from May 28, 2008 (previews) to June 22, 2008. Directed by Karen Kohlhaas, the cast featured JoBeth Williams (Joyce), Mary McCann (Phyllis), Jonathan Clem (Jared) and Peter Friedman (Frank).

The Boston premiere took place from October 22, 2010 until November 20, 2010. It was produced by the SpeakEasy Stage Company and teamed with Company One (which put on Aliens) and the Huntington Theatre Company (which put on Circle Mirror Transformation) as part of "The Shirley, VT Plays" Festival. It was directed by Paul Daigneault, with scenic design by Cristina Todesco, costume design by Bobby Frederick Tilley II, lighting design by Jeff Adelberg, original music and sound design by Nathan Leigh, and Victoria S. Coady as production stage manager. The SpeakEasy cast featured Paula Plum (Joyce), Adrianne Krstansky (Phyllis), Gregory Pember (Jared) and Richard Snee (Frank).

The play was produced at the Aurora Theatre, Berkeley, California from December 2012 to March 2013, the first play of Baker's to be performed in the San Francisco Bay Area.

== Critical reception ==
Charles Isherwood, in his review for The New York Times, wrote: "...low-key, engaging new comedy by Annie Baker, a young playwright with a probing, understated voice, making her Off Broadway debut. 'Body Awareness,' which opened Wednesday night at the Atlantic Stage 2, is not exactly a dazzler. It announces its everyday quality almost proudly, as the characters mark the passage of time by writing the days of the week on a chalkboard at the back of the stage. But its quiet rewards steal up on you... Ms. Baker’s generosity of heart, embodied most touchingly in the character of Joyce, and in Ms. Williams’s sensitive performance, invites you to overlook the occasional misstep."

In reviewing the 2010 Boston production, the ArtsFuse reviewer wrote: "Annie Baker’s characters strip themselves down to their raw emotions: this is a play where characters don’t remove their clothes but the walls they’ve built to protect their inner selves. Essentially, the body awareness the script explores is not a matter of a healthy self image but a more nurturing awareness of the bodies and souls around us."

The reviewer of the 2012 California production for the sfgate called the play "hilarious" and noted the "...smart, provocative dialogue and even more pointed silences..."

In a review of a 2012 production at Theatre J, Washington, D.C., in The Washington Post, Nelson Pressley wrote: "The result in the easygoing 'Body Awareness' is indeed very funny, skewering everything from the professor’s pretensions to the blunt sex talk Frank delivers to Jared... Baker’s dialogue is tart and personable, with just enough unexpected twists in the characterizations to keep you leaning forward... Baker is fast becoming one of the country’s more popular playwrights... and it may be because she has a lovely ability to comically mock types and trends while exposing the raw seams in her characters."

== Awards and nominations ==
Nominations

- Drama Desk Award for Outstanding Play, 2009
- Drama Desk Award for Outstanding Featured Actor in a Play (Peter Friedman), 2009
- Outer Critics Circle Award, John Gassner Award, 2008-2009, Presented for an American Play, Preferably by a New Playwright
