= Nocturama =

Nocturama may refer to:

- Nocturama, or nocturnal house, a facility housing nocturnal animals
- Nocturama (album), a 2003 album by Nick Cave and the Bad Seeds
- Nocturama (play), a 2008 play by Annie Baker
- Nocturama (film), a 2016 French thriller film directed by Bertrand Bonello
