= Nicholas Kepros =

American actor (1932–2023)

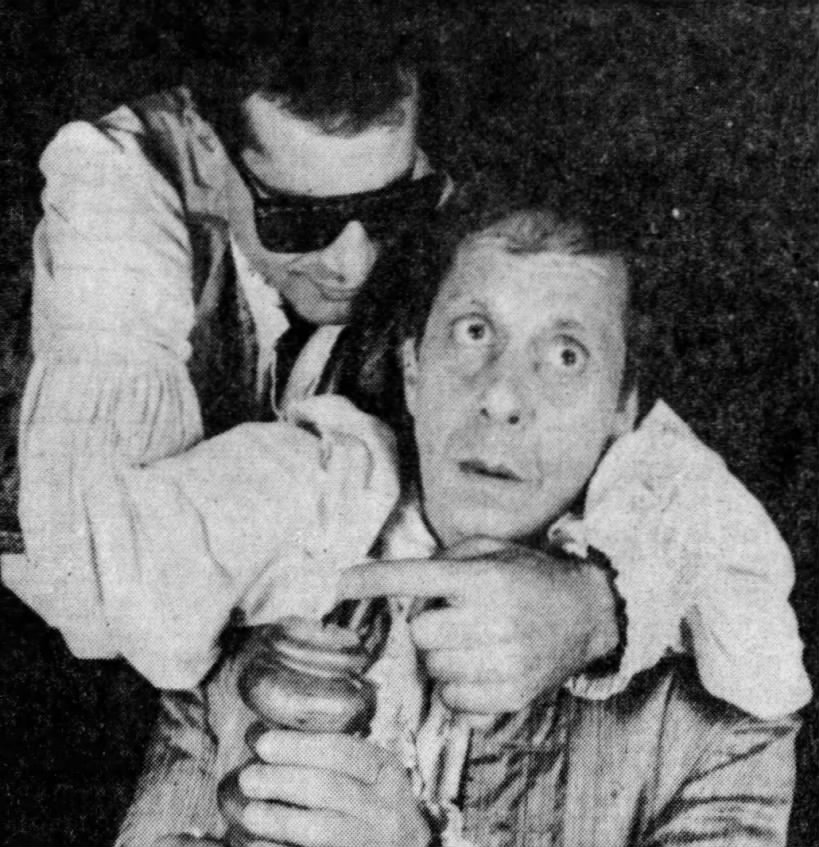
- Kepros (right) with Tony Shalhoub, 1988
- Born: November 8, 1932; Salt Lake City, Utah, U.S.
- Died: January 26, 2023 (aged 90); New York City, New York, U.S.
- Education: University of Utah
- Occupations: Film, television and theatre actor

Nicholas Kepros (November 8, 1932 – January 26, 2023) was an American film, television and theatre actor. He was known for playing the role of the Joseph II in the Broadway play Amadeus, for which he was nominated for a Drama Desk Award for Outstanding Featured Actor in a Play and as Prince-Archbishop Colloredo in its 1984 film adaptation of the same name.

== Life and career ==
Kepros was born in Salt Lake City. He attended medical school at the University of Utah.

Kepros began his career in 1958, appearing in the stage play The Golden Six. He appeared in such other plays as Saint Joan, Peer Gynt, The White Rose and the Red, The Plough and the Stars, Henry IV, Part 1, Henry IV, Part II, Hamlet and Execution of Justice.

Kepros appeared in television programs including The Golden Girls, Equal Justice, You Are There, and Star Trek: The Next Generation, and also in films such as The Associate, Amadeus, Identity Crisis and Quiz Show.

Kepros died on January 26, 2023, in New York City, at the age of 90.
