= Janet Planet =

2023 film by Annie Baker

- Theatrical release poster
- Directed by: Annie Baker
- Written by: Annie Baker
- Produced by: Dan Janvey; Derrick Tseng; Annie Baker; Andrew Goldman
- Starring: Julianne Nicholson; Zoe Ziegler; Elias Koteas; Will Patton; Sophie Okonedo
- Cinematography: Maria von Hausswolff
- Edited by: Lucian Johnston
- Production companies: A24; BBC Film; Present Company
- Distributed by: A24
- Release dates: September 1, 2023 (Telluride); June 21, 2024 (United States)
- Running time: 113 minutes
- Country: United States
- Language: English
- Box office: $805,694

Janet Planet is a 2023 American coming-of-age drama film written and directed by Annie Baker in her directorial debut. It stars Julianne Nicholson, Zoe Ziegler, Elias Koteas, Will Patton, and Sophie Okonedo. It follows a single mother and her young daughter who navigate their complex relationships in 1990s rural Massachusetts.

The film had its world premiere at the 50th Telluride Film Festival on September 1, 2023, and was given a limited theatrical release in the United States on June 21, 2024, by A24. It received positive reviews from critics, who praised Baker's direction and screenplay and Ziegler's performance. At the 40th Independent Spirit Awards, it earned three nominations: Best First Feature, Best First Screenplay, and Best Cinematography.

== Plot ==
In 1991, Lacy is an 11-year-old girl who lives in western Massachusetts with her single mother, Janet, an acupuncturist to whom she is very close. At summer camp, Lacy calls her mother at night and matter-of-factly tells her that she will kill herself if she doesn't pick her up, but regrets the decision after a friendly interaction with two of her fellow campers.

Janet is dating Wayne, a taciturn man prone to odd behavior and migraines. Lacy befriends Wayne's daughter, Sequoia, after a trip to the mall, but dislikes Wayne himself. During one of his migraines, Lacy pesters Wayne until he charges at her; later, Janet asks her what to do, and Lacy suggests that she break up with Wayne.

After breaking up with Wayne, Janet and Lacy attend a performance by a troupe of actors led by Avi, a charismatic spiritual leader who lives with his troupe in a commune. Janet recognizes one of the actors as an old friend of hers, Regina, who leaves the commune and moves in with Janet. Lacy is friendlier with the free-spirited Regina than she was with Wayne, but tension arises between Janet and Regina over their worldviews. Eventually, Avi visits and takes Regina back to the commune. Janet soon begins seeing him.

On the first day of sixth grade, Lacy is stricken by a headache; despite her mistrust of antibiotics, Janet acquires them from a pharmacy for Lacy's sake before going on a date with Avi. They hike and have a picnic, and he reads her poetry. Suddenly he disappears, and Janet drives home alone.

Lacy recovers from her illness and begins attending middle school. In the fall, Janet and Lacy attend a contra dance. Lacy is asked whether she wants to dance and declines. She watches her mother from a distance. Her mother then disappears into the dance crowd as a man sits down and asks Lacy if she is okay, then invites her to dance. She declines again, with an ambiguous expression.

== Cast ==
- Julianne Nicholson as Janet, an acupuncturist
- Zoe Ziegler as Lacy, Janet's 11-year-old daughter
- Elias Koteas as Avi, a theatre group leader
- Sophie Okonedo as Regina, Janet's friend
- Will Patton as Wayne, Janet's boyfriend
- Mary Shultz as Davina
- Edie Moon Kearns as Sequoia
- June Walker Grossman as Susanna
- Abby Harri as Emily

== Release ==
Janet Planet had its world premiere at the 50th Telluride Film Festival. It also screened at the 2023 New York Film Festival and the 74th Berlin International Film Festival in the Panorama section.

The film was released in the United States on June 21, 2024.

== Reception ==
On the review aggregator website Rotten Tomatoes, 84% of 130 critics' reviews are positive, with an average rating of 7.5/10. The website's consensus reads: "Unfolding at a gentle pace with an even more subdued sense of drama, Janet Planet revolves around Julianne Nicholson and Zoe Ziegler's outstanding performances." Metacritic, which uses a weighted average, assigned the film a score of 83 out of 100, based on 36 critics, indicating "universal acclaim".

Filmmakers Joanna Arnow, R. J. Cutler, Lena Dunham, and Savanah Leaf cited Janet Planet as one of their favorite films of 2024.
