= Meet the Cartozians =

2025 play

- 2025 Off-Broadway production poster
- Original language: English
- Written by: Talene Monahon
- Genre: Comedy

Premiere
- Date: October 29, 2025
- Place: Second Stage Theatre

Meet the Cartozians is a comedic 2025 play by Talene Monahon. The play premiered off-Broadway at the Irene Diamond Stage at Pershing Square Signature Center in October 2025, directed by David Cromer. The play deals with themes of racial and cultural identity in America, and was a finalist for the Pulitzer Prize for Drama.

The play is loosely based on a real court case decided in 1925 when the Armenian man Tartos Cartozian had his U.S. citizenship revoked. In the first act, set in the 1920s, an Armenian American man fights to be legally recognized. In the second act, set a century later, his descendant works to develop and keep a public persona.

== Plot ==
=== Act 1 ===
In 1923, the Cartozian family meet with their Irish lawyer Wallace McCamant regarding their upcoming case before the Supreme Court. The Armenian-born Tatos Cartozian, an Oriental rug merchant living in Portland, Oregon, has lost his newly acquired citizenship due to the legal uncertainty of whether to classify Armenia as part of Europe, Asia, or the Middle East. McCamant presents the argument that they should be considered white by virtue of the word "Caucasian" referring to the Caucasus Mountains, which were originally part of Armenia. The recent events of the Armenian genocide weigh heavily on the family, who were forced to move to America as a result. McCamant argues they can win their case by hiding any aspects of their culture that would jeopardize their claim to being white, which leads to tensions among the family due to their varying skin tones and ability to grasp the English language.

=== Act 2 ===
In July 2024, a group of four Armenian-Americans gather to be interviewed in the Christmas episode of a reality television series called Meet the Cartozians (a parody of Keeping Up with the Kardashians). The plan is for them to meet "the celebrity" (parodying Kim Kardashian), a well-known reality star who is distantly related to Tatos Cartozian, on camera. While waiting for her arrival, the group and their cameraman discuss their differing relationships to their heritage, as well as whether they consider themselves white or not as a result of the 1924 United States v. Cartozian, which Tatos won and was declared white. The group's differing experiences of racism soon leads to a full-blown argument over the topic, eventually leading the cameraman to cancel the production of the episode entirely.

After most of the group has departed, "the celebrity" arrives on set to find the only remaining guest, Robert (played by the same actor as Tatos), eating some kadayif another guest had prepared. The two share the dessert while commiserating over their struggle to connect with their heritage, and the lingering trauma of displacement.

== Productions ==
=== Off-Broadway (2025) ===
Meet the Cartozians, produced by Second Stage Theater, premiered off-Broadway when it started previews on 29 October 2025. The production opened on 17 November 2025 and later extended through 14 December 2025. The cast included Raffi Barsoumian, Will Brill, Andrea Martin, Nael Nacer, Susan Pourfar, and Tamara Sevunts. The production received critical acclaim, with The New York Times calling it "captivating" and TheatreMania praising it as "genuinely great."

The show was nominated for three Drama Desk Awards, including Outstanding Play, two Outer Critics Circle Awards, winning for Outstanding New Off-Broadway Play, and was a finalist for the 2026 Pulitzer Prize for Drama.

=== Berkeley Repertory Theatre & Huntington Theatre Company (2027) ===
In April 2026, Berkeley Repertory Theatre and Huntington Theatre Company announced that they will co-produce the Boston and West Coast premieres of the play in 2027.

== Awards and nominations ==
=== Off-Broadway (2025) ===
Year	Award	Category	Nominee	Result	Ref.
2026	Drama Desk Award	Outstanding Play		Nominated	
2026	Drama Desk Award	Outstanding Scenic Design of a Play	Tatiana Kahvegian	Nominated	
2026	Drama Desk Award	Outstanding Costume Design of a Play	Enver Chakartash	Nominated	
2026	Outer Critics Circle Award	Outstanding New Off-Broadway Play		Won	
2026	Outer Critics Circle Award	Outstanding Featured Performer in an Off-Broadway Play	Andrea Martin	Nominated	
2026	Pulitzer Prize for Drama			Nominated	
