= Drama Desk Award for Outstanding Featured Actor in a Play =

Former American theater award

Drama Desk Award for Outstanding Featured Actor
- Awarded for: Outstanding Featured Actor in a Play
- Location: New York City
- Country: United States
- Presented by: Drama Desk
- First award: 1975
- Final award: 2022
- Website: dramadesk.org (defunct)

The Drama Desk Award for Outstanding Featured Actor in a Play was an annual award presented by Drama Desk in recognition of achievements in the theatre across collective Broadway, off-Broadway and off-off-Broadway productions in New York City. The award was one of eight new acting awards first presented in 1975, when Drama Desk retired an earlier award that had made no distinction between work in plays and musicals, nor between actors and actresses, nor between lead performers and featured performers.

After the 2022 ceremony, all eight acting categories introduced in 1975 were retired. The award for Outstanding Featured Actor in a Play, along with Outstanding Featured Actress in a Play, were replaced in 2023 with the gender neutral category of Outstanding Featured Performance in a Play.

== Winners and nominees ==
=== 1970s ===
Year	Actor	Play	Character
1975
1975	Frank Langella	Seascape	Leslie
1975	Louis Beachner	The National Health	Flagg
1975	Larry Blyden	Absurd Person Singular	Sidney
1975	David Dukes	Love for Love	Scandal
1975	David Dukes	Rules of the Game	Guido Venanzi
1975	Philip Locke	Sherlock Holmes	Professor Moriarty
1975	Dick Anthony Williams	Black Picture Show	Alexander
1976
1976	Judd Hirsch	Knock Knock	Various Characters
1976	Leonard Cimino	A Memory of Two Mondays	Jim
1976	Edward Herrmann	Mrs. Warren's Profession	Frank Gardner
1976	Roy Poole	A Memory of Two Mondays	Gus
1977
1977	Bob Dishy	Sly Fox	Abner Truckle
1977	Anthony Call	The Trip Back Down	Super Joe Weller
1977	Héctor Elizondo	Sly Fox	Simon Able
1977	Michael Lombard	Otherwise Engaged	Artemy Zemlyanik
1977	Everett McGill	Lu Ann Hampton Laverly Oberlander	Dale Laverty
1977	Ralph Roberts	The Oldest Living Graduate	Mike Tremaine
1978
1978	Morgan Freeman	The Mighty Gents	Zeke
1978	Jeffrey DeMunn	A Prayer for My Daughter	Jack Delasante
1978	Visili Bogazianos	P.S. Your Cat Is Dead	Vrro
1978	Jerome Dempsey	Dracula	Abraham Van Helsing
1978	George Dzundza	A Prayer for My Daughter	Kelly
1978	Michael Higgins	Molly	Teddy
1978	Lester Rawlins	Da	Drumm
1979
1979	George Rose	The Kingfisher	Hawkins
1979	Michael Gough	Bedroom Farce	Ernest
1979	I.M. Hobson	The Elephant Man	Various Characters
1979	Nicholas Woodeson	Man and Superman	Henry Straker

=== 1980s ===
Year	Actor	Play	Character
1980
1980	David Rounds	Morning's at Seven	Homer Bolton
1980	David Dukes	Bent	Horst
1980	Michael Gross	Bent	Greta
1980	Doug McClure	The Roast	Charles Browning
1980	Hansford Rowe	Nuts	Arthur Kirk
1980	Fritz Weaver	The Price	Walter Franz
1981
1981	Brian Backer	The Floating Light Bulb	Paul Pollack
1981	Ralph Clanton	The Winslow Boy	Arthur Winslow
1981	Roderick Cook	The Man Who Came to Dinner	Beverly Carlton
1981	Jeff Daniels	Fifth of July	Jed Jenkins
1981	Nicholas Kepros	Amadeus	Joseph II, Holy Roman Emperor
1981	John Shea	American Days	Don Sherman
1982
1982	Adolph Caesar	A Soldier's Play	Sergeant Waters
1982	Željko Ivanek	Cloud Nine	Betty / Gerry
1982	Matthew Broderick	Torch Song Trilogy	David
1982	Bill Moor	Potsdam Quartet	John Healey
1982	Mandy Patinkin	Henry IV	Hotspur
1982	Larry Riley	A Soldier's Play	Private C.J. Memphis
1983
1983	Alan Feinstein	A View from the Bridge	Marco
1983	Stephen Joyce	The Caine Mutiny Court-Martial	Captain Blakely
1983	Nathan Lane	Present Laughter	Roland Maule
1983	Frank Maraden	The Workroom	First Presser
1983	Stephen Moore	All's Well that Ends Well	Captain Parolles
1983	Michael Moriarty	The Caine Mutiny Court-Martial	Lt. Com. Philip Francis Queeg
1983	Stephen D. Newman	The Misanthrope	Philinte
1984
1984	John Malkovich	Death of a Salesman	Biff Loman
1984	David Huddleston	Death of a Salesman	Charley
1984	Stephen Keep	A Private View	Vanek
1984	Calvin Levels	Open Admissions	Calvin Jefferson
1984	Chip Zien	Isn't It Romantic	Marty Sterling
1985
1985	Charles S. Dutton	Ma Rainey's Black Bottom	Levee
1985	Barry Miller	Biloxi Blues	Arnold Epstein
1985	Ken Kliban	As Is	Barney / Brother
1985	Edward Petherbridge	Strange Interlude	Charles Marsden
1985	David Proval	Requiem for a Heavyweight	Army Hakes
1985	Bill Sadler	Biloxi Blues	Sgt. Merwin J. Toomey
1986
1986	Joseph Maher	Loot	Truscott
1986	James Gammon	A Lie of the Mind	Baylor
1986	Donald Moffat	The Iceman Cometh	Larry Slade
1986	Anthony Rapp	Precious Sons	Freddy
1987
1987	John Randolph	Broadway Bound	Ben
1987	Michael Countryman	The Common Pursuit	Martin Musgrove
1987	Frankie R. Faison	Fences	Gabriel
1987	Peter Friedman	The Common Pursuit	Humphry Taylor
1987	Ray Gill	Driving Miss Daisy	Boolie Werthan
1987	Tony Jay	The Life and Adventures of Nicholas Nickleby	Mr. Vincent Crummles / Walter Bray
1988
1988	BD Wong	M. Butterfly	Song Liling
1988	Athol Fugard	The Road to Mecca	Rev. Marius Byleveld
1988	Michael Gough	Breaking the Code	Dillwyn Knox
1988	Joe Grifasi	The Boys Next Door	Arnold Wiggins
1988	Ed Hall	Joe Turner's Come and Gone	Bynum Walker
1988	Lou Liberatore	Burn This	Larry
1989
1989	Peter Frechette	Eastern Standard	Drew
1989	Fyvush Finkel	Café Crown	Sam
1989	Bill Irwin	Waiting for Godot	Lucky
1989	Edmund Lewis	Without Apologies	Willie Jukes
1989	Matt McGrath	Dalton's Back	Dalty Possil
1989	Eric Stoltz	Our Town	George Gibbs
1989	Gordon Joseph Weiss	Ghetto	The Dummy

=== 1990s ===
Year	Actor	Play	Character
1990
1990	Charles Durning	Cat on a Hot Tin Roof	Big Daddy
1990	Rocky Carroll	The Piano Lesson	Lymon
1990	Simon Jones	Privates on Parade	Giles Flack
1990	Francis Guinan	The Grapes of Wrath	Various Characters
1990	Dustin Hoffman	The Merchant of Venice	Shylock
1991
1991	Kevin Spacey	Lost in Yonkers	"Uncle" Louie
1991	Dylan Baker	La Bête	Prince Conty
1991	Marcus Chong	Stand-Up Tragedy	Lee Cortez
1991	Leland Gantt	Let Me Live	Dupree
1991	Josef Sommer	Hamlet	Polonius
1992
1992	Laurence Fishburne	Two Trains Running	Sterling
1992	Giancarlo Esposito	Distant Fires	Performer
1992	Željko Ivanek	Two Shakespearean Actors	John Ryder
1992	Mark Rosenthal	Marvin's Room	Hank
1993
1993	Joe Mantello	Angels in America: Millennium Approaches	Louis Ironson
1993	Stephen Spinella	Angels in America: Millennium Approaches	Prior Walter
1993	David Marshall Grant	Angels in America: Millennium Approaches	Joe Pitt / Prior 1 / The Eskimo
1993	Robert Klein	The Sisters Rosensweig	Mervyn Kant
1993	Eli Wallach	The Price	Gregory Solomon
1994
1994	Jeffrey Wright	Angels in America: Perestroika	Mr. Lies / Belize
1994	Marcus D'Amico	An Inspector Calls	Eric Birling
1994	Gregory Itzin	The Kentucky Cycle	Various Characters
1994	Ron Leibman	Angels in America: Perestroika	Roy Cohn
1994	Christopher McCann	The Lights	Erenhart
1995
1995	Nathan Lane	Love! Valour! Compassion!	Buzz Hauser
1995	Simon Coates	As You Like It	Celia
1995	John Glover	Love! Valour! Compassion!	John and James Jeckyll
1995	Kevin Kilner	The Glass Menagerie	Jim O'Connor
1995	Anthony LaPaglia	The Rose Tattoo	Alvaro Mangiacavallo
1995	Alessandro Nivola	A Month in the Country	Beliaev
1996
1996	Martin Shaw	An Ideal Husband	Lord Arthur Goring
1996	Heavy D	Riff Raff	Tony
1996	James Gammon	Buried Child	Dodge
1996	Alfred Molina	Molly Sweeney	Lord Goring
1996	Reg Rogers	Holiday	Ned Seton
1996	Ruben Santiago-Hudson	Seven Guitars	Canewell
1997
1997	Brian Murray	The Little Foxes	Benjamin
1997	Kirk Acevedo	Tooth of Crime (Second Dance)	Crow
1997	Billy Crudup	Three Sisters	Solyony
1997	David Greenspan	The Boys in the Band	Harold
1997	Edward Herrmann	Psychopathia Sexualis	Dr. Block
1997	Christopher Evan Welch	Scapin	Silvestre
1998
1998	Alfred Molina	'Art'	Yvan
1998	Adam Alexi-Malle	Goose-Pimples	Muhammad
1998	Ruaidhri Conroy	The Cripple of Inishmaan	Billy Claven
1998	Ron Leibman	A Dybbuk, or Between Two Worlds	Rabbi Azriel
1998	Max Wright	Ivanov	Pavel Lebedev
1998	Harris Yulin	The Diary of Anne Frank	Mr. Van Daan
1999
1999	Kevin Anderson	Death of a Salesman	Biff
1999	Peter Bartlett	The Most Fabulous Story Ever Told	Various Characters
1999	James Black	Not About Nightingales	Butch O'Fallon
1999	Paul Giamatti	The Iceman Cometh	James Cameron
1999	Ciarán Hinds	Closer	Larry
1999	Howard Witt	Death of a Salesman	Charley

=== 2000s ===
Year	Actor	Play	Character
2000
2000	Roy Dotrice	A Moon for the Misbegotten	Phil Hogan
2000	Matthew Arkin	Dinner with Friends	Gabe
2000	Joel Grey	Give Me Your Answer, Do!	Jack Donovan
2000	Philip Seymour Hoffman	The Author's Voice	Gene
2000	Brian Murray	Uncle Vanya	Alexander Vladimirovich Serebryakov
2000	Harris Yulin	The Price	Walter Franz
2001
2001	Charles Brown	King Hedley II	Elmore
2001	Oliver Ford Davies	Richard II	Duke of York
2001	Aaron Himelstein	The Dead Eye Boy	Soren
2001	Justin Kirk	Ten Unknowns	Judd Burgess
2001	Maximilian Schell	Judgment at Nuremberg	Dr. Ernst Janning
2001	Lewis J. Stadlen	The Man Who Came to Dinner	Banjo
2002
2002	Frank Langella	Fortune's Fool	Flegont Alexandrovitch Tropatchov
2002	Will LeBow	Nocturne	Father
2002	Brian Murray	The Crucible	Deputy Governor Thomas Danforth
2002	Keith Nobbs	Four	June
2002	Sam Robards	The Man Who Had All the Luck	Gustav Eberson
2002	David Warner	Major Barbara	Andrew Undershaft
2003
2003	Denis O'Hare	Take Me Out	Mason Marzak
2003	Simon Russell Beale	Twelfth Night	Malvolio
2003	Walter Bobbie	Polish Joke	Various Characters
2003	Philip Seymour Hoffman	Long Day's Journey into Night	James "Jamie", Jr.
2003	T. R. Knight	Scattergood	Brendan Hillard
2003	Frederick Weller	Take Me Out	Shane Mungitt
2004
2004	Ned Beatty	Cat on a Hot Tin Roof	Big Daddy
2004	Michael Berry	Moby Dick	Starbuck
2004	André De Shields	Prymate	Graham
2004	Aidan Gillen	The Caretaker	Mick
2004	John Lithgow	Mrs. Farnsworth	Mr. Farnsworth
2004	Corey Stoll	Intimate Apparel	Mr. Marks
2005
2005	Michael Stuhlbarg	The Pillowman	Michal
2005	Philip Bosco	Twelve Angry Men	Juror 3
2005	Larry Bryggman	Romance	The Judge
2005	Jeff Goldblum	The Pillowman	Tupolski
2005	Josh Hamilton	Hurlyburly	Mickey
2005	Paul Sparks	Orange Flower Water	Brad
2006
2006	Samuel Barnett	The History Boys	David Posner
2006	Devon Abner	The Trip to Bountiful	Ludie Watts
2006	Dominic Cooper	The History Boys	Dakin
2006	Jason Butler Harner	The Paris Letter	Young Anton / Burt Sarris
2006	Stephen Campbell Moore	The History Boys	Irwin
2006	David Pittu	Celebration and The Room	Mr. Sands / Waiter
2007
2007	Boyd Gaines	Journey's End	Lieut. Osborne
2007	Anthony Chisholm	Radio Golf	Elder Joseph Barlow
2007	Billy Crudup	The Coast of Utopia	Vissarion Belinsky
2007	John Ortiz	Jack Goes Boating	Clyde
2007	Andrew Polk	The Accomplices	Samuel Merlin / John Pehle / Emanuel Celler
2007	Fred Weller	Some Men	Various Characters
2008
2008	Conleth Hill	The Seafarer	Ivan Curry
2008	John Cullum	The Conscientious Objector	Lyndon B. Johnson
2008	Francis Jue	Yellow Face	Various Characters
2008	Arian Moayed	Masked	Na'im
2008	Jeff Perry	August: Osage County	Bill Fordham
2008	Michael T. Weiss	Scarcity	Herb
2009
2009	Pablo Schreiber	reasons to be pretty	Kent
2009	Brian d'Arcy James	Port Authority	Dermot
2009	Jeremy Davidson	Back Back Back	Kent
2009	Peter Friedman	Body Awareness	Frank
2009	Ethan Hawke	The Winter's Tale	Autolycus
2009	Jeremy Shamos	Animals Out of Paper	Andy

=== 2010s ===
Year	Actor	Play	Character
2010
2010	Santino Fontana	Brighton Beach Memoirs	Stanley Jerome
2010	Chris Chalk	Fences	Corey
2010	Sean Dugan	Next Fall	Brandon
2010	Adam James	The Pride	The Man / Peter / The Doctor
2010	Hamish Linklater	Twelfth Night	Sir Andrew Aguecheek
2010	Nick Westrate	The Boys in the Band	Donald
2011
2011	Brian Bedford	The Importance of Being Earnest	Lady Bracknell
2011	Christian Borle	Peter and the Starcatcher	Black Stache
2011	Boyd Gaines	The Grand Manner	Guthrie McClintic
2011	Logan Marshall-Green	The Hallway Trilogy	Lloyd Boyd
2011	Zachary Quinto	Angels in America: Millennium Approaches	Louis Ironson
2011	Tom Riley	Arcadia	Septimus Hodge
2011	Yul Vázquez	The Motherf**ker with the Hat	Cousin Julio
2012
2012	Tom Edden	One Man, Two Guvnors	Alfie
2012	Bill Camp	Death of a Salesman	Charley
2012	Jim Dale	The Road to Mecca	Marius Byleveld
2012	Bill Irwin	King Lear	Lear's Fool
2012	Jefferson Mays	Blood and Gifts	Simon Craig
2012	Will Rogers	Unnatural Acts	Joseph Lumbard
2012	Morgan Spector	Russian Transport	Boris
2013
2013	Richard Kind	The Big Knife	Marcus Hoff
2013	Chuck Cooper	The Piano Lesson	Wining Boy
2013	Peter Friedman	The Great God Pan	Doug
2013	Aaron Clifton Moten	The Flick	Avery
2013	Brían F. O'Byrne	If There Is I Haven't Found It Yet	George
2013	Tony Shalhoub	Golden Boy	Mr. Bonaparte
2014
2014	Reed Birney	Casa Valentina	Charlotte
2014	Chuck Cooper	Choir Boy	Headmaster Marrow
2014	Peter Maloney	Outside Mullingar	Tony Reilly
2014	Bobby Moreno	Year of the Rooster	Odysseus Rex
2014	Bill Pullman	The Jacksonian	Fred
2014	Brian J. Smith	The Glass Menagerie	Jim O'Connor
2015
2015	K. Todd Freeman	Airline Highway	Sissy Na Na
2015	F. Murray Abraham	It's Only a Play	Ira Drew
2015	Reed Birney	You Got Older	Father
2015	Jonathan Hadary	Rocket to the Moon	Mr. Prince
2015	Jason Butler Harner	The Village Bike	John
2015	Jonathan Hogan	Pocatello	Cole
2015	José Joaquín Pérez	My Mañana Comes	Jorge
2016
2016	Michael Shannon	Long Day's Journey into Night	James Tyrone Jr.
2016	Bill Camp	The Crucible	Reverend John Hale
2016	David Furr	Noises Off	Gary Lejeune
2016	Matt McGrath	The Legend of Georgia McBride	Tracy Mills
2016	Richard Thomas	Incident At Vichy	Von Berg
2017
2017	Danny DeVito	The Price	Gregory Solomon
2017	Michael Aronov	Oslo	Uri Savir
2017	Nathan Lane	The Front Page	Walter Burns
2017	Jeremy Shamos	If I Forget	Michael Fischer
2017	Justice Smith	Yen	Bobbie
2018
2018	Nathan Lane	Angels in America	Roy Cohn
2018	Anthony Boyle	Harry Potter and the Cursed Child	Scorpius Malfoy
2018	Ben Edelman	Admissions	Charlie Luther Mason
2018	Brian Tyree Henry	Lobby Hero	William
2018	David Morse	The Iceman Cometh	Larry Slade
2018	Gregg Mozgala	Cost of Living	John
2019
2019	Tom Glynn-Carney	The Ferryman	Shane Corcoran
2019	Charles Browning	Fairview	Dayton
2019	Arnie Burton	Lewiston/Clarkston	Connor
2019	Hampton Fluker	Arthur Miller's All My Sons	George Deever
2019	Brandon Uranowitz	Burn This	Larry

=== 2020s ===
Year	Actor	Play	Character
2020
2020	Paul Hilton	The Inheritance	Morgan / Walter Poole
2020	Victor Almanzar	Halfway Bitches Go Straight to Heaven	Joey Fresco
2020	Esteban Andres Cruz	Halfway Bitches Go Straight to Heaven	Venus Ramirez
2020	David Alan Grier	A Soldier's Play	Sergeant Vernon C. Waters
2020	Chris Perfetti	Moscow Moscow Moscow Moscow Moscow Moscow	Masha
2021	No awards: New York theatres shuttered, March 2020 to September 2021, due to the COVID-19 pandemic in New York City		
2022
2022	Ron Cephas Jones	Clyde's	Montrellous
2022	Joshua Boone	Skeleton Crew	Dez
2022	Chuck Cooper	Trouble in Mind	Sheldon Forrester
2022	Daniel K. Isaac	The Chinese Lady	Atung
2022	Billy Eugene Jones	On Sugarland	Saul

== Multiple wins ==
2 wins

- Nathan Lane
- Frank Langella

== Multiple nominations ==
4 nominations

- Nathan Lane

3 nominations

- David Dukes
- Peter Friedman
- Brian Murray
- Chuck Cooper

2 nominations

- Edward Herrmann
- Michael Gough
- Željko Ivanek
- James Gammon
- Bill Irwin
- Matt McGrath
- Ron Leibman
- Alfred Molina
- Billy Crudup
- Harris Yulin
- Philip Seymour Hoffman
- Frederick Weller
- Jason Butler Harner
- Boyd Gaines
- Jeremy Shamos
- Bill Camp
- Reed Birney

== See also ==
- Laurence Olivier Award for Best Actor in a Supporting Role
- Tony Award for Best Featured Actor in a Play
