= Ben Edelman =

American actor and producer

- Education: Carnegie Mellon University (BFA)
- Occupations: Actor; producer

Ben Edelman is an American actor and producer. He originated the role of Charlie Luther Mason in Joshua Harmon's Admissions at Lincoln Center Theater in 2018, for which he received an Obie Award for performance and the Dorothy Loudon Award for Excellence in the Theater, and was nominated for the Drama Desk Award for Outstanding Featured Actor in a Play. In 2023, he alternated in the role of poet Max Ritvo in Sarah Ruhl's Letters from Max, a ritual and received a second Drama Desk nomination, shared with Zane Pais and Sinan Refik Zafar, for Outstanding Music in a Play. Edelman also produced the documentary feature Your Friend, Memphis, which premiered at the 2022 South by Southwest festival.

== Early life and education ==
Edelman grew up in Lower Merion Township, Pennsylvania, a suburb of Philadelphia. He developed an interest in acting while attending a summer camp where he participated in theatre, music, magic, and other performance activities.

Edelman earned a Bachelor of Fine Arts in acting from Carnegie Mellon University. Between his first and second years there, he studied at the British American Drama Academy in Oxford, England.

== Career ==
=== Theatre ===
After graduating, Edelman served as understudy for the central role of Jordan Berman in the Roundabout Theatre Company's Off-Broadway production of Joshua Harmon's Significant Other and its 2017 Broadway transfer to the Booth Theatre.

In 2017, Edelman played Danny Saunders in a four-actor production of The Chosen at Long Wharf Theatre, adapted by Aaron Posner and Chaim Potok. Critics praised the cast, and Arts Paper singled out Edelman's performance as the Hasidic teenager.

Edelman played Charlie, a white prep-school student whose rejection from Yale tests his parents' progressive ideals, in the 2018 world premiere of Admissions at Lincoln Center Theater. Daniel Aukin directed a cast that also included Jessica Hecht, Andrew Garman, Ann McDonough, and Sally Murphy. Critics paid particular attention to Edelman's extended monologues: reviews in Vulture, The Daily Beast, The Hollywood Reporter, and New York Stage Review described his performance favorably.

For Admissions, Edelman received a 2018 Obie Award for performance and the Dorothy Loudon Award for Excellence in the Theater. He was also nominated for the Drama Desk Award for Outstanding Featured Actor in a Play. He reprised the role in the play's 2019 West End production at Trafalgar Studios, becoming the only member of the New York cast to transfer with the production. Reviewing the London staging for The Guardian, Michael Billington found Edelman's later work than his opening monologue most effective.

In 2022, Edelman appeared as Baal, the former husband of playwright-performer Liba Vaynberg's character, in the world premiere of The Gett at Rattlestick Theater.

The following year, he appeared with Hecht and Zane Pais in the world premiere of Ruhl's Letters from Max, a ritual at Signature Theatre Company. Edelman and Pais alternated as Ritvo and as a supporting angel figure; the actor not playing Ritvo supplied live musical accompaniment. Edelman performed on piano, and he, Pais, and sound designer Sinan Refik Zafar developed original music for the production. Reviews in Time Out New York and New York Stage Review praised aspects of his interpretation, with the latter describing his readings of Ritvo's poems as electric. Edelman, Pais, and Zafar were nominated for the 2023 Drama Desk Award for Outstanding Music in a Play.

=== Screen work and producing ===
Edelman's television work has included guest appearances in The Good Wife, BrainDead, and Instinct.

Edelman and Luke Terrell produced David P. Zucker's documentary feature Your Friend, Memphis, which follows a young filmmaker with cerebral palsy seeking independence. The film had its world premiere in the Documentary Spotlight program at the 2022 South by Southwest festival and was subsequently distributed by Greenwich Entertainment.

== Awards and nominations ==
Year	Award	Category	Work	Result
2018	Drama Desk Award	Outstanding Featured Actor in a Play	Admissions	Nominated
2018	Obie Award	Performance	Admissions	Won
2018	Dorothy Loudon Award	Excellence in the Theater	Admissions	Won
2023	Drama Desk Award	Outstanding Music in a Play	Letters from Max, a ritual	Nominated
