= Infinite Life (play) =

Infinite Life is a play by Annie Baker which premiered in 2023. Infinite Life was slated to premiere in 2021 but opened in 2023 at the Atlantic Theater Company, in a production prepared in collaboration with the National Theatre of London, which is where the show continued its run after leaving the Linda Gross theater in New York.

== Plot ==
The play is about five women – four of them are in their 60s, one is 47 – staying at a health retreat in Northern California. The play takes place in May, 2019 and shows their interaction during various treatments and wellness programs which involve fasting. One of the characters reads Daniel Deronda, others engage in philosophical conversation, some indulge in intense sexual fantasies, and others drink exotic juices.

There is one minor role for a man.

== Publication ==
Part of the play was printed in The Paris Review's Winter 2021 issue.

== Reviews ==
As The Guardian's reviewer summarized, "by wrapping up their discomfort in language and submitting to treatment meted out by the overseeing doctor [...], the women can liberate themselves by starving and articulating away their pain."

Writing for The New York Times, Darryn King stated that it "is a play about the experience of pain — our own and each other’s. “Infinite Life” also goes further than Baker's other plays in its exploration of stillness."

The critic for the Los Angeles Times wrote that the play is notable for "the accuracy of behavioral observation and the quality of empathy." Lauren Mechling of The Guardian called the play "often mesmerizing and undeniably audacious."
