= Annie Baker =

American playwright and teacher

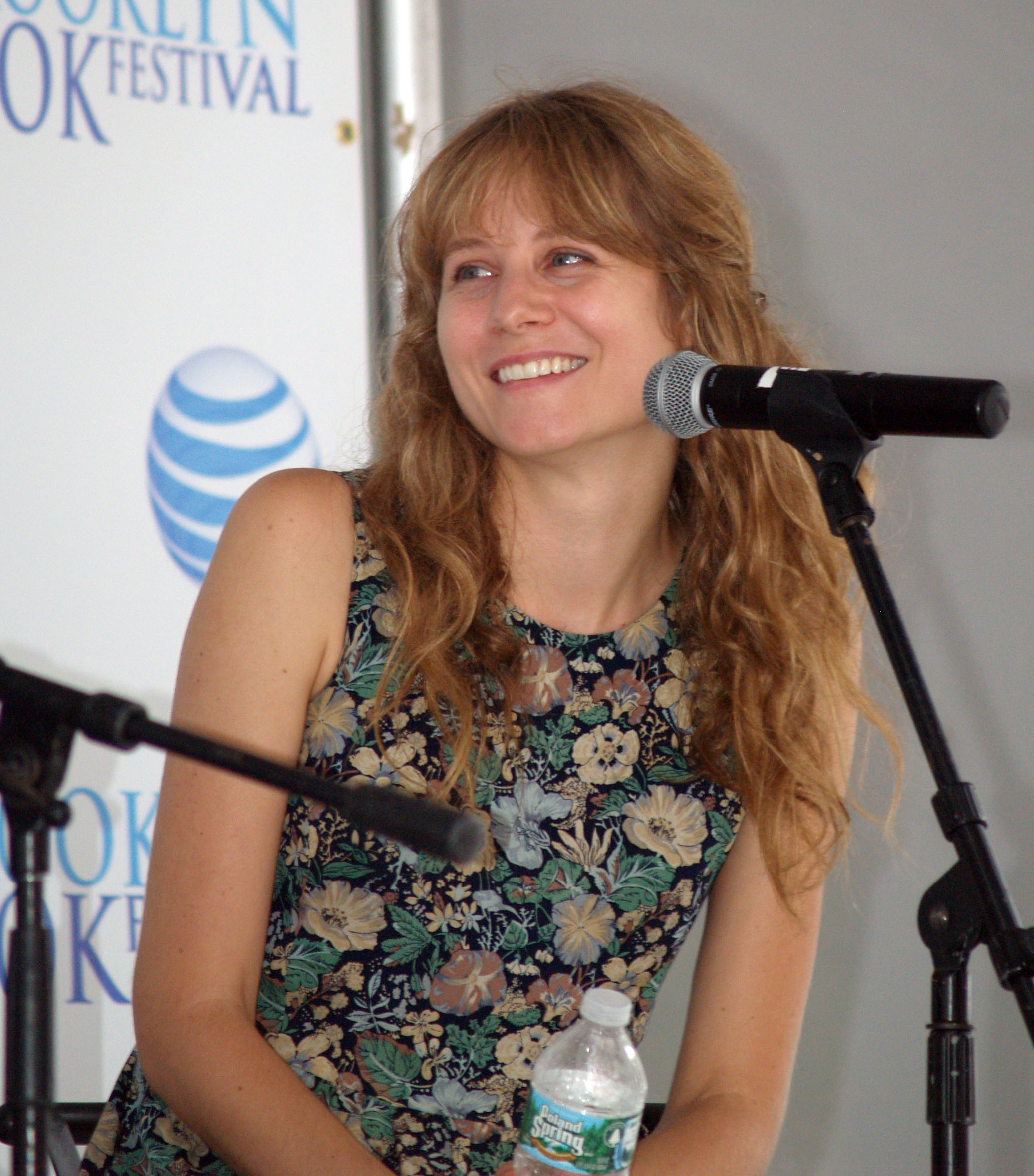
- Baker at the 2014; Brooklyn Book Festival
- Born: April 1981 (age 45); Cambridge, Massachusetts, U.S.
- Education: New York University (BFA); Brooklyn College (MFA)
- Occupations: Playwright, teacher
- Spouse: Nico Baumbach
- Children: 1
- Writing career
- Notable works: Body Awareness (2008); Circle Mirror Transformation (2009); The Aliens (2010); The Flick (2013); John (2015); Janet Planet (2023)
- Notable awards: Pulitzer Prize for Drama; Steinberg Playwright Award

Annie Baker (born April 1981) is an American playwright and film director. She is known for her play The Flick (2013), which won the Pulitzer Prize for Drama. She has written a series of plays set in the fictional town of Shirley: Body Awareness (2008), Circle Mirror Transformation (2009), The Aliens (2010), and Nocturama (2014). She made her feature film directorial debut with the A24 coming-of-age drama Janet Planet (2023).

== Early life and education ==
Baker's family lived in Cambridge, Massachusetts, when Baker was born, but soon moved to Amherst, Massachusetts, where she grew up and where her father, Conn Nugent, was an administrator for the Five Colleges consortium and her mother, Linda Baker, was a psychology doctoral student. Baker’s father is Irish Catholic, and her mother is Jewish. Her brother is author Benjamin Baker Nugent. Baker graduated from the Department of Dramatic Writing at New York University's Tisch School of the Arts. She earned her Master of Fine Arts degree in playwriting from Brooklyn College in 2009. One of her early jobs was as a guest-wrangler helping to oversee contestants on the reality-television program The Bachelor.

== Career ==
=== 2008–2012: Early works ===
Body Awareness, Baker's first play produced off-Broadway, was staged by the Atlantic Theater Company in 2008 and featured JoBeth Williams. Circle Mirror Transformation premiered off-Broadway at Playwrights Horizons in 2009 and received the Obie Award for Best New American Play and Performance.

In 2010, three Boston theatre companies produced Baker's three plays set in the fictional town of Shirley, Vermont: Circle Mirror Transformation, produced by the Huntington Theatre Company, Body Awareness, produced by SpeakEasy Stage Company, and The Aliens, produced by Company One.

The Aliens, which premiered off-Broadway at Rattlestick Playwrights Theater in April 2010, was a finalist for the 2010 Susan Smith Blackburn Prize and shared the 2010 Obie Award for Best New American Play with Circle Mirror Transformation. Her adaptation of Anton Chekhov's Uncle Vanya premiered at the Soho Repertory Theatre in June 2012, running through August 26, and was called a "funky, fresh new production" by The New York Times. Directed by Sam Gold, the cast featured Reed Birney (Vanya), Maria Dizzia, Georgia Engel, Peter Friedman, Michael Shannon (Astrov), Rebecca Schull, and Merritt Wever (Sonya). Shannon and Wever received the 2012 Joe A. Callaway Award for their performances.

=== 2013–2019: The Flick and other plays ===
The Flick premiered at Playwrights Horizons in March 2013, and received the Obie Award for Playwriting in 2013. It won the 2014 Pulitzer Prize for Drama and the 2016 Critics' Circle Theatre Award for Best New Play.

John opened in previews off-Broadway at the Signature Theatre on July 22, 2015. It was directed by Sam Gold and starred Georgia Engel and Lois Smith. The play ran to September 6. This was the fifth time that Baker and Gold had worked together since Circle Mirror Transformation in 2009. The play is set in a bed and breakfast in Gettysburg, Pennsylvania. Time ranked it eighth on its list of Top Ten Plays and Musicals for 2015. It was also eighth on The Hollywood Reporter's "Best New York Theater of 2015" list. In The New York Times, Charles Isherwood called John a "haunting and haunted meditation on topics she has made so singularly her own: the omnipresence of loneliness in human life, and the troubled search for love and lasting connection."

John was nominated for the 2016 Lucille Lortel Awards, Outstanding Play; Outstanding Lead Actress in a Play (Engel); Outstanding Featured Actress in a Play (Smith); Outstanding Scenic Design (Mimi Lien); and Outstanding Lighting Design (Mark Barton). John received six 2016 Drama Desk Award nominations: Outstanding Play; Outstanding Actress in a Play (Engel); Outstanding Director of a Play; Outstanding Set Design for a Play (Lien); Outstanding Lighting Design for a Play (Barton); and Outstanding Sound Design in a Play (Bray Poor). John won the 2016 Obie Awards for Performance for Engel and a Special Citations: Collaboration, for Baker, Gold, and the design team.

Baker's The Antipodes premiered off-Broadway at the Signature Theatre Company with previews on April 4, 2017; it opened on April 23, directed by Lila Neugebauer. The cast featured Phillip James Brannon, Josh Charles, Josh Hamilton, Danny Mastrogiorgio, Danny McCarthy, Emily Cass McDonnell, Brian Miskell, Will Patton, and Nicole Rodenburg. The engagement was extended to June 4. John opened in the West End at the National Theatre in January 2018. It was directed by James Macdonald and starred Marylouise Burke (Mertis) and June Watson (Genevieve). Andy Propst of Time Out ranked it the 40th-best play ever written, and it made a 2019 list by The Independent.

=== 2020–present: Directorial debut ===
In September 2023, Baker's "weird and great new play", Infinite Life, opened off-Broadway at the Atlantic Theater Company, directed by James Macdonald and featuring Christina Kirk, Mia Katigbak, Kristine Nielsen, Brenda Pressley, Marylouise Burke, and Pete Simpson. Also in 2023, Baker made her directorial film debut with the coming-of-age film Janet Planet, starring Julianne Nicholson, Zoe Zeigler, and Sophie Okonedo. The film premiered at the 50th Telluride Film Festival. David Rooney of The Hollywood Reporter called it an "exquisite debut" and "an oddball marvel". Tomris Laffly of TheWrap wrote that the film "keeps the viewer at arm’s length from both the joys and aches of tweenhood, when all you crave is to get just a step closer." Baker earned two Independent Spirit Award nominations for Best First Feature and Best First Screenplay for the film.

== Teaching ==
Baker teaches playwriting at New York University, Barnard College, and Stony Brook Southampton. She is also on the faculty of the Rita and Burton Goldberg MFA in Playwriting program of Hunter College and an Associate Professor of Practice in the MFA Playwriting/Directing program at the University of Texas at Austin.

== Personal life ==
Baker is married to Nico Baumbach, with whom she has one child. Her in-laws include Noah Baumbach and Greta Gerwig.

In 2017, Baker was among 60 artists who signed an open letter organized by Adalah-NY that called on Lincoln Center to cancel performances of a play sponsored by the Israeli government and based on a novel by David Grossman. In 2023, she and other Jewish American writers called for a ceasefire in the Gaza war in an open letter to President Joe Biden.

== Style and recognition ==
Time Out New York wrote in 2008 that Baker "creates normal individuals coping with everyday issues in their small-town lives" and that her play Body Awareness "marks the arrival of a new playwright who would seem to fit the quirky bill, but aims for sincerity instead. Even though there's goofiness aplenty in her work, [she] sticks to straightforward narrative and simple dialogue. The writing isn't superficially clever, it's smart." The New Yorker said Baker "wants life onstage to be so vivid, natural, and emotionally precise that it bleeds into the audience’s visceral experience of time and space. Drawing on the immediacy of overheard conversation, she has pioneered a style of theatre made to seem as untheatrical as possible, while using the tools of the stage to focus audience attention". The Daily Beast wrote, "Baker’s skill is to make us work hard as an audience to make our own sense of her play—the best, most enriching way to view any theatrical performance. Baker’s works are not for those who want easy, A-leads-to-B plots, and spoon-fed meanings... Baker, as all great playwrights do, is holding a mirror up to us all."

== Works ==
=== Theatre ===
As a playwright

Year	Title	Premiered Venue	Ref.
2008	Body Awareness	Atlantic Theater Company (Off-Broadway)	
2009	Circle Mirror Transformation	Playwrights Horizons (Off-Broadway)	
2010	The Aliens	Rattlestick Playwrights Theater (Off-Broadway)	
2010	Nocturama	Manhattan Theatre Club (Off-Broadway)	
2012	Uncle Vanya (adaptation)	Soho Repertory Theatre (Off-Broadway)	
2013	The Flick	Playwrights Horizons (Off-Broadway)	
2015	John	Signature Theatre Company (Off-Broadway)	
2017	The Antipodes	Signature Theatre Company (Off-Broadway)	
2023	Infinite Life	Atlantic Theatre Company (Off-Broadway)	

=== Filmography ===
Year	Title	Writer	Director	Producer	Notes	Ref.
2014	While We're Young	No	No	No	Acting role; played Elise	
2017	I Love Dick	Yes	No	Consulting	TV series Episode: "A Short History of Weird Girls"	
2023	Janet Planet	Yes	Yes	Yes	Feature film debut	

== Awards and honors ==
In 2008 Baker was one of seven playwrights selected to participate in the Sundance Institute Theatre Lab. Baker's play The Last of the Little Hours was chosen for development at the Sundance Institute's 2014 Theatre Lab to be presented in July. Baker directed the production. The play "follows the daily life of a group of Benedictine monks". Baker is part of the Signature Theatre's "Residency Five" program, which "guarantees each playwright three world-premiere productions of new plays over the course of a five-year residency." John was Baker's first play under this program. The Antipodes was her second.

Honors

- 2009 - MacDowell Colony Fellow
- 2011 - United States Artists Fellow
- 2013 - Steinberg Playwright Award
- 2013 - Susan Smith Blackburn Prize
- 2014 - Pulitzer Prize for Drama for The Flick
- 2014 - MacDowell Colony Fellow
- 2014 - Guggenheim Fellow, Creative Arts Drama & Performance Art
- 2015 - New York Public Library Cullman Center Fellow
- 2017 - MacArthur Fellow
- 2024 - Independent Spirit Award nominee for Best First Feature and Best First Screenplay
