= Sam Gold =

American theater director and actor

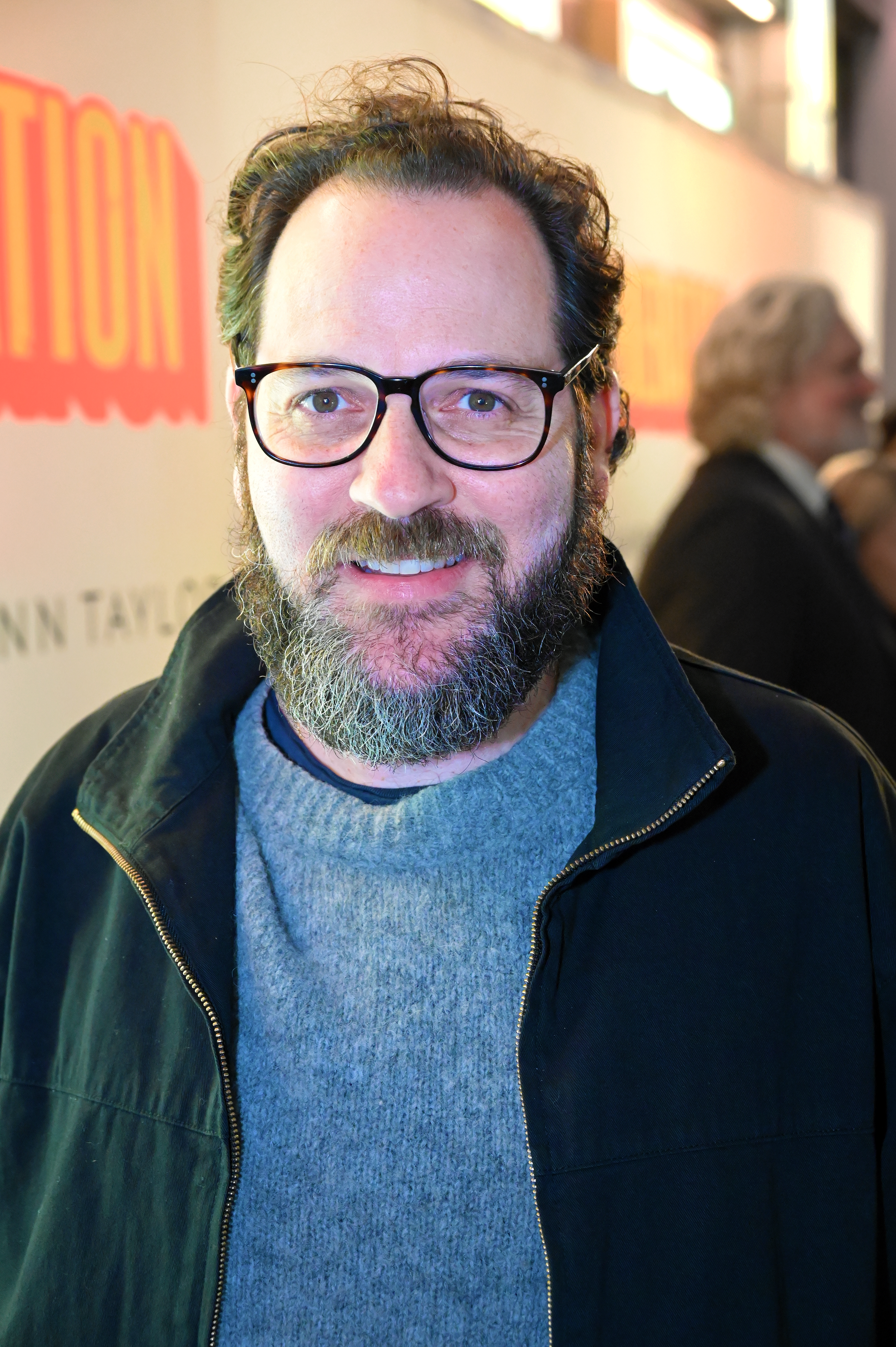
- Gold in 2025
- Born: New York City, U.S.
- Education: Cornell University (BA); Juilliard School (GrDip)
- Occupation: Director
- Known for: Fun Home
- Spouse: Amy Herzog

Sam Gold is an American theater director and actor. Having studied at Cornell University and Juilliard School he became known for directing both musicals and plays, on Broadway and Off-Broadway. He has received the Tony Award for Best Direction of a Musical, a Tony nomination for Best Direction of a Play, and nominations for four Drama Desk Awards.

He made his Broadway debut directing the Theresa Rebeck play Seminar (2011). He followed up directing the revival of the William Inge play Picnic (2013), the Will Eno play The Realistic Joneses (2014), and the Tom Stoppard play The Real Thing (2015). For the musical Fun Home (2015) he received the Tony Award for Best Direction of a Musical. He has since directed the revival of Tennessee Williams' The Glass Menagerie (2017), Lucas Hnath's A Doll's House, Part 2 (2017), and revivals of William Shakespeare's King Lear (2019), and Macbeth (2022).

== Early life and education ==
Gold was raised in Westchester and New York City. His father, Jeffrey, is an investment banker, and his mother, Lenore, is a painter. He graduated from Cornell University with a degree in English and had internships at Playwrights Horizons and the Signature Theater, and attended the directing program at the Juilliard School. He spent three years as an assistant director and dramaturge at the Wooster Group. He explained that "my career has been very focused on brand-new plays for a while. But, always, the reason I got into the theatre was because I was inspired by these classics. I was an English major and I loved the plays, so I think my work with new writers has always been based on my information from these old plays..." Gold is the Resident Director at the Roundabout Theatre Company.

== Career ==
=== 2007-2010 ===
His Off-Broadway directing work began with The Black Eyed at the New York Theatre Workshop in 2007. He directed The Big Meal by Dan LeFranc in 2012 at Playwrights Horizons and won the 2012 Lucille Lortel Award, Outstanding Director. Gold has directed five of the plays of Annie Baker: Circle Mirror Transformation in 2009, The Aliens in 2010, an adaption of Uncle Vanya in 2012,The Flick in 2013, and John in 2015. According to an article in The New York Times, "Mr. Gold and Ms. Baker are reluctant to disclose much about themselves or their work together." In 2010, he also directed a reading of her play Nocturama at the Manhattan Theatre Club.

Gold won the 2010 Obie Award, Directing, for Circle Mirror Transformation and the 2016 Special Citation Obie Award for Collaboration between Gold, Baker, and the design team. The New York Times reviewer wrote that "Sam Gold has directed with an uncommonly observant eye and ear." He was nominated for the 2016 Drama Desk Award, Outstanding Director of a Play for John. He directed The Flick in its West End (and UK) premiere at the National Theatre's Dorfman Theatre, which opened in April 2016. The CurtainUp reviewer wrote: "...as moved from page to stage by director Sam Gold and his ensemble, everything becomes remarkably and most effectively — enough so to make this a full-flavored theatrical meal.... LeFranc, like another Playwrights Horizon favorite, Annie Baker, has written exactly the kind of play that's director Sam Gold's forte. Like Baker's Circle Mirror Transformation, The Big Meal is a play in which nothing much happens, but everything does."

He directed a revival of Look Back in Anger for the Roundabout Theatre Company in 2012. David Finkle, in his review for TheaterMania of Look Back in Anger, wrote: "...there's no question the challenge director Sam Gold faced in mounting this possibly-dated work was finding an approach to the fire-brand script that would infuse it with the shock value it had at its debut. Not only has he met the test, Gold deserves a chorus of huzzahs for unmitigated audacity." He directed a staged concert presentation of The Cradle Will Rock for Encores! Off-Center in July 2013. David Finkle, reviewing for The Huffington Post, wrote: "The cast of the Encores! Off-Center concert production of Marc Blitzstein's once highly controversial first musical...are dressed in Clint Ramos's formal attire. The look, apparently chosen by the habitually iconoclastic director Sam Gold, is certainly nothing like what the original cast was intended to wear...is likely that he understands there's no point in expecting contemporary audiences to insert themselves fully into the context of the times.... That may be why Gold's presenting the work of art as simply as he does is so completely effective." In regional theatre, he directed A Doll's House at the Williamstown Theatre Festival in 2011.

=== 2011-2022 ===
On Broadway, he directed Seminar with Alan Rickman in 2011, a revival of Picnic with Reed Birney and Elizabeth Marvel in 2013 The Realistic Joneses in 2014 starring Toni Collette, Tracy Letts and Marisa Tomei, and The Real Thing in 2014 starring Maggie Gyllenhaal and Ewan McGregor. He gained attention for his direction of the musical Fun Home on Broadway in 2015, in a Public Lab at The Public Theater in October 2012, and Off-Broadway at The Public Theater in 2013. For Fun Home, he won the 2015 Tony Award, Best Direction of a Musical and 2014 Obie Award, Musical Theater.

He directed Othello at the Off-Broadway New York Theatre Workshop, opening on November 22, 2016, in previews, officially on December 12, 2016, through January 18, 2017. The play stars David Oyelowo, Daniel Craig, and Rachel Brosnahan. He directed the latest Broadway revival of The Glass Menagerie at the Belasco Theatre, which started previews on February 7, 2017. The play stars Sally Field and Joe Mantello. He also directed the new play by Lucas Hnath, A Doll's House, Part 2, which starred Laurie Metcalf and Chris Cooper and premiered on Broadway at the John Golden Theatre on April 1, 2017. It takes place 15 years after Henrik Ibsen's A Doll’s House concludes."

Gold directed a new production of William Shakespeare’s King Lear (2019) at the Cort Theatre, starring Glenda Jackson. The limited engagement began previews in March 2019 and officially opened on April 4. He also directed Macbeth starring Daniel Craig and Ruth Negga at the Longacre Theatre in 2022. Gold was set to direct an adaptation of Anton Chekov's Three Sisters starring Greta Gerwig, Oscar Isaac, Chris Messina, and Steve Buscemi at the New York Theatre Workshop. However, due to the COVID-19 pandemic the production has been suspended indefinitely. In May 2023 it was announced that Gold would return to Broadway with the Amy Herzog adaptation of the Henrik Ibsen play An Enemy of the People starring Jeremy Strong.

He is currently directing and executive producing the half-hour comedy Compliance for FX from writer Sarah Burgess and produced by Scott Rudin. It stars Mary Louise Parker and Courtney B. Vance.

On April 16, 2024, it was announced that Sam Gold will be directing a new adaptation of Romeo and Juliet, starring Rachel Zegler and Kit Connor, coming to Broadway in the fall of 2024. Jack Antonoff is providing the music.

== Theatre credits ==
As a director

| Year | Title | Playwright | Venue | Notes |
|---|---|---|---|---|
| 2007 | The Black Eyed | Betty Shamieh | New York Theatre Workshop | Off-Broadway |
| 2007 | Rag and Bone | Noah Haidle | Rattlestick Playwrights Theater | Off-Broadway |
| 2009—2010 | Circle Mirror Transformation | Annie Baker | Playwrights Horizons | Off-Broadway |
| 2010 | The Aliens | Annie Baker | Rattlestick Playwrights Theater | Off-Broadway |
| 2010 | Dusk Rings a Bell | Stephen Belber | Atlantic Theater Company | Off-Broadway |
| 2010 | Tigers Be Still | Kim Rosenstock | Roundabout Underground | Off-Broadway |
| 2010 | The Coward | Nick Jones | The Duke on 42nd Street | Off-Broadway |
| 2011 | Circle Mirror Transformation | Annie Baker | South Coast Repertory | |
| 2011 | Kin | Bathsheba Doran | Playwrights Horizons | Off-Broadway |
| 2011 | August: Osage County | Tracy Letts | The Old Globe | |
| 2011 | A Doll's House | Henrik Ibsen | Williamstown Theatre Festival | |
| 2011 | We Live Here | Zoe Kazan | New York City Center | Off-Broadway |
| 2011—2012 | Seminar | Theresa Rebeck | John Golden Theatre | Broadway |
| 2012 | Look Back in Anger | John Osborne | Laura Pels Theatre | Off-Broadway |
| 2012 | The Big Meal | Dan LeFranc | Playwrights Horizons | Off-Broadway |
| 2012 | The Realistic Joneses | Will Eno | Yale Repertory Theatre | |
| 2012 | Uncle Vanya | Anton Chekhov | Soho Repertory Theatre | Off-Broadway |
| 2012 | Seminar | Theresa Rebeck | Ahmanson Theatre | |
| 2012—2013 | Picnic | William Inge | American Airlines Theatre | Broadway |
| 2013 | The Flick | Annie Baker | Playwrights Horizons | Off-Broadway |
| 2013 | Fun Home | Lisa Kron | The Public Theater | Off-Broadway |
| 2014 | The Realistic Joneses | Will Eno | Lyceum Theatre | Broadway |
| 2014 | The Village Bike | Penelope Skinner | Lucille Lortel Theatre | Off-Broadway |
| 2014—2015 | The Real Thing | Tom Stoppard | American Airlines Theatre | Broadway |
| 2015 | The Mystery of Love and Sex | Bathsheba Doran | Lincoln Center Theater | Off-Broadway |
| 2015—2016 | Fun Home | Lisa Kron | Circle in the Square Theatre | Broadway |
| 2015—2016 | The Flick | Annie Baker | Barrow Street Theatre | Off-Broadway |
| 2015 | John | Annie Baker | Signature Theatre | Off-Broadway |
| 2015 | The Flick | Annie Baker | Royal National Theatre | |
| 2016—2017 | Othello | William Shakespeare | New York Theatre Workshop | Off-Broadway |
| 2017 | The Glass Menagerie | Tennessee Williams | Belasco Theatre | Broadway |
| 2017 | A Doll's House, Part 2 | Lucas Hnath | John Golden Theatre | Broadway |
| 2017 | Hamlet | William Shakespeare | The Public Theater | Off-Broadway |
| 2018 | Fun Home | Lisa Kron | Young Vic | |
| 2019 | King Lear | William Shakespeare | Cort Theatre | Broadway |
| 2019 | The Secret Life of Bees | Lynn Nottage | Atlantic Theater Company | Off-Broadway |
| 2022 | Macbeth | William Shakespeare | Longacre Theatre | Broadway |
| 2022 | Corsicana | Will Arbery | Playwrights Horizons | Off-Broadway |
| 2024 | An Enemy of the People | Henrik Ibsen | Circle in the Square Theatre | Broadway |
| 2024—2025 | Romeo + Juliet | William Shakespeare | Circle in the Square Theatre | Broadway |
| 2025 | Angry Alan | Penelope Skinner | Studio Seaview | Off-Broadway |

== Reception and style ==
Patrick Pacheco, in an article in The Los Angeles Times, observed: "Critical reservations have been rare in Gold's rise as one of New York's hottest and busiest young directors, ever since the media hailed his subtle and effective production of Annie Baker's Circle Mirror Transformation at Playwrights Horizons in 2009... His restless energy is reflected in the sheer breadth and versatility of his career, from a puppet musical, Jollyship the Whizbang, to classics like Threepenny Opera and A Doll's House, to any number of new plays by Zoe Kazan (We Live Here), Dan LeFranc (The Big Meal, which he will direct at Playwrights Horizons in March) and Will Eno (The Realistic Joneses at Yale Rep in April)."

Mark Kennedy noted that "Fun Home is Gold's first crack at directing a traditional musical, and it joins a list of credits that seem to have little in common.... What connects them is Gold's love of working with a group of actors, whether they're the unknowns in the cast of The Flick or A-listers .... 'Always I start with the ensemble and I try to put all of the pressure on them. I try to make these productions where the show succeeds or fails completely on their shoulders,' he says.'No net. No fancy set pieces. No directing flourishes. Nothing that can save the show if the subtlety of the performances isn't riveting.'"

== Personal life ==
Gold is Jewish. Gold has been married to playwright Amy Herzog since 2011, and the couple have two children; their elder daughter, Frances, died in 2023. According to an article in The Washington Post, Herzog and Gold had previously chosen "not to work together professionally, which is an interesting line to draw, given that Herzog often blurs the boundaries between art and actual family history;" they have since collaborated on an adaptation of the Henrik Ibsen's An Enemy of the People.

== Awards and nominations ==
| Year | Associations | Category | Project | Result | Ref. |
|---|---|---|---|---|---|
| 2015 | Tony Award | Best Direction of a Musical | Fun Home | Won | |
| 2017 | Tony Award | Best Direction of a Play | A Doll's House, Part 2 | Nominated | |
| 2010 | Drama Desk Award | Outstanding Director of a Play | Circle Mirror Transformation | Nominated | |
| 2013 | Drama Desk Award | Outstanding Director of a Play | Uncle Vanya | Nominated | |
| 2014 | Drama Desk Award | Outstanding Director of a Musical | Fun Home | Nominated | |
| 2016 | Drama Desk Award | Outstanding Director of a Play | John | Nominated | |
| 2012 | Lucille Lortel Award | Outstanding Director | The Big Meal | Won | |
| 2012 | Lucille Lortel Award | Outstanding Director | Look Back in Anger | Nominated | |
| 2013 | Lucille Lortel Award | Outstanding Director | The Flick | Nominated | |
| 2010 | Obie Award | Direction | Circle Mirror Transformation | Won | |
| 2014 | Obie Award | Musical Theater | Fun Home | Won | |
| 2024 | Drama League Awards | Outstanding Director of a Play | An Enemy of the People | Nominated | |

== See also ==
- List of English speaking theatre directors in the 20th and 21st centuries
