= Man's World =

Man's World may refer to:

- Man's World (album), by Mountain, 1996
- MW (Indian magazine), an Indian men's lifestyle magazine previously known as Man's World
- Man's World (Passage Press magazine), men's magazine published by Passage Press
- "Man's World" (song), by Marina, 2020
- A Man's World (1918 film), an American silent film directed by Herbert Blaché
- A Man's World (1942 film), an American film directed by Charles Barton

== See also ==
- Mann's World, a 2011 album by Mann
- "It's a Man's Man's Man's World", a 1966 song by James Brown
