= The Common Pursuit =

Play written by Simon Gray

- at the Phoenix Theatre, 1988
- Original language: English
- Written by: Simon Gray
- Genre: Drama
- Setting: Cambridge and London,

Premiere
- Date: 3 July 1984
- Place: The Lyric Theatre, Hammersmith, London
- Official website

The Common Pursuit is a play by Simon Gray which follows the lives of six characters who first meet as undergraduates at Cambridge University when they are involved in setting up a literary magazine called The Common Pursuit. The title is an allusion to F. R. Leavis's 1952 collection of essays Scrutiny: The Common Pursuit.

== Characters ==
- Stuart Thorne
- Marigold Watson
- Martin Musgrove
- Humphry Taylor
- Nick Finchling
- Peter Whetworth

== Synopsis ==
The characters of The Common Pursuit first meet in Stuart Thorne's rooms in Cambridge, at the first meeting of a literary magazine Stuart is starting called The Common Pursuit. He and Marigold are very much in love, Nick is determined to become a theatre critic, Humphry wants to be a philosophy professor, Martin is set on a career in publishing and Peter only seems interested in chasing women. The play then follows their various lives and careers over the next 20 years, and their struggles to remain faithful to their ambitions and the things they love.

== Productions ==
The Common Pursuit was first performed at the Lyric Theatre, Hammersmith on July 3, 1984, directed by Harold Pinter, with the following cast:

- Stuart Thorne - Nicholas le Prevost
- Marigold Watson - Nina Thomas
- Martin Musgrove - Ian Ogilvy
- Humphry Taylor - Clive Francis
- Nick Finchling - Robert East
- Peter Whetworth - Simon Williams

Simon Gray kept a diary of the original production which was published as An Unnatural Pursuit and other pieces by Faber and Faber in 1985. The play was first performed in London's West End on April 7, 1988, with Rik Mayall, John Sessions, Sarah Berger, Paul Mooney, Stephen Fry and John Gordon Sinclair, directed by Simon Gray. In July, the cast changed to James Wilby, Patrick Barlow and Jason Carter with Sarah Berger, Paul Mooney and John Gordon Sinclair.

Between the 1984 and 1988 London productions, Gray directed the American premiere of The Common Pursuit at the Promenade Theatre, Off-Broadway. It opened on October 19, 1986, won positive notices, ran for 352 performances, and won both the 1987 Lucille Lortel Award for Outstanding Play, and the 1987 Outer Critics Circle for Outstanding New Off-Broadway Play. The original cast included:

- Stuart Thorne - Kristoffer Tabori
- Marigold Watson - Judy Geeson
- Martin Musgrove - Michael Countryman
- Humphry Taylor - Peter Friedman
- Nick Finchling - Nathan Lane
- Peter Whetworth - Dylan Baker

== Television ==
Simon Gray adapted The Common Pursuit for the BBC's Screen Two series, which was broadcast on 8 March 1992, with Kevin McNally, Tim Roth, Stella Gonet, Andrew McCarthy, Stephen Fry and James Fleet. It was directed by Christopher Morahan and produced by Kenith Trodd.

== Critical reception ==
In a review for The Daily Telegraph of a production of The Common Pursuit at the Menier Chocolate Factory, London in 2008, Charles Spencer wrote:

This is a play that delivers an unexpected depth charge of emotion. Simon Gray's writing is sharp, funny and clever, and, more than 20 years after the piece's premiere, the dramatist's assumption of intelligence and cultural knowledge on the part of his audience seems breathtakingly daring.
