= Nocturama (play) =

Nocturama is a play by American playwright Annie Baker, who won the 2014 Pulitzer Prize for Drama. It is one of her four plays set in fictional Shirley, Vermont. The play was developed at the Soho Rep Writer/Director Lab and was workshopped at the Cape Cod Theatre Project in 2008.

== Plot ==
The play is set in Shirley, Vermont in 2007. Twenty-six year-old Skaggs comes to stay with his divorced mother, Judy, after suffering a nervous breakdown as a result of a breakup. Judy lives with her boyfriend Gary, who is overweight and addicted to video games, one in particular called Nocturama. During his stay, Skaggs visits the house/museum of a local 19th-century poet, who committed suicide. Tending the museum is Amanda, who is African-American and obsessed with the poet and her house. Skaggs invites Amanda over for dinner one night, which reveals Skagg's brooding nature and the tenuous structure of Judy and Gary's relationship.

== Background ==
Of the play, Baker said, "I wrote it during a period of crippling self-hatred and depression, and I was interested in how, even if you're a well-intentioned depressed person, you can still really screw up the lives of everyone around you just through the things that being depressed can make you say. I was also interested in what we mean when we say 'depressed.' I was also interested in the way liberal-seeming white people talk about black people when they're not around."

The play has not yet been produced. Baker has "turned down a number of productions" because Nocturama "needs to happen at the right time and in the right place." The 2008 Cape Cod Theatre Project (Falmouth, Massachusetts) workshop was directed by Hal Brooks and featured Michael Chernus, Quincy Tyler Bernstine, and Guy Boyd. Nocturama was read on May 10, 2010, at the Manhattan Theatre Club, where it was directed by Sam Gold.
