= Circle Mirror Transformation =

Play by Annie Baker

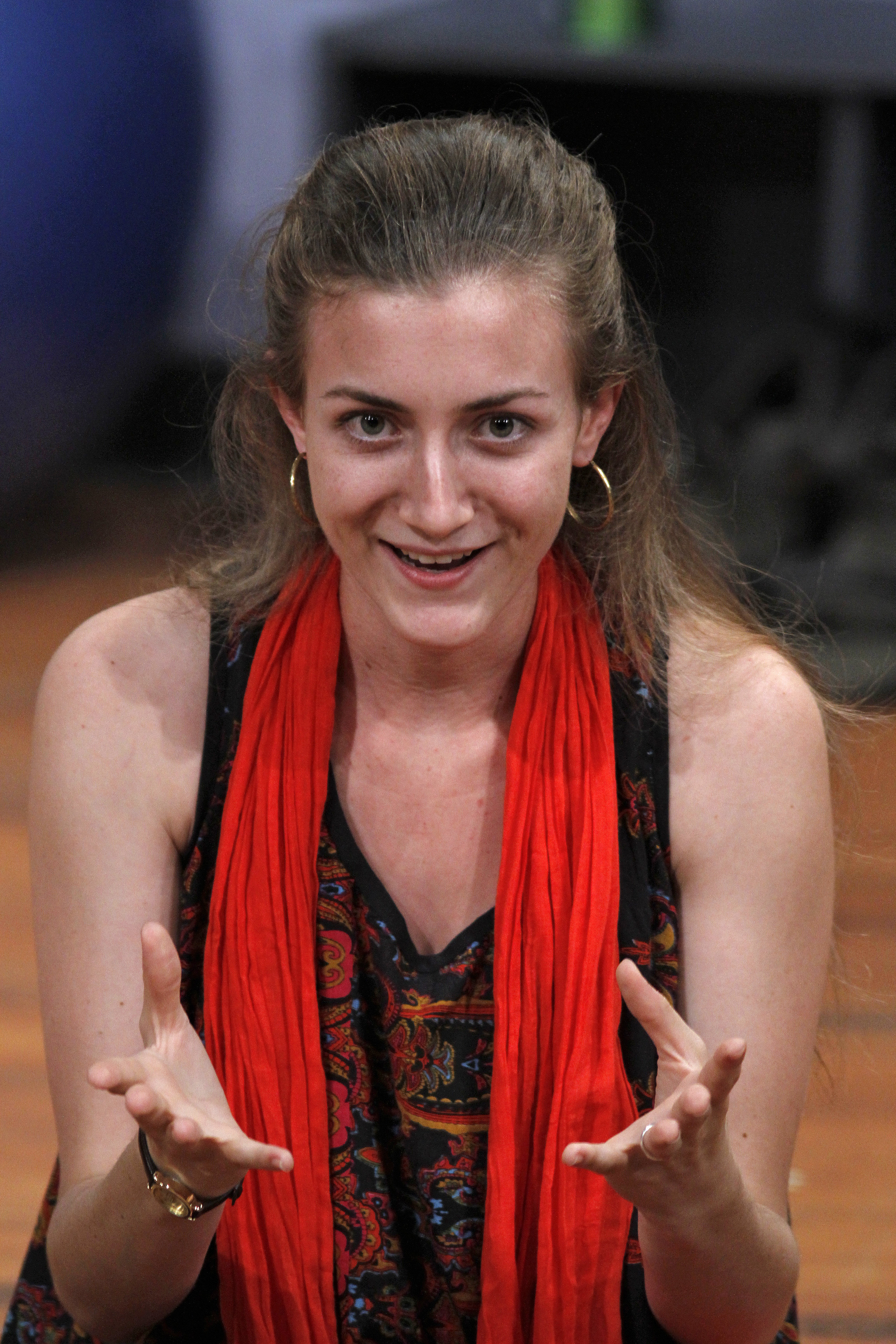
- Photo from the 2012 Otterbein University production
- Written by: Annie Baker
- Original language: English

Premiere
- Date premiered: October 13, 2009
- Place premiered: Playwrights Horizons

Circle Mirror Transformation is a play by Annie Baker, centered on drama classes at a community center in Vermont. The play opened Off-Broadway in 2009 and received the Obie Award for Best New American Play.

== Summary ==
In Shirley, Vermont, Marty, an acting teacher, holds an Adult Creative Drama class at the local community center. The people who sign up for the class are Schultz, a recently divorced carpenter; Lauren, a reserved high school junior; Theresa, a former actor; and Marty's husband James. Marty takes the students through various acting and dramatic exercises; they act like trees, beds and baseball gloves. In one exercise, they act as one another and tell their life stories. As a possible romance begins each of the group slowly reveal themselves. In a final exercise, Lauren imagines herself meeting Schultz in 10 years and they tell each other what has transpired.

== Cast ==
Characters	Off-Broadway debut (2009)	West End debut (2013)
Schultz	Reed Birney	Toby Jones
Marty	Deirdre O'Connell	Imelda Staunton
Lauren	Tracee Chimo	Shannon Tarbet
James	Peter Friedman	Danny Webb
Theresa	Heidi Schreck	Fenella Woolgar

== Production history ==
Circle Mirror Transformation premiered Off-Broadway at Playwrights Horizons on 13 October 2009 and closed on 31 January 2010. Directed by Sam Gold, the cast featured Reed Birney (Schultz), Tracee Chimo (Lauren), Peter Friedman (James), Deirdre O'Connell (Marty) and Heidi Schreck (Theresa).

The play received Obie Awards for Best New American Play (sharing it with Baker's The Aliens) Performance, Ensemble and Directing (Sam Gold).

The play was nominated for the Drama Desk Award, Outstanding Play and Outstanding Director of a Play, and the cast was awarded a special Drama Desk Award, Outstanding Ensemble Performances.

It received its European premiere in a Royal Court Theatre production at the Rose Lipman Building in De Beauvoir Town, London from 5 July to 3 August 2013, directed by James Macdonald and with a cast consisting of Toby Jones (Schultz), Imelda Staunton (Marty), Shannon Tarbet (Lauren), Danny Webb (James) and Fenella Woolgar (Theresa).

In October 2021, Old Hamptonians Amateur Dramatic Society presented the first amateur production in the UK.

== Background ==
Circle Mirror Transformation was developed at the Sundance Institute in 2008, directed by Sam Gold and the New York Theatre Workshop, with additional support from the Sundance Institute Time Warner Storytelling Fellowship.

The play is dedicated to "my wonderful director and five beautiful actors."

Baker said that she "wanted the audience to learn about the characters through formal theater exercises. I knew I wanted there to be excruciating silences. I knew I wanted a doomed class romance that left one character embarrassed and the other heartbroken. I knew I wanted the characters to deliver monologues as each other....Eventually I realized that the fun of the play is the fact that it's confined to this dull, windowless little space."

In an interview in 2011, she explained that, "like many of her works, Circle Mirror grew out of research, contemplation and 'fragments of ideas.' She wanted to watch amateurs learn to act. In a windowless room in a community center."

== Critical response ==
The New York Times reviewer called the play "absorbing, unblinking and sharply funny" and wrote: "The artificiality of the acting games just emphasizes the naturalness of the characters’ real lives and feelings. Group members pose as trees, beds and baseball gloves. They perform emotional scenes using only the words goulash and ak-mak. They pretend to be one another, telling their life stories. They write deep, dark secrets (anonymously) on scraps of paper and listen, sitting in a circle on the floor, as the confessions are read aloud."

The Guardian reviewer of the London production wrote: "...as with 'The Aliens'... I found myself admiring Baker's sensitivity while hungering for a bit more theatrical attack... All this emerges with a good deal of subtlety through the students' enactment of each other's situations. But, while Baker tells us a lot about her characters, we learn little about Vermont... Baker's play does, however, yield some excellent performances... But although the piece is quietly perceptive, I still feel it's an inward-looking play about inward-looking people."
