= Charles Isherwood =

American theater critic (born 1964)

- Born: Charles Splaine Isherwood Jr. October 1964 (age 61); Palo Alto, California, U.S.
- Education: Stanford University
- Occupation: Theater critic
- Spouse: Ercument Kenger

Charles Splaine Isherwood Jr. (born October 1964) is an American theater critic.

== Career ==
A graduate of Stanford University, Isherwood wrote for Backstage West in Los Angeles. In 1993, he joined the staff of Variety, where he was promoted to the position of chief theater critic in 1998.

In 2004, Isherwood was hired by The New York Times. He was fired by the paper in 2017, reportedly following public disputes with colleagues and correspondence with theater producers that "violated ethical rules." In March 2017, Isherwood was hired as a contributor for the website Broadway News.

In 2022, Isherwood was appointed The Wall Street Journal's theater critic, succeeding Terry Teachout, who had died on January 13, 2022.

== Personal life ==
Charles Splaine Isherwood Jr. was one of four children born to Charles Splaine "Charlie" Isherwood and Patricia (McInerney) Isherwood.

He is married to Ercument Kenger.
