= Skift =

Digital media company and travel website

- Industry: Travel; Digital media Business intelligence
- Founded: 2012; 14 years ago
- Founders: Rafat Ali (CEO); Jason Clampet (Editor-in-Chief, Skift.com)
- Headquarters: New York, New York, U.S.
- Products: Skift.com; Research reports Conferences (Skift Global Forum); Branded content (SkiftX)
- Website: skift.com

Skift is a travel industry news site. Skift also provides market research and marketing services to the travel industry.

Skift was founded in 2012 by Rafat Ali and Jason Clampet. The name Skift, which means "shift" or "transformation" in Nordic languages, was chosen by Ali and Clampet to highlight the ongoing changes in the future of travel.

== Background ==
In July 2012, Rafat Ali (founder of paidContent) founded Skift and assumed the role of CEO. Co-founder Jason Clampet, formerly of Frommer's, joined as Skift's head of product. For its launch, Skift raised about $500,000 in funding from investors, including L. Gordon Crovitz, Craig Forman, Jim Friedlich, Tom Glocer, Vishal Gondal, Jason Hirschhorn. In May 2013, Skift announced that it raised an additional $1.1 million in seed financing from a group of investors led by Lerer Ventures.

Skift's revenue comes from three main sources: branded content, subscriptions, and a series of global events - of which the flagship is the Skift Global Forum held annually in New York.

== Research and advertising ==
Skift produces twice-monthly reports, analyst calls, and data sheets on travel trends aimed at professionals in the travel industry, which are available by paid subscription.

The New York Times, CNBC, and The Verge have cited Skift studies in their reporting.

In January 2015, Skift launched a print magazine, Skift Megatrends, built around the company's annual travel trend forecast.

SkiftX is Skift's advertising and branded content studio. As of 2015, 30 percent of Skift's business came from SkiftX, which has created microsites, videos, and custom trend reports for companies within the travel industry.

== Conferences ==
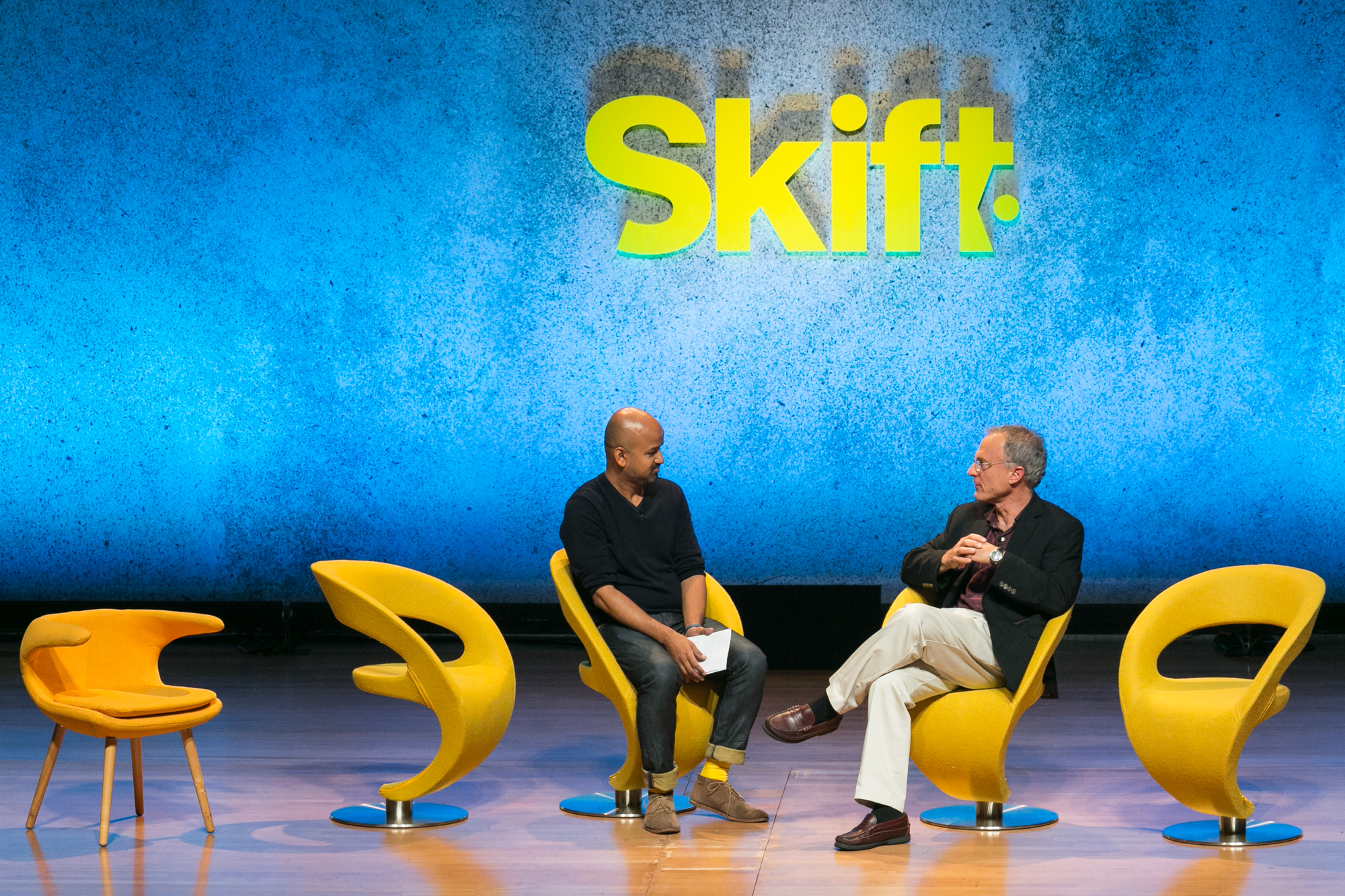
Skift CEO Rafat Ali interviews TripAdvisor CEO Stephen Kaufer at the Skift Global Forum 2016.

Since 2014, Skift has held its annual Skift Global Forum in New York City to discuss the future of travel with the executives of the travel industry.

In 2017, Skift held its first "Skift Forum Europe" event in London and in 2019, it held its first "Skift Forum Asia" in Singapore.
