= Friedlich =

Friedlich is a surname. Notable people with the surname include:

- Jim Friedlich (born 1957), American media executive
- Max Wolf Friedlich, American writer
