= Clare Barron =

American dramatist

- Born: Wenatchee, Washington
- Education: Yale University (BA)
- Occupations: Playwright, actor
- Writing career
- Period: Contemporary

Clare Barron is a playwright and actor from Wenatchee, Washington. She won the 2015 Obie Award for Playwriting for You Got Older. She was a finalist for the 2019 Pulitzer Prize for Drama for Dance Nation.

== Early life and education ==
In an interview, Barron said that she became interested in theatre in her early teens. "I was in a Shakespeare troupe for children in my hometown of Wenatchee, Washington, which was run by the playwright Heidi Schreck’s mother, Sherry Schreck." She attended the Tisch Summer Program while in high school, where she took a writing workshop. Barron graduated from Yale University. After acting for some time, she attended a workshop taught by Annie Baker and wrote a boy put this girl in a cage with a dog and the dog killed the girl. This led to Barron joining a writer's group at the Ensemble Studio Theatre.

== Career ==
=== 2011–2014: Early work as an actress ===
As a performer, Barron has appeared in several plays. Among others, she appeared in Uncle Vanya at the HERE Arts Center (New York City) in 2012 as Marina and The Essential Straight and Narrow at The New Ohio Theatre (New York City) in May 2014. Barron appeared in the play by Heidi Schreck The Consultant at the Long Wharf Theatre, New Haven in January 2014.

=== 2013–2018: Playwriting debut and Dance Nation ===
Barron was a member of Soho Rep's 2013/14 Writer/Director Lab, where she developed her play You Got Older. She received the Page 73 Playwriting Fellowship in 2014, and Page 73 produced You Got Older in October to November 2014 at the HERE Arts Center, New York City. The production was directed by Anne Kauffman and featured Reed Birney and Brooke Bloom. In 2015, You Got Older was nominated for the Drama Desk Award for Outstanding Play. She was featured on the 2015 Kilroys' List. The New Yorker reviewer wrote: "This terrific new play by Clare Barron, directed by Anne Kauffman for Page 73, offers a hilarious and painfully affecting blend of oddball dialogue, beautifully observed family dynamics, and a preoccupation with the weird ways of the body." She received the 2015 Obie Award for Playwriting for You Got Older.

Her play Baby Screams Miracle was produced Off-Off-Broadway by Clubbed Thumb in their Summerworks Festival in May to June 2, 2013. Reviewer Sherri Kronfeld wrote: "...is a satisfyingly peculiar family-nightmare-mystery-storm-freakout-session, almost more dream than play at times." The Woolly Mammoth Theatre Company (Washington, DC) produced the play early in 2017. In 2016 her play I'll Never Love Again was produced at Bushwick Starr in Brooklyn, New York. It was a New York Times Critics' Pick by Ben Brantley, who wrote "...recalls the anguishing mysteries of sex and love during adolescence." The Time Out reviewer wrote: "Barron is a sharp, clear, virtuosic voice in the neorealist movement downtown.... The theme is Barron's awakening sexuality; at one point, she uses her body as an instrument."

Barron's play Dance Nation received its world premiere Off-Broadway at Playwrights Horizons in April 2018. The play was the winner of the 2017 Susan Smith Blackburn Prize, which included a $25,000 award. The play involves pre-teen competitive dancers and their competition at the Boogie Down Grand Prix. It was a finalist for the 2019 Pulitzer Prize for Drama. The committee wrote: "A refreshingly unorthodox play that conveys the joy and abandon of dancing, while addressing the changes to body and mind of its preteen characters as they peer over the precipice toward adulthood." The reviewer for The New York Times Ben Brantley noted the "insanely talented playwright" and named the play a Critics Pick: "... conjures the passionate ambivalence of early adolescence..." The play received the 2019 Drama Desk Award, Ensemble Award. The play received a 2019 Obie Award special citation for Clare Barron (playwright) and Lee Sunday Evans (director).

=== 2020–present: Career expansion ===
In February 2020, it was announced Barron would adapt Anton Chekov's Three Sisters for an Off-Broadway production directed by Sam Gold and starring Oscar Isaac, Greta Gerwig, Chris Messina, Lola Kirke, and Steve Buscemi at the New York Theatre Workshop. The production was indefinitely postponed following the outbreak of the Covid-19 pandemic in March 2020. In 2022, she directed, acted and wrote the play 'Shhhh, which revolves around a series of vignettes involving uncomfortable intimate moments. Maya Phillips of The New York Times noted that Barron "rarely opts for the romantic idea of pleasure, instead examining pleasure tied to physical violence and emotional manipulation, shame, self-esteem and trauma. The whole production aches with an unspoken loneliness." She praised her direction and her performance, noting that it's one that is full of "delicate melancholy".

In 2024, she served as a writer and producer for the FX on Hulu historical drama series Say Nothing starring Lola Petticrew based on the 2018 novel of the same name. For her work on the series, she was nominated for the Writers Guild of America Award for Television: Limited Series. In 2026, her play You Got Older was revived at the Cherry Lane Theater starring Alia Shawkat and Peter Friedman. Helen Shaw of the The New York Times praised it as a "sharp revival" noting that the "gorgeously precise [play] can feel like remission — a 100-minute suspension in an art form otherwise defined by choice and action". Adam Feldman of Time Out praised the production writing, "[It's] as funny and discomfiting as the original. I’ve gotten older, but the play hasn’t aged a day, and the new cast is terrific." The production was nominated for both the Drama Desk Award and Drama League Award for Outstanding Revival of a Play.

In July 2026, she held a workshop reading of her latest play Too Bad For Her at the Huron Station Playhouse in Los Angeles with a cast that included Rich Sommer, Gillian Jacobs, and Anna Camp. It was announced it will make its Off-Broadway debut at the Linda Gross Theater produced by the Atlantic Theater Company with direction by Anne Kauffman and starring Sydney Lemmon, Allison Pill and Ato Blankson-Wood with performances starting in January 2027.

== Personal ==
Clare Barron currently lives in Brooklyn.

== Acting credits ==
Year	Title	Role	Playwright	Venue	Ref.
2011	The Tempest	Miranda	William Shakespeare	HERE Arts Center, Off-Off-Broadway	
2012	Uncle Vanya	Marina	Anton Chekov	HERE Arts Center, Off-Off-Broadway	
2014	The Consultant	Amelia	Heidi Schreck	Long Wharf Theater, New Haven	
2014	The Essential Straight and Narrow	Dot	Sarah Lunnie	New Ohio Theatre, Off-Off-Broadway	
2015	I Made a Mistake	Performer	John Del Gaudio	Connelly Theater, Off-Broadway	
2016	I'll Never Love Again	Clare	Clare Barron	The Bushwick Starr, Off-Off-Broadway	
2022	Shhhh	Shareen	Clare Barron	Atlantic Theater Company, Off-Broadway	

== Credited works ==
=== Plays ===
as a playwright

Year	Title	Notes	Ref.
2012	a boy put this girl in a cage with a dog and the dog killed the girl	Stage reading	
2013	Solar Plexus	Short play; part of "Marathon of One-Act Plays"	
2013	Chicken Butt	Short play; part of "Just Right Just Now"	
2013	Baby Screams Miracle	Debut at The Wild Project, New York City	
2013	Dirty Crusty or Grandad	Stage reading	
2014	You Got Older	Debut at Here Arts Center; 2026 revival	
2016	I'll Never Love Again	Debut at The Bushwick Starr, New York City; Also actor	
2018	Dance Nation	Debut at Playwrights Horizons	
2020	The Three Sisters	Adaptation; Postponed due to Covid-19	
2022	Shhhh	Debut at Atlantic Theater Company; Also actor and director	
2027	Too Bad For Her	Debut at Atlantic Theater Company	

=== Television ===
Year	Title	Role	Notes	Ref.
2024	Say Nothing	Writer	3 episodes; also producer	
2027	The Morning Show	Writer	Episode 5.2	

== Awards and nominations ==
Organizations	Year	Category	Work	Result	Ref.
Blackburn Prizes	2015	The Susan Smith Blackburn Prize	You Got Older	Finalist	
Blackburn Prizes	2017	The Susan Smith Blackburn Prize	Dance Nation	Won	
Dramatists Guild of America	2017	The Horton Foote Award	Dance Nation	Finalist	
Drama League Award	2019	Outstanding Production of a Broadway or Off-Broadway Play	Dance Nation	Nominated	
New York Drama Critics' Circle	2018	Best American Play	Dance Nation	Finalist	
New York Drama Critics' Circle	2018	Best Play	Dance Nation	Finalist	
Obie Awards	2015	Best Playwriting	You Got Older	Won	
Obie Awards	2019	Special Citation	Dance Nation	Honored	
Pulitzer Prize	2019	Drama	Dance Nation	Finalist	
Writers Guild of America Awards	2024	Limited Series	Say Nothing	Nominated	

== Other honors ==
- Pulitzer Prize in Drama Finalist, 2019, Dance Nation
- Whiting Award in Drama, 2017 (which includes a monetary award of $50,000)
- Susan Smith Blackburn Prize, 2017, Dance Nation
- Relentless Award, 2015, Dance Nation
- Obie Award for Playwriting, 2015, You Got Older
- Paula Vogel Playwriting Award, 2014
- Page 73 Playwriting Fellowship, 2014
