= Lebda =

Lebda is a surname. Notable people with the surname include:

- Brett Lebda (born 1982), American ice hockey player
- Doug Lebda (died 2025), American business executive
