= Center for News, Technology & Innovation =

Independent research center in Washington, D.C., focused on media and technology policy

The Center for News, Technology & Innovation (CNTI) is an independent research center, based in Washington, D.C., that examines issues that shape media and technology policy and convenes conversations among global experts in journalism and the internet. It was founded in 2023.

== Staff and board ==
Amy S. Mitchell, former managing director of news and information research at the Pew Research Center, is the center's founder and executive director. Craig Forman, managing general partner at NextNews Ventures and former CEO of the McClatchy Co., is executive chair.

Executive board members are Marty Baron, former editor of The Washington Post, The Boston Globe and the Miami Herald; Dr. Sangu Delle, CEO of CarePoint (formerly Africa Health Holdings); Richard Gingras, vice president of news at Google; Paula Miraglia, co-founder and former CEO of Nexo Jornal; Maria Ressa, co-founder and CEO of Rappler and a Nobel Peace Prize honoree; and Marietje Schaake, international policy director at Stanford University’s Cyber Policy Center and a former member of the European Parliament. More than two dozen industry and civil society leaders from around the world are members of the center’s advisory committee.

== Research ==
“We work on issues at the intersection of journalism and technology to enable a diverse, independent news media to maintain an open internet and foster informed policy discussions,” Mitchell told Editor & Publisher, a news industry publication, in 2025. Among the center's research topics are artificial intelligence in journalism (including deepfakes and algorithmic transparency); information integrity (including disinformation, content moderation and an open internet); journalist safety (including cybersecurity, online abuse and source safety); media sustainability and relevance (including business models, copyright and public policy); and press freedom (in the United States and around the world). As part of its Defining News Initiative, the center has partnered with journalism organizations on five continents on reports that examine the changing role of journalists in an evolving media ecosystem.

In September 2025 CNTI assumed the stewardship of Newsgeist, a "network of news journalists, educators, entrepreneurs, and advocates working together to set a course to the future of news reporting in both digital and analog forms." Founded in 2014 and funded by Google and the John S. and James L. Knight Foundation, it has been described as an annual "un-conference" of invited guests that is deliberately not public-facing so that participants can speak freely.

== Funding ==
CNTI is a nonprofit, tax-exempt 501(c)(3) organization. Initial funders included the John S. and James L. Knight Foundation, Google, the MacArthur Foundation, the Lenfest Institute and Craig Newmark Philanthropies.
