= Sydney Lemmon =

American actress (born 1990)

- Lemmon in 2025
- Born: Sydney Noël Lemmon; August 10, 1990 (age 36); Los Angeles, California, U.S.
- Education: Boston University (BFA); Yale University (MFA)
- Occupation: Actress
- Years active: 2014–present
- Parents: Chris Lemmon (father); Gina Raymond (mother)
- Relatives: Jack Lemmon (grandfather); Cynthia Stone (grandmother)

Sydney Noël Lemmon (born August 10, 1990) is an American actress. Lemmon grew up in an acting family with her grandfather being legendary actor Jack Lemmon. She studied acting at Yale University and the London Academy of Music and Dramatic Art.

Lemmon made her Broadway debut in a supporting role in the Beau Willimon play The Parisian Woman before earning acclaim for her leading role in the Max Wolf Friedlich thriller play Job (2023–2024). On television, she has acted in Fear the Walking Dead (2019–2021), Succession (2019–2023), Helstrom (2020) and Love Story (2026). She has also taken film roles in Firestarter (2022), Tár (2022), and The Drama (2026).

== Early life and education ==
Lemmon is the granddaughter of Academy Award-winning actor Jack Lemmon. She received an MFA from Yale University in 2017, where she was the recipient of the Julie Harris Scholarship. Lemmon received her BFA from Boston University in 2012 and also attended the London Academy of Music and Dramatic Art.

== Career ==
Lemmon with the cast of Succession at the Broadway premiere for The Picture of Dorian Gray (2025)

She made her acting debut in the Beau Willimon play The Parisian Woman (2018). She has earned acclaim for her leading role acting opposite Peter Friedman in the Max Wolf Friedlich thriller play Job (2023–2024). The production premiered off-Broadway in 2023 and on had its Broadway transfer in 2024. In the play, she portrayed a professional who works in content moderation, who is in mandated therapy after her office breakdown, with Friedman as the therapist. Adrian Horton of The Guardian praised Lemmon's writing that her "precise performance holds [the play] together". Frank Rizzo of Variety wrote, "Lemmon is riveting, and brings an intelligent fierceness to her character."

On television, she took an early role in Law & Order: Special Victims Unit before portraying Ana Helstrom in the Hulu superhero series Helstrom. She is also known for her recurring roles in the AMC horror series Fear the Walking Dead (2019–2021) and the HBO series Succession (2019–2023). She has taken supporting roles in films such as Velvet Buzzsaw (2019), Tár (2021), and The Drama (2026). She portrayed Carolyn Bessette-Kennedy's sister, Lauren Bessette in the Primetime Emmy Award-nominated FX on Hulu historical romance Love Story (2026).

She will appear in Amazon MGM thriller Ally Clark and The Philosophy of Dress. It was announced Lemmon would return to the stage in the world premiere of the latest Clare Barron play Too Bad For Her alongside Allison Pill at the Atlantic Theater Company's Off Broadway venue the Linda Gross Theater in 2027.

== Filmography ==
=== Film ===
Year	Title	Role	Notes
2019	Velvet Buzzsaw	Jon Dondon's Assistant	
2021	The Mothership	Johanna	abandoned film
2022	Firestarter	Victoria "Vicky" McGee	
2022	Tár	Whitney Reese	
2026	The Drama	Pauline	
TBA	Ally Clark †		Post-production

=== Television ===
Year	Title	Role	Notes
2014	Irreversible	Waitress	TV movie
2015	Roof Access	Bella	Episode: "Financial District"
2018	Law & Order: Special Victims Unit	Susie	Episode: "Hell's Kitchen"
2019–2021	Fear the Walking Dead	Isabelle	5 episodes
2019, 2023	Succession	Jennifer	2 episodes
2020	Acting for a Cause	Bertha / Charlotte Lucas	2 episodes
2020	Helstrom	Ana Helstrom	Lead role
2022	The Good Fight	Lila Royce	Episode: "The End of the Yips"
2024	Evil	Tori	Episode: "How to Fly an Airplane"
2026	Love Story	Lauren Bessette	Recurring role; 5 episodes

=== Theatre ===
Year	Title	Role	Playwright	Venue	Ref.
2018	The Parisian Woman	Rebecca (understudy)	Beau Willimon	Hudson Theatre, Broadway	
2023	Job	Jane	Max Wolf Friedlich	Soho Playhouse, Off-Broadway	
2024	Job	Jane	Max Wolf Friedlich	Connelly Theater, Off-Broadway	
2024	Job	Jane	Max Wolf Friedlich	Helen Hayes Theatre, Broadway	
2027	Too Bad For Her	Josie	Clare Barron	Linda Gross Theater, Off-Broadway	

== Accolades ==
Organizations	Year	Category	Work	Result	Ref.
Dorian Award	2025	Outstanding Lead Performer in a Broadway Play	Job	Nominated	
Saturn Awards	2019	Best Guest Starring Performance	Fear the Walking Dead	Nominated	
