= Andy Russell (businessman) =

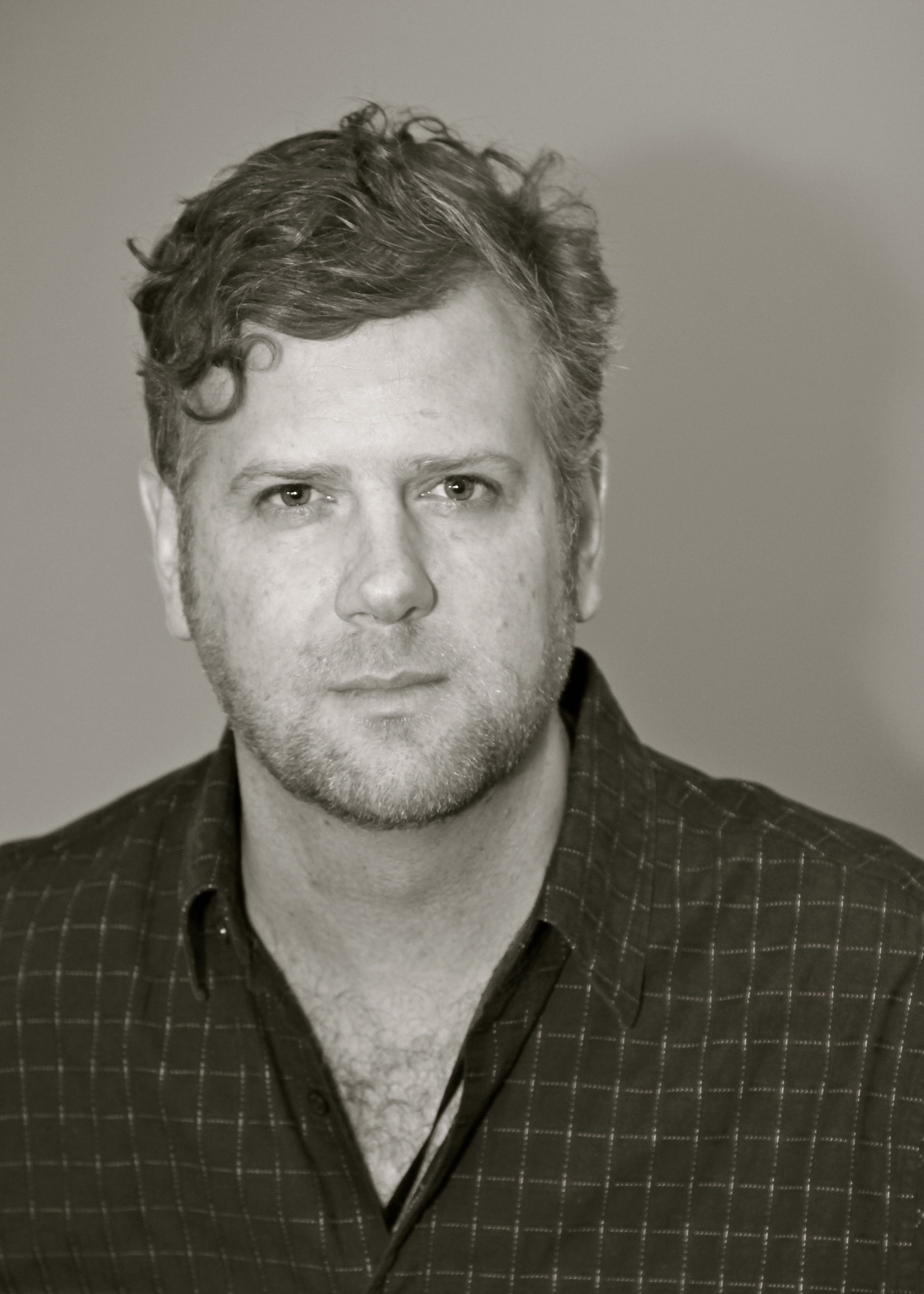
- Born: September 1, 1971 (age 54); New York City, New York, U.S.
- Occupation: Businessman
- Known for: Technology Innovation and Investment

Andy Russell (born 1971) is an American businessman in digital media, advertising technology, and marketing technology. Over the past 17 years, Andy has invested in, incubated, or run over 50 technology companies. He is the founder and CEO of Trigger Media, an operating company focused on launching new digital social, advertising technology, and marketing technology businesses. He is also the founder and former chairman of InsideHook and Host Committee (which later became Fevo). Russell is a founding partner at Bob Pittman's private equity firm Pilot Group. Russell and Empact Collaboration Platform partnered with the Executive Office of the Secretary-General of the United Nations to develop a collaborative platform for the Sustainable Development Goals and the 2030 Agenda for Sustainable Development and Climate Change. Secretary-General Ban Ki-Moon called for the launch of this collaborative platform to the world at the opening session of the General Assembly in September 2016.

== Early career and education ==
Russell created his first business at age 16. A precursor to social networking, the business generated enough profit to allow him to pay for his education at Cornell University where he received his BA in Abnormal Psychology. Upon graduating from Cornell in 1993, Russell joined Chemical Bank (JP Morgan Chase), as an investment banking analyst and later associate in the acquisition finance group under the mentorship of Jimmy Lee.

In 1996, Russell deferred enrollment at Kellogg University where he was to study marketing and opted for the entrepreneurial track. At age 25, Russell co-founded MOOMBA, with investors such as Laurence Fishburne, Larry Gagosian, Oliver Stone, and Keith Barish. Once MOOMBA was operational, Russell enrolled at Columbia Business School. In 1999, Russell earned his Masters in Business Administration (MBA) from Columbia Business School. He simultaneously sold MOOMBA, making money for 28 investors.

From 1999 to 2003, Russell launched the digital media investment practice for East River Ventures.

== Pilot Group ==
In 2003, Russell became a founding partner in Bob Pittman's private equity firm, Pilot Group. The companies that Russell invested in, incubated or bought included Daily Candy (purchased for $2.3M, sold for $125M), Thrillist (incubated and exited for 25x return), Tasting Table (incubated), Idealbite (invested for majority control and exited in one year for 5x return), PureWow (incubated and sold to Gary Vaynerchuk), Zynga (first professional money, exited for 100x return), Betaworks (first professional investor), Business Insider (first investor), Sailthru (first investor, currently valued at $200M), RapLeaf and LiveRamp (first investor, exited for $300M), SpongeCell (first investor), AdRoll (first investor at $6M, currently valued at $500M), and Bounce Exchange (first investor, currently valued at $200M).

== Trigger Media ==
In 2011, Russell founded Trigger Media, an operating company focused on launching transformational or disruptive digital, social, ad tech, and marketing tech businesses. Trigger’s investors and advisors include Bob Pittman, Conde Nast/Advance Publications, former MySpace president Jason Hirschhorn, Paul Tudor Jones of Tudor Investments, former Daily Candy CEO Pete Sheinbaum, as well as Michael Kassan, former president of Initiative Media Worldwide and CEO of MediaLink (recently sold for $270MM), Ken Fox, cofounder of Internet Capital Group, and OneKingsLane founder Ali Pincus,

Trigger Media launched InsideHook, a men's lifestyle website and email newsletter, in 2011 and Host Committee in 2012.
