= Millennial socialism =

Interest in democratic socialism among Americans

Millennial socialism is a resurgence of interest in democratic socialism and social democracy among Americans and Britons typically defined as being born from 1981 to 1996, generationally known as millennials.

== Background ==
According to some studies, American millennials are more supportive of aspects of socialist politics than prior generations. Some American millennials support policies that would widen social safety nets and provide relief for student debt and health care costs. In some late 2010s polls, young Americans viewed socialism positively and had a less favorable view of capitalism than older Americans. According to a 2021 Axios poll, 49% of Americans aged 18 to 34 viewed capitalism positively, compared to 58% in 2019. Capitalism, increasingly dissociated from its connotations of American success during the Cold War, developed an association with corporate greed, exacerbating climate change, and inherited wealth. Some commentators and researchers, such as James Pethokoukis of the American Enterprise Institute and Emily Ekins of the Cato Institute, have argued that millennial support for socialism can be more accurately described as support for social democracy, as opposed to socialism as traditionally conceived (e.g., a planned economy).

As a generation, American millennials grew up with political discussions about class and inequality, the youngest millennials having been teenagers during the 2011 Occupy Wall Street movement. Young Americans generally face worse economic prospects than their forebears, including a higher cost of living, and an increased student debt burden. A 2019 SuperMoney report showed that average millennial income growth is flat after inflation.

== Electoral politics ==
The American democratic socialist politicians Bernie Sanders and Alexandria Ocasio-Cortez have enjoyed support among millennials, with 70% saying they would be supportive of a candidate with a socialist background. A 2019 YouGov poll showed a majority of millennial respondents as likely to vote for a socialist candidate and millennial voters in the 2020 Democratic presidential primary preferred the democratic socialist candidate Sanders over Joe Biden by 20 percentage points. Throughout the late 2010s, millennials revitalized the aging Democratic Socialists of America from a marginalized advocacy group to 100,000 members nationwide. Sanders and millennial socialists invoke the Nordic model as an alternative, in which taxes on markets and a high personal income tax, including of the middle class, fund the government.

Jeremy Corbyn of the United Kingdom Labour Party had a similarly energizing effect on his country's millennials, though while he tripled the political party's size to become the largest in western Europe, its growth was not driven primarily by young people: the average age remained similar to that before the expansion.

== Analysis ==
A 2019 Pew Research poll found that millennials were more distrustful of others than prior generations, suggesting that millennial socialist interest in state intervention might stem less from belief in human goodness and social trust, and more from a lack of such trust.

Economist Ed Glaeser credits "boomer socialism" for the rise of millennial socialism. Although baby boomers (born 1946 to 1964) have an unfavorable view of socialism, baby boomers had social democratic programs such as Social Security, Medicare, and subsidized mortgages.

== See also ==
- Socialism of the 21st century
- Youth politics
- Youth activism
