= Turkey Home =

Turkey Home is a promotional campaign launched by the Turkish Ministry of Culture and Tourism in April 2014, to raise awareness of Turkey as a tourist destination.

== History ==
In early 2014, Irfan Önal, Director General of Promotion for the Turkish Ministry of Culture and Tourism, introduced a new promotional branding strategy called Turkey Home. Within 16 months, Turkey Home became the second most-followed tourism brand worldwide across social and digital media. By January 2016, it had attracted almost 6 million followers.

Skift ranked Turkey Home as the third most commonly searched international tourism brands in 2015, and awarded Turkey Home the "Best Branded Facebook Page" at the Skifties 2015 Social Media Awards for Travel Brands in September 2015.

== See also ==
- Tourism in Turkey
