= Amy Mitchell =

Amy Mitchell may refer to:

- Amy S. Mitchell (born 1969), executive director of the Center for News, Technology & Innovation
- Amy Mitchell (EastEnders), a character in the British soap opera EastEnders

== See also ==
- Amy B. Mitchell House, a historic house in Winchester, Massachusetts
