= Thrive (website) =

American financial advice software company

- Type: Public (owned by Tree.com)
- Industry: Financial advice, Personal finance, Software
- Founded: 2006
- Headquarters: New York, New York
- Key people: Avinash Karnani; (Co-founder); Ori Schnaps; (Co-founder); Doug Lebda; (CEO)
- Products: Web application
- Website: http://www.justthrive.com/

Thrive or Justthrive.com, was a free, web-based personal financial management application offering personalized financial advice and specifically targeting people in their 20s and 30s. The service offered online money management and planning, as well as using algorithmic advice to offer personalized guidance, based on transactions pulled from a user's loan, bank, and credit card accounts. It was acquired by LendingTree in 2009, and its original branded website was permanently shut down on June 3, 2011.

== History ==
Founded by Avinash Karnani and Ori Schnaps in 2006 as a startup company, Thrive was conceived when the founders noticed that their twenty and thirty-something peers had little access to credible financial planning. After entering private beta in early 2008, it was formally launched at Finovate 08 in October 2008 and reached the "$100 million under management" benchmark in less than two weeks. Thrive was acquired in full by LendingTree in February 2009. Despite the acquisition, however, development remains based in New York City and continues to be staffed by the original team.

== Features ==
- Financial Health Score to help users monitor their credit score and savings to debt ratio.
- Actionable, step-by-step advice to help users improve their finances.
- Entire site, including advice, presented with minimal technical terminology: in "plain English".
- Dedicated customer support, including a toll-free phone number (1.888.831.4080) and non-form email response (support@justthrive.com).
- Enhanced budgeting, termed "behavioral budgeting", that is based on the concept of "actions". The budget tells users what they can do each week and month, based on their individual spending habits and goals.
- Brings together checking, savings, credit card, CD, investment, retirement, loans, and other financial accounts into a single, automatically updating interface.
- New features are released on a roughly monthly basis.

== Advocacy and expertise ==
Thrive experts are frequently cited in the media giving commentary on financial issues, including splurge spending, the psychology behind "Free", and the interaction between the economy and technology. Key experts include Co-founder Avinash Karnani on economics and Generation X/Generation Y, Co-founder Ori Schnaps on technology and personal finance, Lead Scientist Matt Wallaert on social psychology, behavioral finance and decision making, and Outreach Coordinator Elisa Cundiff on financial literacy and outreach.

Thrive has publicly spoken out against the policies of financial institutions that provide a higher standard of service to the wealthy, citing data from a company survey of 730 people that shows that the rich have access to lower fees, better interest rates, lower closing costs, and more services, including financial guidance, enhanced customer support, and concierge services. On April 30, 2009, Thrive was on Capitol Hill advocating for increased federal support for financial education as part of the Jump$tart Financial Literacy Day.

== Relationship to LendingTree ==
Thrive was acquired by LendingTree in February 2009 but much of the original development team remained in place until May 2010, when the last of the original team members departed from LendingTree. In July 2009, in sync with LendingTree's rebranding effort, Thrive created a white-labeled version of the site called MoneyRight. The sites are functionally identical, with MoneyRight being a version of Thrive skinned as LendingTree's budgeting site.

== See also ==
- Personal financial management
- Financial literacy
- Personal finance
