= Dance Nation (play) =

2018 play by Clare Barron

- Original language: English
- Written by: Clare Barron
- Genre: Coming-of-age, feminism, friendship, dark comedy

Premiere
- Date: April 13, 2018
- Place: Playwrights Horizons, New York City
- Directed by: Lee Sunday Evans

Dance Nation is an 2018 play by Clare Barron. It is considered a coming-of-age dark comedy, revolving around pre-teen dancers competing at a dance competition. The play debuted off-Broadway at the Peter Jay Sharp Theater produced by the Playwrights Horizons.

== Premise ==
The play follows a group of pre-teen dancers competing for the top prize at the Boogie Down Grand Prix in Tampa Bay—what follows is a celebration of female ambition, ferocity, and unabashed preteen girlhood.

== Cast ==
Role	Playwrights Horizons World Debut (2018)	Almeida Theater West End Debut (2019)
Connie	Purva Bedi	Manjinder Virk
Zuzu	Eboni Booth	Ria Zmitrowicz
Sofia	Camila Canó-Flaviá	Sarah Hadland
Maeve	Ellen Maddow	Nancy Crane
Vanessa	Christina Rouner	Miranda Foster
Dance Teacher Pat	Thomas Jay Ryan	Brendan Cowell
Amina	Dina Shihabi	Karla Crome
Ashley	Lucy Taylor	Kayla Meikle
Luke	Ikechukwu Ufomadu	Irfan Shamji

== Production ==
The play had its worldwide debut off Broadway at the Peter Jay Sharp Theater produced by the Playwrights Horizons where it ran from Apr 13 to Jul 1, 2018. It had its West End theatre debut at the Almeida Theatre where it ran from August 27 to October 6, 2018.

== Reception ==
The play received positive reviews from critics with Ben Brantley of The New York Times giving it a "Critic's Pick". He described it's playwright Barron as being "insanely talented" and declared, "[the play] conjures the passionate ambivalence of early adolescence with such being-there sharpness and poignancy that you’re not sure whether to cringe, cry or roar with happiness". Adam Feldman of Time Out wrote that the play is an "riotous, rattling, sensational new play." When it debuted on the West End, Michael Billington of The Guardian praised the performances, actors, and choreography and noted "Barron’s real skill lies in writing a play that wittily shows how dance can be a source of liberation without ever quelling the tremulous terrors of adolescence."

== Awards and nominations ==
=== 2018 Original production ===
Year	Award	Category	Nominee	Result	Ref.
2018	Dramatists Guild of America	The Horton Foote Award	Clare Barron	Finalist	
2018	New York Drama Critics' Circle	Best American Play	Clare Barron	Finalist	
2018	New York Drama Critics' Circle	Best Play	Clare Barron	Finalist	
2018	Blackburn Prizes	The Susan Smith Blackburn Prize	Clare Barron	Finalist	
2019	Drama League Award	Outstanding Broadway or Off-Broadway Play	Clare Barron	Nominated	
2019	Drama League Award	Distinguished Performance	Eboni Booth	Nominated	
2019	Lucille Lortel Awards	Outstanding Director	Lee Sunday Evans	Won	
2019	Lucille Lortel Awards	Outstanding Choreographer	Lee Sunday Evans	Nominated	
2019	Obie Awards	Special Citation	Clare Barron	Honored	
2019	Pulitzer Prize	Drama	Clare Barron	Finalist	
