= Minky Worden =

American Human Rights advocate and author

- Education: Vanderbilt University
- Occupations: Human rights advocate, writer
- Spouse: L. Gordon Crovitz
- Writing career
- Subject: Human rights

Minky Worden is an American human rights advocate and author. She is a founder of the sport and human rights movement and serves as Director of Global Initiatives at Human Rights Watch. She has been an adjunct associate professor at Columbia University's School of International and Public Affairs since 2013.

== Early life and education ==
A native of Knoxville, Tennessee, Worden is a graduate of Vanderbilt University, where she majored in political science, German, and history. She speaks Cantonese and German.

== Career ==
Worden joined Human Rights Watch in 1998. As Director of Global Initiatives, she develops and implements international media, outreach, and advocacy campaigns. She previously served as Human Rights Watch's Media Director, working with the world's journalists to help them cover crises, wars, human rights abuses, and political developments in some 90 countries worldwide. Worden speaks and writes on the topics of human rights and sports, transnational repression, women's rights, China, and business and human rights.

She previously lived and worked in Hong Kong as an adviser to Democratic Party of Hong Kong chairman Martin Lee and worked at the U.S. Department of Justice in Washington, D.C., as a speechwriter for U.S. Attorney General Dick Thornburgh and in the Executive Office for U.S. Attorneys.

Worden is editor of China's Great Leap: The Beijing Games and Olympian Human Rights Challenges (Seven Stories Press, 2008) and The Unfinished Revolution: Voices from the Global Fight for Women's Rights (Seven Stories Press, 2012). She was co-editor with Kenneth Roth and Amy Bernstein of Torture: Does It Make Us Safer? Is It Ever OK?: A Human Rights Perspective (The New Press, 2005).

Worden is a regular contributor to The New York Times, The Washington Post, Newsweek, and other major global outlets. She is also a Forbes Contributor on Leadership Strategies.

As an adjunct associate professor at Columbia University's School of International and Public Affairs since 2013, she teaches a graduate seminar on human rights advocacy, communications, and international affairs.

Worden has been a keynote speaker at the United Nations, the Oxford Union, and business and human rights conferences. She has testified before the U.S. Congress, European Parliament, and Council of Europe on the topic of human rights.

== Books ==
- The Unfinished Revolution: Voices from the Global Fight for Women's Rights (Seven Stories Press, 2012)

Foreword by Christiane Amanpour. This book outlines the global challenge to secure basic rights for women and girls. Writers from around the world tackle some of the toughest questions about improving the lives of women and explain why we need fresh approaches for the most vexing and durable abuses.

- China's Great Leap: The Beijing Games and Olympian Human Rights Challenges (Seven Stories Press, 2008)

Foreword by Nicholas Kristof. China's Great Leap examines three decades of reform in the People's Republic of China in the context of the 2008 Olympic Games. With contributions from Nobel Peace Prize Laureate Liu Xiaobo and other reformists, the book spotlights key areas for human rights reform that could represent a possible great leap forward for the people of China.

- Torture (The New Press, 2005)

The question of cruel and unusual treatment has taken on new urgency in the United States and around the world. Torture features twelve essays by leading thinkers and experts ranging over history and continents, offering a nuanced, up-to-the-minute exploration of this wrenching topic.

== Writings ==
Worden has written for dozens of news outlets, including:

- "The World is Worried About the World Cup." Forbes. June 9, 2026.
- "The World Cup Needs An Ice Truce." The Seattle Times. March 31, 2026.
- "How U.S. Policies May Exclude Fans From the World From the World Cup." Forbes. July 11, 2025.
- "Red Card For Saudi's World Cup." Forbes. December 9, 2024.
- "The World Cup is Exciting, Lucrative, and Deadly". Human Rights Watch. August 23, 2022.
- "Human Rights Abuses Will Taint the Olympics and the World Cup. It's time to end 'sportswashing' now." The Washington Post. January 3, 2022.
- "As 2022 Olympics host, China escalated human rights abuses. Will IOC look the other way?" Los Angeles Times. February 11, 2021
- "Will FIFA Force Russia to Make the World Cup Friendly to L.G.B.T. People?" The New York Times. May 28, 2018
- "Saudi Sports Reforms Give Girls in the Kingdom a Running Start." The New York Times. September 7, 2017.
- "Beach Volleyball and Women's Rights in Iran?" CNN. February 4, 2016.
- "Human Rights and the 2022 Olympics." The New York Times. January 19, 2015.
- "Raising the Bar: Mega-Sporting Events and Human Rights." Human Rights Watch World Report 2015.
- "Russia's Anti-Gay Laws Threaten the Olympics' Character." The Washington Post. November 22, 2013.
- "The Olympics' Leadership Mess." The New York Times. August 8, 2013.
- "In Saudi Arabia, Women Are Confined by Technology." The Washington Post. December 24, 2012.
- "Saudi Arabia's unacceptable failure to field female athletes for the Olympics." The Guardian. July 10, 2012.
- "Chinese Media Breaks Silence on Blind Activist Chen Guengcheng." The Daily Beast. May 3, 2012.
- "The View From the Empire State Building." MSNBC. October 20, 2003.
- "Hong Kong's Brave Struggle for Democracy." The Asian Wall Street Journal. July 2, 1998.

== Boards of directors ==
- The Centre for Sport and Human Rights, Advisory Council (from 2018); chair of Board Nominations Committee
- Sport & Rights Alliance, (founder, Board member from 2015)
- The Human Trafficking Legal Center (2012-present)
- Chinese Human Rights Defenders (2018-present)
- The Center for Human Rights in Iran, Board chair (from 2008)
- The People’s Portfolio, Board chair (from 2013-2024)
- Equality League (2016 to present)
- Make Music Matter/Healing in Harmony (2020 to present)
- Children’s International Summer Villages (CISV, New York Chapter from 2015)
- Seven Stories Press, Advisory Board member (2008-present)
- The Overseas Press Club, elected Board member (from 1999 to present)
- OPC Foundation Board (2002-present)

== Memberships and affiliations ==
- Council on Foreign Relations, Member (since 1999)
- Council on Foreign Relations, Term Member Advisory Committee (1999–2004)

== Personal life ==
Worden is married to L. Gordon Crovitz, a media executive and advisor to media and technology companies who is a former publisher of The Wall Street Journal. They have three sons.
