= Job (play) =

2023 play by Max Wolf Friedlich

- Original language: English
- Written by: Max Wolf Friedlich
- Subject: mental illness, social media, content moderation
- Genre: Drama
- Setting: Pre-Covid 2020, Bay Area

Premiere
- Date: 6 September 2023
- Place: SoHo Playhouse; New York City
- Directed by: Michael Herwitz

Job is a play written by Max Wolf Friedlich. The original production started on September 6, 2023, at the Soho Playhouse in New York City. The play revolves around a young woman Jane (Sydney Lemmon) with her therapist Loyd (Peter Friedman). It was announced that the play would transfer to Broadway at the Helen Hayes Theatre from July 15 through October 27. On June 27, it was announced that Devonte Hynes would compose original music for the Broadway transfer.

== Plot ==
A young woman, Jane, points a gun at Loyd, her therapist, and then puts the gun down in a panic. Afterwards, their discussion becomes a therapy session, where the two explore their conflicts, themselves, and the forces that bind them together. It is revealed throughout the play that Jane has recently taken a forced leave of absence from her job as a content moderator following a public mental breakdown. The breakdown was caused by a recent encounter that Jane had with her friend Sid from college, who had previously gotten her pregnant. Jane also previously lived in Wisconsin before moving to the Bay Area, where she now resides. Additionally, many details are revealed about Loyd, including that he had graduated from UC Berkeley, he was previously married, and he had two children (a boy and a girl, the latter of whom committed suicide at 13). Towards the end of the play, the audience realizes that Jane believes Loyd is one of the men that Jane was moderating as a content moderator due to the details of his life that he had provided. According to Jane, Loyd had forced his two children to have sex (which he filmed and posted online), and, after his daughter committed suicide, he filmed sexual acts that he forced his son to do. After confronting Loyd about his actions, Jane pulls a gun on Loyd. While Loyd is panicking, the lights snap to black as a click sound is heard.

== Cast and characters ==
Character	Off-Broadway	Broadway
Character	2023	2024
Jane	Sydney Lemmon	Sydney Lemmon
Loyd	Peter Friedman	Peter Friedman

- Jane - a woman who's forced to see a therapist due to a public breakdown.
- Loyd - the therapist

== Production history ==
=== Off-Broadway (2023) ===
The play was developed by producer–dramaturg Hannah Getts and written by Max Wolf Friedlich. Originally written as part of IAMA Theatre Company's emerging writer's group, Job was the winner of the inaugural SoHo Playhouse Lighthouse Series. That production starred Alex O’Shea and Tim Barker.

The play was directed by Michael Herwitz and starred Peter Friedman and Sydney Lemmon. Performances began on September 6, 2023, with an opening night on September 18, 2023. The play quickly sold out and extended its performances to mid-October 2023.

A return engagement took place at the Connelly Theater; performances began January 19, 2024, and ran through March 23rd, 2024. It was announced that the play would transfer to the smallest house on Broadway, the 600-seat Helen Hayes Theatre from July 15 through September 29.

=== Broadway (2024) ===
The production transferred to Broadway at the Helen Hayes Theater with the same cast as the Off-Broadway run. Previews began on July 15, 2024 with the play opening on July 30. On August 14, 2024, it was announced that the production will extend through October 27, 2024.

=== Regional Premieres ===
Job's Midwest premier was at Writer's Theater in Glencoe, IL. It was directed by David Esbjornson.

Job had its DC area premiere at Signature Theatre in Arlington Virginia. Eric Hissom starred as Lloyd and Jordan Slattery starred as Jane.

Job premiered in the Southeastern region at Urbanite Theatre in Sarasota, Florida, starring David Breitbarth and Casey Wortmann.

== Reception ==
=== Critical reviews ===
The production has received positive reviews from critics. It was labeled as a "Critic’s Pick" in The New York Times, with Juan A. Ramirez describing it as "a tight, 80-minute play [that] is filled with so many ideas that it seems to expand beyond the walls of the tiny SoHo Playhouse ... Friedlich’s clever updating of the generational-divide format is not undermined by the play’s thematic vastness." Sara Holdren of Vulture wrote, "Job is a horror piece — a Black Mirror episode with the sci-fi dialed down (because the horrors are real) and the punchy, cynical, HBO-ready dialogue dialed up. It's a slick, cleverly crafted drop-tower ride, and while you’re trapped inside, it succeeds at turning your stomach."

Holdren wrote of the performances, "Friedman is especially delightful to watch because he just seems so damn effortless." David Finkle of The New York Stage Review praised the performances, in particular Lemmons' acting: "[She] has far fewer credits than Friedman, but as a result of her performance here looks able to add numerous others pronto. Through the Job course, she’s asked to run the gamut of emotions from A to way beyond Z and often in long outbursts."

=== Accolades ===
Year	Award	Category	Nominee	Result	Ref.
2024	Outer Critics Circle Awards	John Gassner Award for Best New Play	Max Wolf Friedlich	Nominated	
2025	Dorian Award	Outstanding Lead Performer in a Broadway Play	Sydney Lemmon	Nominated	
