= You Got Older =

Play

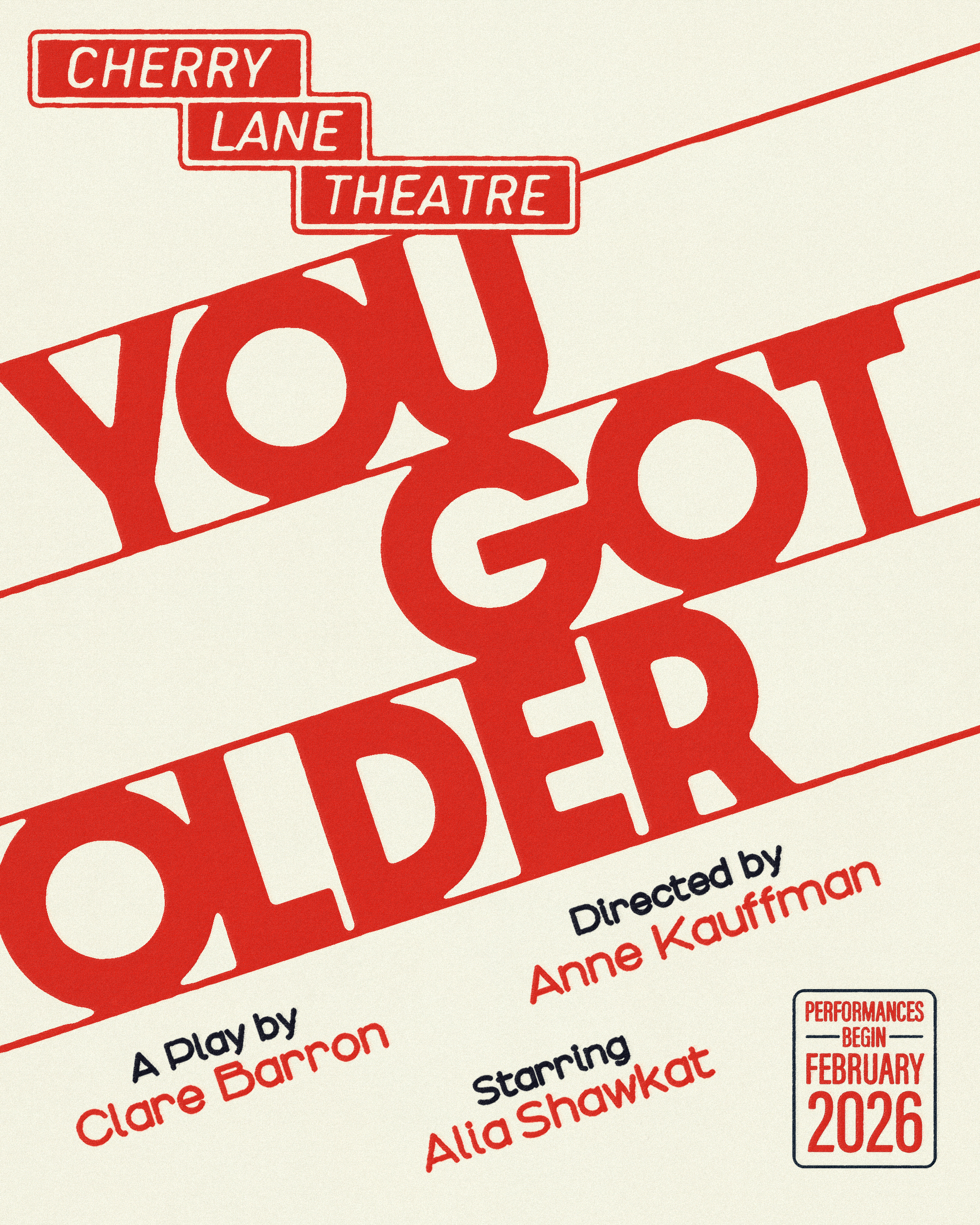
- 2026 Off-Broadway revival poster
- Original language: English
- Written by: Clare Barron
- Genre: Coming-of-age, semi-autobiographical, Memory play, dark comedy

Premiere
- Date: October 29, 2014
- Place: Here Arts Center, New York City

You Got Older is a play by Clare Barron. It is considered a memory play as well as a darkly comedic semi-autobiographical coming-of-age story. The show, first produced Off-Broadway in 2014, follows a 30-year-old daughter taking care of her ailing father. The play addresses themes of intimacy, family, and mortality. The play was first produced at the Here Arts Center where it received the Obie Award for Playwrighting in 2014. The play was revived off-Broadway at the Cherry Lane Theater in 2026 starring Alia Shawkat and Peter Friedman.

== Conception ==
Barron has said that play is loosely based on her life, and the complexities of finding out that her father had been diagnosed with Stage IV Cancer while also having been dumped by her long-term boyfriend. She said that the play focuses on "the question of intimacy. How you can be so close to someone but also feels like there is a part of you that would be mortified for you to know about".

== Summary ==
Following a breakup and job loss, a young woman in her thirties, Mae struggles to balance her romantic life with taking care of her ailing father who has an aggressive form of throat cancer. Throughout the play she is marked by absurd, often sexualized, dream sequences and a "cowboy" character who represents a figure who controls her in a world where she feels helpless.

== Cast ==
Role	Here Arts Center Off-Broadway (2014)	Cherry Lane Theater Off-Broadway (2026)
Mae	Brooke Bloom	Alia Shawkat
Dad	Reed Birney	Peter Friedman
Mac	William Jackson Harper	Caleb Eberhardt
Matthew	Ted Schneider	Misha Brooks
Cowboy	Michael C. Schantz	Paul Cooper
Hannah	Miriam Silverman	Nadine Malouf
Jenny	Keilly McQuail	Nina White

== Productions ==
The play opened Off-Broadway at the Here Arts Center produced by Page 73 in 2014. The production starred Brooke Bloom, Reed Birney, William Jackson Harper, and Miriam Silverman and was directed by Anne Kauffman.

The play had a revival Off-Broadway at the Cherry Lane Theater with performances starting in February 2026. The production starred Alia Shawkat and Peter Friedman with direction by Anne Kauffman.

== Critical reception ==
The original 2014 production received positive reviews with Adam Feldman of TimeOut describing the play as "devastating" and that it "moved [him] as few new plays have." adding "As a critic, I can usually shake things off fast—it’s a coping mechanism—but for some time after the play’s wrenching finale, I found myself literally shaking." Charles Isherwood of The New York Times praised the play for its performances including Reed Birney's as the ailing father with cancer writing, "Birney gives a typically sterling performance of submerged warmth and simplicity". Isherwood criticized Barron's "pronounced fondness for the kinks and quirks of her characters [which] can become wearying" but added "Ms. Kauffman’s direction, the actors find a natural pulse for even the overlong sequences, and help knit together the play’s disparate parts".

The revival in 2026 received widespread acclaim with critic Helen Shaw of The New York Times labeling it as "critics pick" adding that it was a "sharp revival". Shaw wrote that the revival, "can feel like remission — a 100-minute suspension in an art form otherwise defined by choice and action". Robert Hofler of TheWrap gave the production a rave review particularly praising its leads writing, "Playing daughter and father, Alia Shawkat and Peter Friedman are the kinds of actors who never let us catch them acting. They simply embody their roles. They reveal everything with the tiniest of gestures." Adam Feldman of TimeOut wrote, "The original Off Broadway production of Barron’s extraordinary play was one of my favorite shows of 2014, and this revival at A24’s Cherry Lane Theatre—impeccably directed, once again, by Kauffman—is as funny and discomfiting as the original. I’ve gotten older, but the play hasn’t aged a day, and the new cast is terrific."

== Awards and nominations ==
=== 2014 Original production ===
Year	Award	Category	Nominee	Result	Ref.
2015	Drama Desk Awards	Outstanding Play	Clare Barron	Nominated	
2015	Drama Desk Awards	Outstanding Actress in a Play	Brooke Bloom	Nominated	
2015	Obie Awards	Best Playwriting	Clare Barron	Won	
2015	Obie Awards	Best Performance	Brooke Bloom	Won	

=== 2026 Off-Broadway production ===
Year	Award	Category	Nominee	Result	Ref.
2026	Drama Desk Awards	Outstanding Revival of a Play		Nominated	
2026	Drama League Awards	Outstanding Revival of a Play		Nominated	
