= Alia Shawkat =

American actress (born 1989)

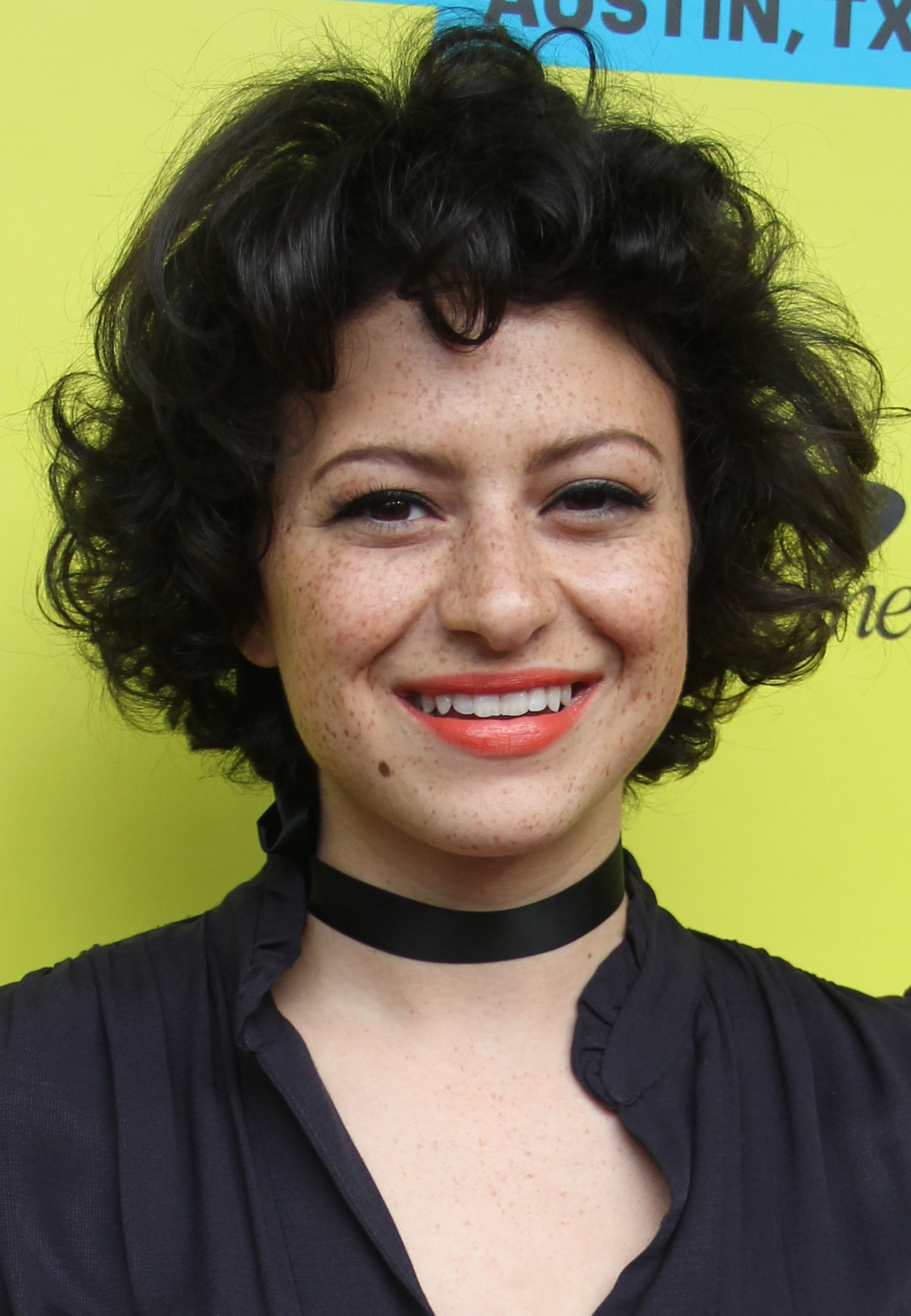
- Shawkat in 2016
- Born: Alia Martine Shawkat; April 18, 1989 (age 37); Riverside, California, U.S.
- Occupations: Actress; singer; painter
- Years active: 1999–present
- Partner: Phil Burgers
- Children: 1
- Relatives: Paul Burke (maternal grandfather)

Alia Martine Shawkat (Note: Pronunciation: /ˈæliə ˈʃɔːkæt/, AL-ee-ə SHAW-kat) (born April 18, 1989) is an American actress. She is known for her performances as Maeby Fünke in the Fox/Netflix television sitcom Arrested Development (2003–2006; 2013–2019), Dory Sief in the TBS and HBO Max dark comedy series Search Party (2016–2022), and Gertie Michaels in the 2015 horror-comedy film The Final Girls, as well as her roles in State of Grace (2001–2002) and The Old Man starring Jeff Bridges (2022–2024). She has also guest starred as historical figures Frances Cleveland, Virginia Hall, and Alexander Hamilton on Comedy Central's Drunk History (2014–2016).

== Early life ==
Shawkat was born in Riverside, California, to Dina Shawkat (née Burke) and strip club owner Tony Shawkat. She grew up in Palm Springs and has two brothers. Her father is from Baghdad, Iraq, and her mother is American. Her maternal grandfather was actor Paul Burke.

== Career ==
=== 2000–2009: Breakout and Arrested Development ===
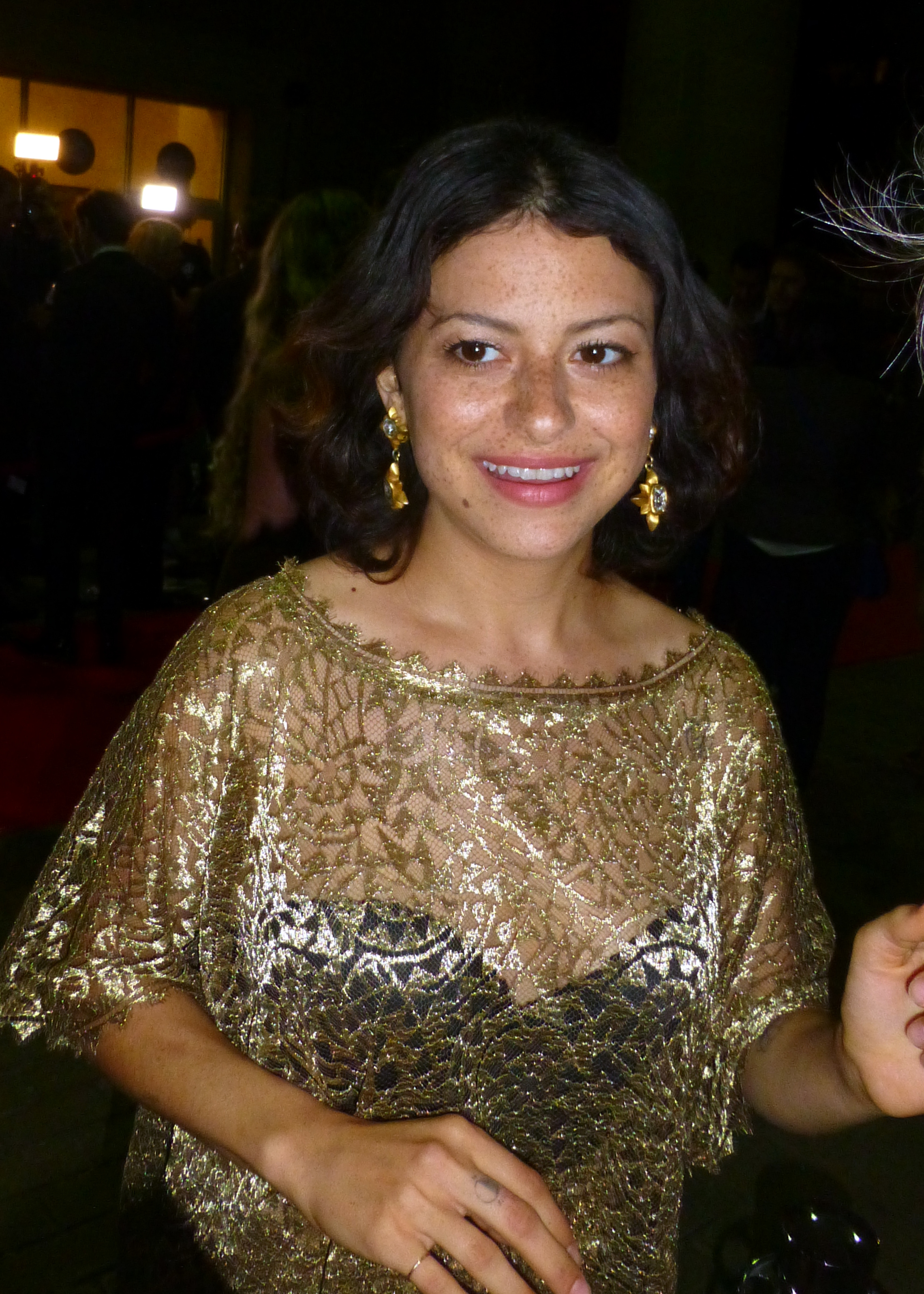
Shawkat at the 2015 Toronto International Film Festival premiere of Green Room

From 2001 to 2002, Shawkat played Hannah in State of Grace. As Maeby Fünke, Shawkat was a regular cast member of Arrested Development for the entire run of the show from 2003 to 2019. The series received nearly universally positive reviews, with Shawkat's performance occasionally singled out for praise. Pop-culture commentator Brian M. Palmer remarked that she was "one of the brightest lights on a show populated solely by bright lights", and Scott Weinberg of eFilmCritic described her as "one funny young lady". In an interview with The A.V. Club in 2010, Shawkat remarked that many of her "formative moments" as an actress took place on the Arrested Development set: "[Show creator] Mitch Hurwitz was like a father figure to me. In a way, it was great to be around [the cast], because I feel that my understanding of comedy was able to grow really well during that time."

In 2009, Shawkat appeared in Whip It co-star Har Mar Superstar's music video for "Tall Boy", which also featured Eva Mendes and Eric Wareheim. In October 2009, it was announced that Shawkat, Har Mar, and Whip It co-star Elliot Page would produce and write a show for HBO called Stitch N' Bitch. According to The Hollywood Reporter, the show "follows two painfully cool hipsters as they relocate from Brooklyn's Williamsburg neighborhood to Los Angeles' Silver Lake enclave in hopes of becoming artists—of any kind".

=== 2010–2015: Continued roles ===
Shawkat, along with State of Grace and Arrested Development co-star and close friend Mae Whitman, sang guest vocals on several tracks from indie-punk band Fake Problems' 2010 album Real Ghosts Caught on Tape.

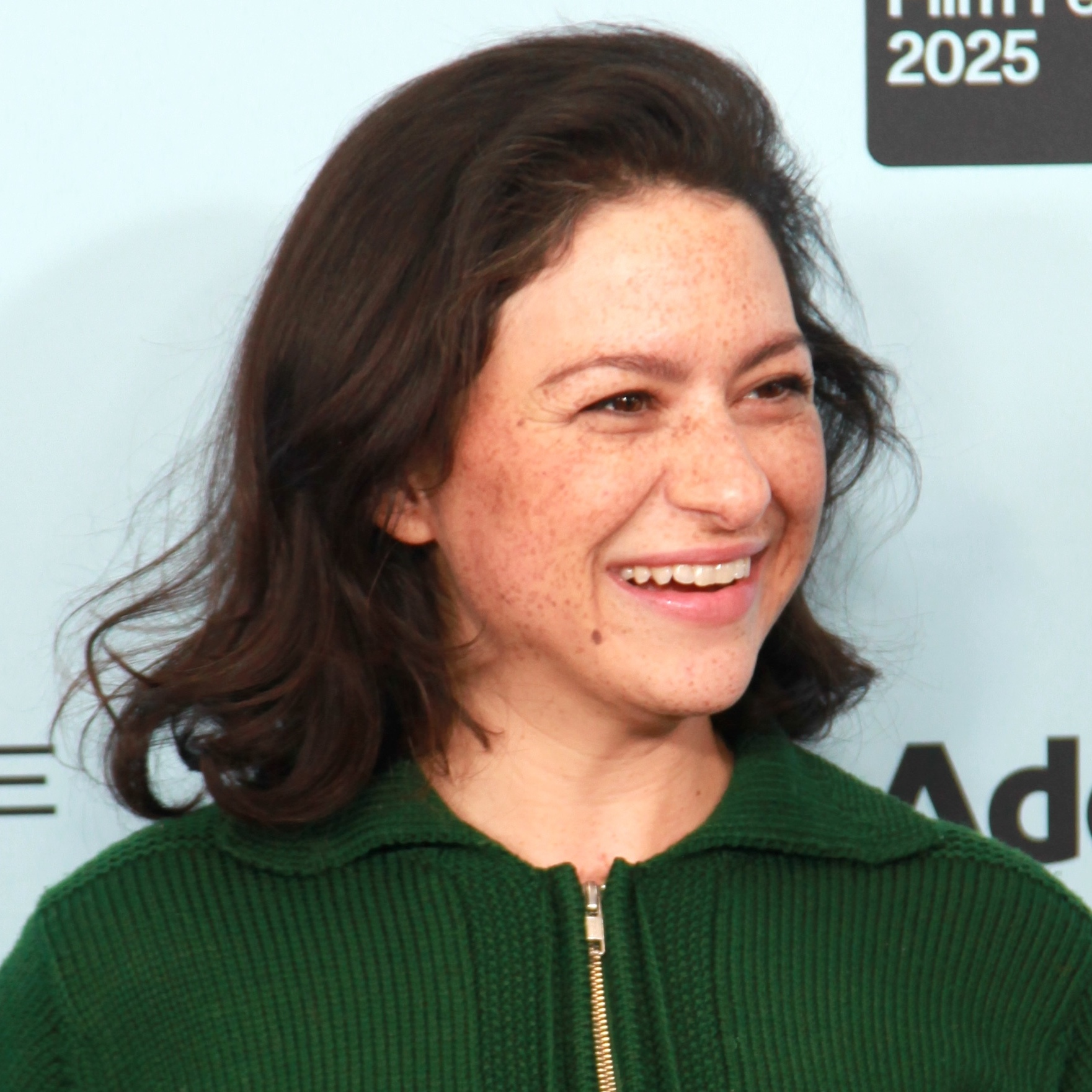
Shawkat at the Sundance Film Festival in 2025

Six years after the series was canceled by Fox, filming for a revived fourth season of Arrested Development began on August 7, 2012, and Shawkat reprised her role as Maeby Fünke. The season consists of 15 new episodes, which debuted simultaneously on Netflix on May 26, 2013. Each episode focuses on one particular character, with Shawkat's Maeby, now a high school senior, featured in episode 12, "Señoritis," and appearing in several other episodes of the season. Shawkat appears briefly in Ryan Trecartin's 2013 art film, Center Jenny.

In 2015, Shawkat guest-starred on Broad City, portraying the romantic interest and look-alike of Ilana Glazer's character for one episode; the two were attracted to one another due only to their similar appearances. Leading up to the episode, many had remarked on the physical similarities Shawkat and Glazer bear to one another.

=== 2016–present: Search Party and other work ===
Shawkat starred in the lead role of Dory Sief on the TBS comedy Search Party from 2016-2022. Shawkat produced 30 episodes of the show and directed one. She won the Gracie Award for Outstanding Female Actor in a Breakthrough Role in 2017 for her work on the show.

In 2019, Shawkat starred in the film Animals (directed by Australian director Sophie Hyde) as Tyler, a high-living American partier in Dublin. It is a film about a friendship that changes after Laura (played by Holliday Grainger) gets engaged to her teetotalling boyfriend. Shawkat said that she had never played a character like Tyler before, and found her previous characters more relatable. She was "excited to play someone who was so fun, but so damaged". In 2026, she made her stage debut in the revival of the Clare Barron play You Got Older starring opposite Peter Friedman at the Cherry Lane Theater Off-Broadway.

== Personal life ==
When not acting, Shawkat enjoys singing, drawing, and painting. She occasionally sings in jazz bars, where she sings jazz standards; her grandfather taught her many of the songs she knows. At one point, Shawkat attempted to learn welding, hoping to make metal sculptures. She considers it essential for her to pursue different forms of art, stating, "They feed each other. If I didn't have the other ones, I don't think I could just act."

Shawkat is bisexual.

She is in a relationship with Phil Burgers. On November 15, 2023, she gave birth to their first child.

In September 2025, Shawkat signed an open pledge with Film Workers for Palestine pledging not to work with Israeli film institutions "that are implicated in genocide and apartheid against the Palestinian people".

== Acting credits ==
=== Film ===
Key
†	Denotes films that have not yet been released

Year	Title	Role	Notes
1999	Three Kings	Amir's Daughter	
2005	Rebound	Amy	
2006	Deck the Halls	Madison Finch	
2008	Bart Got a Room	Camille	
2008	Prom Wars	Diana Riggs	
2009	Amreeka	Salma Halaby	
2009	Whip It	Pash Amini	
2010	The Runaways	Robin Robbins	
2011	The Lie	Seven	
2011	Cedar Rapids	Bree	
2011	The Oranges	Vanessa Walling	
2012	Damsels in Distress	Mad Madge	
2012	That's What She Said	Clementine	
2012	Ruby Sparks	Mabel	
2012	The Brass Teapot	Louise	
2013	May in the Summer	Dalia	
2013	The End of Love	Alia Shawkat	Cameo
2013	The To Do List	Fiona Forster	
2013	Night Moves	Surprise	
2013	The Moment	Jessie Jamil	
2014	Life After Beth	Roz	
2014	Wild Canaries	Jean	
2015	The Final Girls	Gertie Michaels	
2015	The Driftless Area	Carrie	
2015	Nasty Baby	Wendy	Also co-producer
2015	Adam Green's Aladdin	Emily	
2015	Green Room	Sam	
2015	Me Him Her	Laura	
2016	The Intervention	Lola	
2016	Pee-wee's Big Holiday	Bella	
2016	Paint It Black	Josie	
2016	20th Century Women	Trish	
2017	Izzy Gets the F*ck Across Town	Agatha Benson	
2018	Blaze	Sybil Rosen	
2018	Duck Butter	Naima	Also writer and executive producer
2019	Animals	Tyler	
2019	First Cow	Woman with Dog	
2019	I Lost My Body	Gabrielle (voice)	English dub
2020	The Letter Room	Rosita	Short film
2021	Love Spreads	Kelly	
2021	Being the Ricardos	Madelyn Pugh	
2022	Jackass Forever	Herself	Cameo
2022	The Listener	Sharon (voice)	
2023	Drift	Callie	
2024	Blink Twice	Jess	
2025	Atropia	Fayruz	Also executive producer
2025	The Tiger	Katie	Short film
2026	The Wrong Girls	Molly	Also executive producer
2027	42.6 Years		Filming

=== Television ===
Year	Title	Role	Notes
1999	JAG	Young Sarah MacKenzie	Episode: "Second Sight"
2000	The Trial of Old Drum	Dee	TV film
2001–2002	State of Grace	Young Hannah Rayburn	Main cast; 40 episodes
2002	Presidio Med	Tara Wegman	Episode: "Good Question"
2003	Without a Trace	Siobhan Arintero	Episode: "Maple Street"
2003	Boomtown	Denise Stein	Episode: "Home Invasion"
2003–2006; 2013; 2018–2019	Arrested Development	Mae "Maeby" Fünke	Main cast; 79 episodes
2006	Veronica Mars	Stacy Wells	Episode: "The Rapes of Graff"
2006	Not Like Everyone Else	Brandi Blackbear	TV film
2007	The Business	Screenwriting Manicurist	2 episodes
2008	The Bad Mother's Handbook	Charlotte	TV film
2008	The Starter Wife	Robin	3 episodes
2010	The League	April	Episode: "The Expert Witness"
2013	NTSF:SD:SUV::	Gail	Episode: "Burn After Killing"
2014	Drunk History	Frances Cleveland	Episode: "First Ladies"
2014	Robot Chicken	Baroness / Lucy Pevensie / Minerva McGonagall (voice)	Episode: "G.I. Jogurt"
2014	Getting On	Colleen Hoover	4 episodes
2015	Adventure Time	Betsy Poundcake (voice)	Episode: "The Diary"
2015	Broad City	Adele	Episode: "Coat Check"
2015	Drunk History	Virginia Hall	Episode: "Spies"
2016	Portlandia	Mayor's Kid	Episode: "Shville"
2016	Animals.	Sharon (voice)	Episode: "Rats."
2016	Drunk History	Alexander Hamilton	Episode: "Hamilton"
2016–2017	Adventure Time	Charlie (voice)	2 episodes
2016–2022	Search Party	Dory Sief	Main cast; 50 episodes Also producer Directed episode "The Imposter"
2017–2019	Transparent	Lila	8 episodes
2017–2020	Big Mouth	Roland (voice)	3 episodes
2018–2023	Summer Camp Island	Blanche / Cinnamon Raisin Toast / Butter Goth (voice)	15 episodes
2019	Living with Yourself	Maia	2 episodes
2020	The Shivering Truth	(voice)	Episode: "Nesslessness"
2020	Moonbase 8	Alix	Episode: "Visitors"
2021	Cinema Toast	(voice)	Episode: "Warehouse Friends"
2021	Pride	Madeleine Tress	Episode: "1950s: People Had Parties"
2021	Ultra City Smiths	Little Grace / Woman's Voice (voice)	5 episodes
2022–2024	The Old Man	Angela Adams	Main cast
2023	Rugrats	Trish (voice)	Episode: "Reptar Day!/Mission to the Little"
2023	Scavengers Reign	Levi (voice)	8 episodes
2024–2025	Star Wars: Skeleton Crew	Kh'ymm (voice)	2 episodes
2025	Severance	Gwendolyn Y.	2 episodes
2025	#1 Happy Family USA	Mona Hussein (voice)	Main cast
2025	Poker Face	Kate Forster / Amelia Peek	Episode: "A New Lease on Death"
2025	Lego Marvel Avengers: Strange Tails	Meryet, Train Driver (voice)	Disney + Television special

=== Theater ===
Year	Title	Role	Playwright	Venue	Ref.
2026	You Got Older	Mae	Clare Barron	Cherry Lane Theater, Off-Broadway	

=== Music videos ===
Year	Title	Artist
2011	"Our Deal"	Best Coast
2017	"Don't Take the Money"	Bleachers

=== Podcasts ===
Year	Title	Role	Notes
2018	Sandra	Helen Perera (voice)	Main role, 7 episodes

== Awards and nominations ==
Year	Award	Category	Work	Result
2002	Young Artist Award	Best Performance in a TV Comedy Series – Leading Young Actress	State of Grace	Nominated
2004	TV Land Award	Future Classic	Arrested Development	Won
2005	Young Artist Award	Best Performance in a TV Series (Comedy or Drama) – Supporting Young Actress	Arrested Development	Won
2005	Screen Actors Guild Award	Outstanding Performance by an Ensemble in a Comedy Series	Arrested Development	Nominated
2006	Screen Actors Guild Award	Outstanding Performance by an Ensemble in a Comedy Series	Arrested Development	Nominated
2014	Screen Actors Guild Award	Outstanding Performance by an Ensemble in a Comedy Series	Arrested Development	Nominated
2017	Gracie Award	Actress in a Breakthrough Role	Search Party	Won
