= LendingTree =

American fintech company

LendingTree, Inc.
- Company type: Public
- Traded as: Nasdaq: TREE
- Founded: 1996; 30 years ago
- Headquarters: Charlotte, North Carolina, U.S.
- Founder: Doug Lebda
- Key people: Scott Peyree (CEO); Jason Bengel (CFO); Steve Ozonian (board chairman)
- Revenue: ▲US$900 million (2024)
- Operating income: ▲US$44.6 million (2024)
- Net income: ▲US$−42 million (2024)
- Total assets: ▼US$768 million (2024)
- Total equity: ▼US$109 million (2024)
- Employees: 937 (2024)
- Website: lendingtree.com

LendingTree, Inc. is an online lending marketplace, founded in 1996 and headquartered in Charlotte, North Carolina. The business platform allows potential borrowers to connect with multiple loan operators to find optimal terms for loans, credit cards, deposit accounts, insurance, etc. LendingTree allows borrowers to shop and compare competitive rates and terms across an array of financial products. Other additional services include financing tools, comparative loan searches and borrowing information.

== History ==
=== Founding ===
After graduating from Bucknell University, Doug Lebda went to work for PricewaterhouseCoopers in Pittsburgh as an auditor and consultant. During the process of purchasing his first home via a mortgage, he found the process of comparing numerous resources time-consuming. Lebda sought a better way to improve this process in the marketplace. Lebda subsequently started CreditSource USA in late 1996; a year later the new company was rebranded as LendingTree. In 1998, LendingTree was launched online.

=== IAC ownership ===
LendingTree went through an initial public offering (IPO) on February 15, 2000. In May 2003, LendingTree was acquired by IAC/InterActiveCorp, former owner of Ticketmaster, Home Shopping Network and Match.com. In 2004, LendingTree acquired HomeLoanCenter.com and formed LendingTree Loans. After five years, LendingTree spun off from IAC to join newly established Tree.com, Inc. Tree.com was the parent company of several brands and businesses in the financial services and real estate industries including LendingTree.com; GetSmart.com; DegreeTree.com; LendingTreeAutos.com; and DoneRight.com.

In 2015, LendingTree disassembled the Tree.com umbrella to focus on its core brand, LendingTree, which incorporated business loans, personal loans, debt consolidation, free credit scores, and student loans along with its core mortgage products home loans, mortgage refinance, and home equity.

Since 2019, LendingTree has served as the official name sponsor of the annual college football bowl played in Mobile, Alabama, the LendingTree Bowl.

On October 13, 2025, LendingTree announced that founder and CEO Doug Lebda died the previous day in an all-terrain vehicle collision. The company named COO Scott Peyree as the new CEO, and Steve Ozonian as chairman of the board.

== Acquisitions ==
In 2009, LendingTree acquired the personal financial management website Thrive. In August 2016, it acquired SimpleTuition, a company focused on student loans. Subsequent acquisitions include CompareCards (2016), DepositAccounts.com (2017), MagnifyMoney (2017), SnapCap (2017), Student Loan Hero (2018), QuoteWizard (2018), and ValuePenguin (2018).

== 2024 data breach ==
In 2024, the Lending Tree platform QuoteWizard suffered a data breach and extortion attempt as part of the 2024 Snowflake mass hacking campaign. The stolen data included personally identifiable information (PII) of nearly 50 million customers. It also included partial customer driver's license numbers, driving histories, risk profiles, and auto information such as auto make/model and VIN numbers

== See also ==
- NerdWallet
- Money (magazine)
- CreditKarma
- SuperMoney
