= SoHo Playhouse =

Theater in New York City

Coordinates: 40.726449°N 74.004359°W

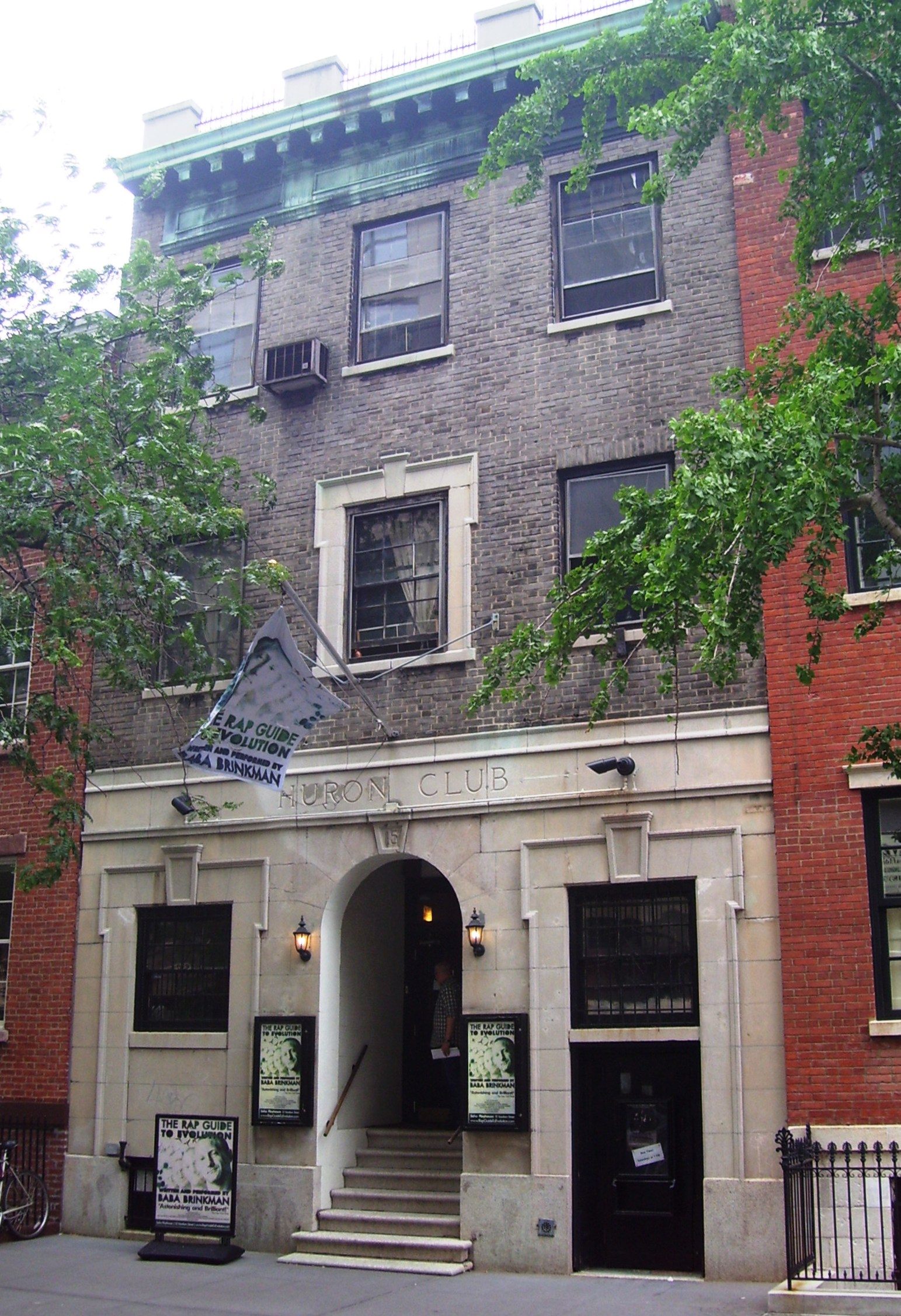
- SoHo Playhouse
- Interactive map of SoHo Playhouse
- Address: 15 Vandam Street; Manhattan, New York City; United States
- Capacity: 178
- Type: Off-Broadway

Website
- www.sohoplayhouse.com

The SoHo Playhouse is an Off-Broadway theatre at 15 Vandam Street in the Hudson Square area of Manhattan.

The theatre opened in 1962 as the Village South Theatre with the original production of Jean Erdman's musical play The Coach with the Six Insides which was based upon James Joyce's last novel Finnegans Wake. The following year Edward Albee used profits from Who's Afraid of Virginia Woolf? to establish the Playwrights' Unit at the Village South Theatre; an organization which provided a platform for untested new playwrights to premiere their works. The theatre closed in 1970, with its last production being Michael Preston Barr and Dion McGregor's musical Who's Happy Now?. It did still house plays for various off-Broadway productions under the simple name of 15 Van Dam. The theatre was home to the New York Academy of Theatrical Arts from 1970 until 1974.

It reopened in as the SoHo Playhouse in 1994 with a production of the play Grandma Sylvia's Funeral.

In recent years, Soho Playhouse serves to incubate and produce intimate new works. In 2023, this included the psychological thriller, Job, featuring Peter Friedman and Sydney Lemmon; Ed Byrne's comedic solo show titled Tragedy Plus Time, Martin Dockery's absurdist thriller Inescapable and Florencia Iriondo's one-woman folk-pop musical, South.
