= Too Bad For Her =

2027 play by Clare Barron

- Original language: English
- Written by: Clare Barron
- Genre: Coming-of-age, romance, dark comedy

Premiere
- Date: January 9, 2027
- Place: Atlantic Theater Company, New York City
- Directed by: Anne Kauffman

Too Bad For Her is an upcoming play by Clare Barron. It is considered a coming-of-age dark comedy, revolving around love, art, and the consequences of a thirty-year affair. The play is expected to debut off-Broadway at the Linda Gross Theater produced by the Atlantic Theater Company.

== Premise ==
The play has been described as "a compassionate and perverse exploration of a thirty-year affair and its consequences. A play about love, art, and living outside the bounds.

== Cast ==
Role	Huron Station Playhouse Workshop Reading (2026)	Atlantic Theater Company Off-Broadway Debut (2027)
Frank	Rich Sommer	Peter Mark Kendal
Winn	Rich Sommer	Greg Keller
Justine	Midori Francis	Alison Pill
Josie	Gillian Jacobs	Sydney Lemmon
Aubrey	Anna Camp	Renate Friedman
Davey	Calvin Seabrooks	Ato Blankson-Wood
Older Josie	Jane Kaczmarek	TBA
Older Justine	Emily Kuroda	TBA

== Production ==
Stage workshop readings took place at the Huron Station Playhouse in July 2026 with a cast that included Rich Sommer, Gillian Jacobs, and Anna Camp. It was announced it will make its Off-Broadway debut at the Linda Gross Theater produced by the Atlantic Theater Company with performances running from January 9-February 14, 2027. The production will be directed by Anne Kauffman and star Sydney Lemmon, Allison Pill and Ato Blankson-Wood.
