= Anne L. Alstott =

American legal scholar

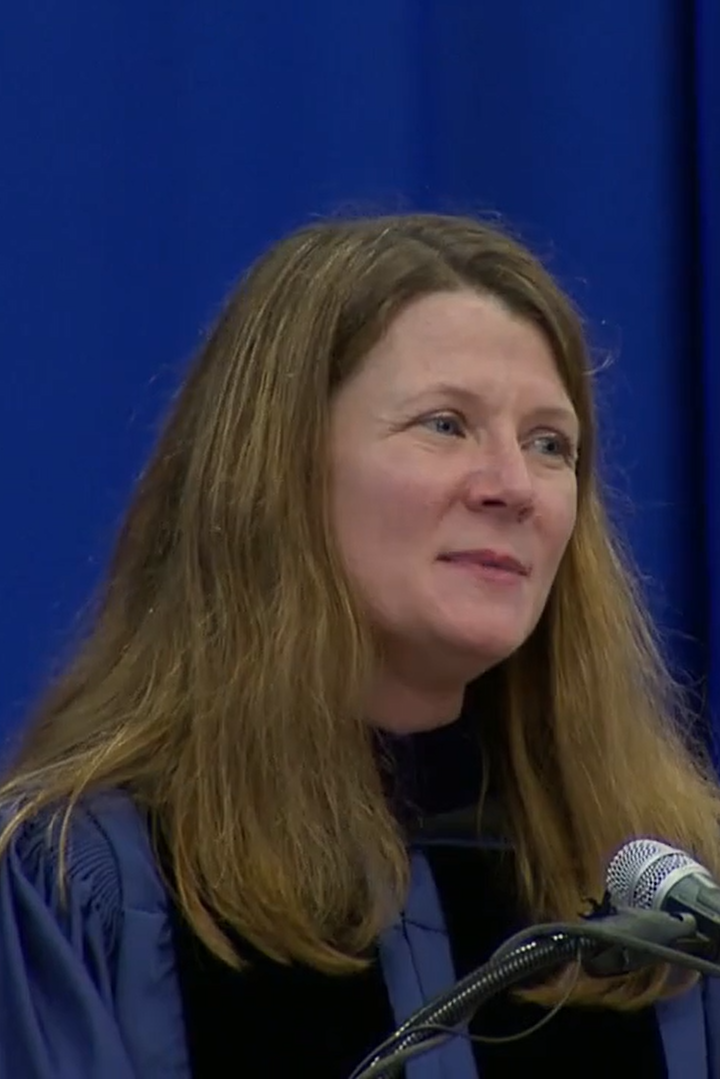
- Alstott during the Yale Law School 2013 commencement
- Born: Indianapolis, Indiana, U.S.
- Education: Georgetown University (BA); Yale University (JD)
- Years active: 1992-present
- Board member of: Executive Committee (Tax Section) of the New York State Bar Association (1992-93)
- Spouse: L. Gordon Crovitz (m. 1986, divorced)
- Website: https://www.annealstott.blog/

Anne Lester Alstott is an American legal scholar. She is the Jacquin D. Bierman Professor in Taxation at Yale Law School.

== Career ==
She graduated summa cum laude from Georgetown University in 1984 and graduated from Yale Law School in 1987. Following law school, she served as an associate attorney at Sullivan & Cromwell and as an Attorney Advisor at the Office of Tax Policy (United States Department of the Treasury).

In 1992, Alstott became associate professor at Columbia Law School, where she taught until 1996. She then became visiting associate professor (1996–97) and professor of law (1997-2004) at Yale Law School. In 2004, she became Jacquin D. Bierman's Professor in Taxation. She stayed at Yale Law School until 2008. She was deputy dean for two terms at Yale Law School, during the fall of 2002 and in the years 2004–05. From 2008 to 2011, she served as Manley O. Hudson Professor of Law at Harvard Law School and as director of its Fund for Tax and Fiscal Research. She then returned as Jacquin D. Bierman Professor in Taxation to Yale Law School, where she still works today.

She was elected a Fellow of the American Academy of Arts and Sciences in 2024.

== Bibliography ==
- The Public Option: How to Expand Freedom, Increase Opportunity, and Promote Equality. With Ganesh Sitaraman. Cambridge (US): Harvard University Press, 2019.
- A New Deal for Old Age: Toward a Progressive Retirement. Cambridge (US): Harvard University Press, 2016.
- No Exit: What Parents Owe Children and What Society Owes Parents. Oxford: Oxford University Press, 2004.
- The Stakeholder Society. With Bruce Ackerman. New Haven: Yale University Press, 1999.

=== Textbooks ===
- Graetz, Schenk, and Alstott's Federal Income Taxation, Principles and Policies, 8th. With Michael J. Graetz and Deborah H. Schenk. New York City: Foundation Press, 2018.
- Taxation in Six Concepts: A Student's Guide. Riverwoods: CCH, Inc., 2018.
