= Amy S. Mitchell =

Journalism and technology researcher

Amy Schenkenberg Mitchell
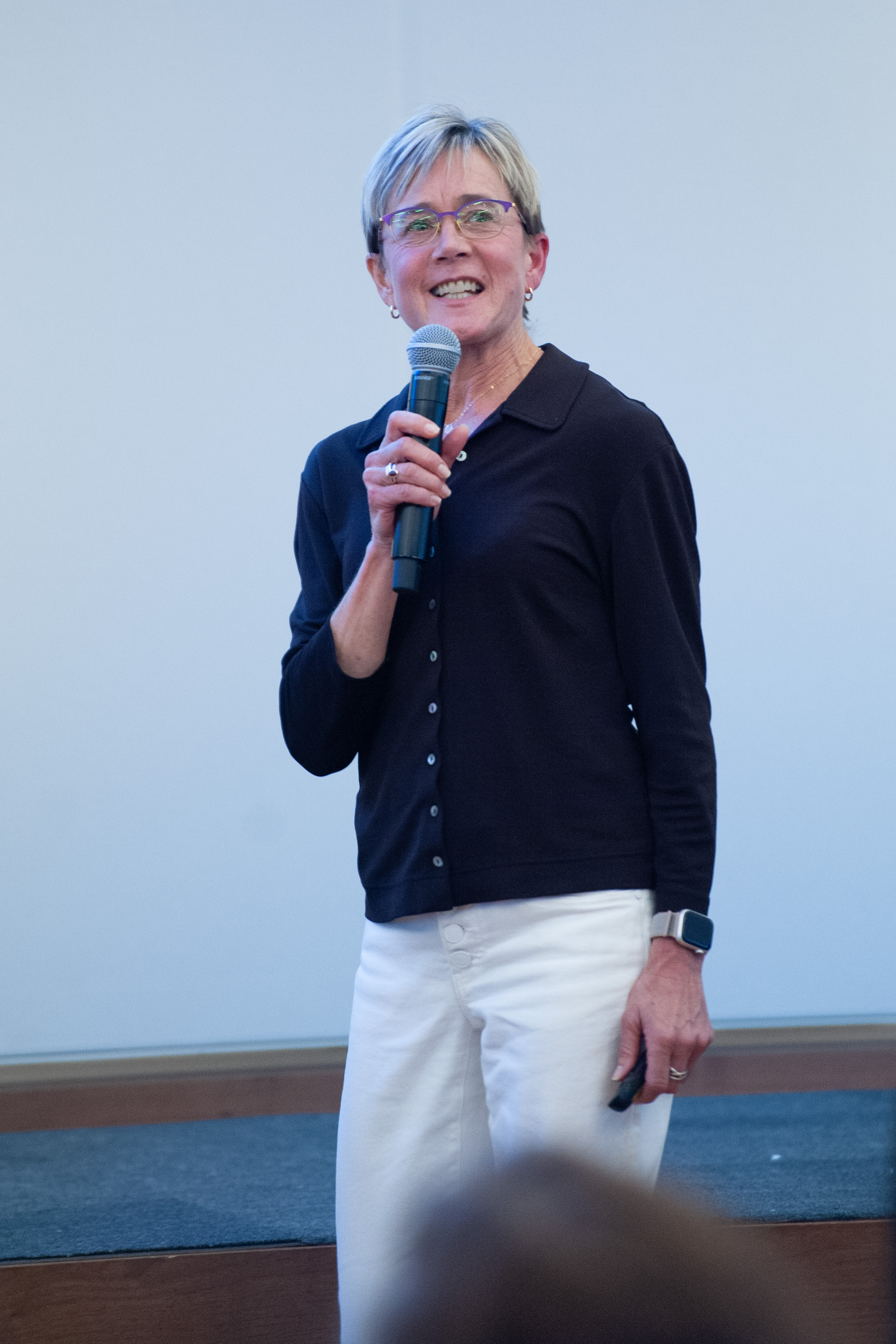
- Mitchell in 2026
- Born: Amy Schenkenberg Mitchell; St. Louis, Missouri
- Education: Georgetown University

Amy Schenkenberg Mitchell (born October 15, 1969) is the executive director of the Center for News, Technology & Innovation (CNTI), which conducts research on topics related to the intersection of journalism and technology. Before founding CNTI in 2023, she was managing director of news and information research at the Pew Research Center.

== Early life ==
Mitchell was born in St. Louis, Missouri, to Philip R. Schenkenberg III, a research chemist at Monsanto, and Mary Martin Schenkenberg, who was the first woman to serve as principal of St. Louis University High School, a Jesuit school for boys. She graduated from Nerinx Hall, a Roman Catholic girls school in Webster Groves, Missouri, and Georgetown University.

== Career ==
Mitchell’s interest in research, journalism and public policy began while she was in college, working part-time as a content analysis coder for the Times Mirror Center for the People & the Press (which evolved into the Pew Research Center). After graduating from Georgetown in 1992, Mitchell spent five years as a congressional research assistant for Norman Ornstein, a political scientist and scholar at the American Enterprise Institute.

In 1997 she joined the Project for Excellence in Journalism (PEJ), founded by journalist Tom Rosenstiel and funded by the Pew Charitable Trusts. Hired as a staff assistant, Mitchell was promoted to associate director in 2003 and was named acting director in 2012. In October 2013 PEJ was renamed “Pew Research Center’s Journalism Project” with Mitchell as the director of journalism research.

During her 25 years at PEJ and Pew Research Center, Mitchell developed expertise in research design, methods evaluation and analysis. She was responsible for the center’s research related to news and other forms of information, including the ways that the public accesses, engages with and creates news; the information that news organizations are providing; and the evolving role of technology as it intersects with journalism.

She created the methodology for the Political Polarization & Media Habits report, first published in 2014, that studied political polarization in Americans’ news media habits. It was updated in 2020, and its findings have been adapted for use in other Pew reports, including the American News Pathways project and ongoing surveys about trust in news.

Mitchell also led the creation of Pew’s State of the News Media report, which tracked trends in journalism and in the public’s attitudes about the news media. Published annually from 2004 to 2016 and as fact sheets on specific issues thereafter, it reported on key audience and economic indicators, examining “the shifting ways in which Americans seek out news and information, how news organizations get their revenue, and the resources available to American journalists as they seek to inform the public about important events of the day.”

In 2022 Mitchell left Pew to begin work on what became the Center for News, Innovation & Technology, which was formally launched the following year. She and her board chair, former McClatchy Co. president and CEO Craig Forman, raised $3 million from funders (including the John S. and James L. Knight Foundation, Google, the MacArthur Foundation, the Lenfest Institute and Craig Newmark Philanthropies) to create what Axios described in August 2023 as “an independent policy research center focused on addressing global internet issues, such as disinformation, algorithmic accountability, and the economic health of the news industry.”

“Our goal is to provide the data and evidence necessary for informed discussions about the future of journalism,” she told E&P Reports, a video podcast from Editor & Publisher, a news industry publication, in October 2024.

Her work has been cited by sources as diverse as the BBC, CNN, PBS, Fox News, The Economist, The Associated Press, The Washington Post and Daedalus, the journal of the American Academy of Arts & Sciences, among others.

She has been a featured speaker at well-known conferences and other public events, such as the United Nations Internet Governance Forum, the Knight Media Forum, the Council on Foreign Relations, the International Symposium for Online Journalism, South by Southwest and the Aspen Ideas Festival. In late 2024 NiemanLab included her in its list of “some of the smartest people in journalism” who were asked to predict the future of the news media in 2025. She is a member of the International Advisory Group of M20, an independent initiative created to ensure that media integrity issues are reflected in the G20 policy agenda and has served on the advisory board of the Norman Lear Center's Media Impact Project at the University of Southern California.

== Awards ==
2011: Sigma Delta Chi Award: "'The Tablet Revolution' and 'Non-Profit News: Assessing a New Landscape in Journalism': Two Groundbreaking Studies of Emerging Trends in Journalism" by Tom Rosenstiel, Amy Mitchell and the staff of the Pew Research Center’s Project for Excellence in Journalism

2008: Bart Richards Award for Media Criticism (from the Donald P. Bellisario College of Communications, Pennsylvania State University): Project for Excellence in Journalism

2004: Bart Richards Award for Media Criticism (from the Donald P. Bellisario College of Communications, Pennsylvania State University): "State of the News Media" by the Project for Excellence in Journalism

== Personal ==
Mitchell lives in Silver Spring, Maryland. She has three adult children.
