= Jim Friedlich =

American media executive (born 1967)

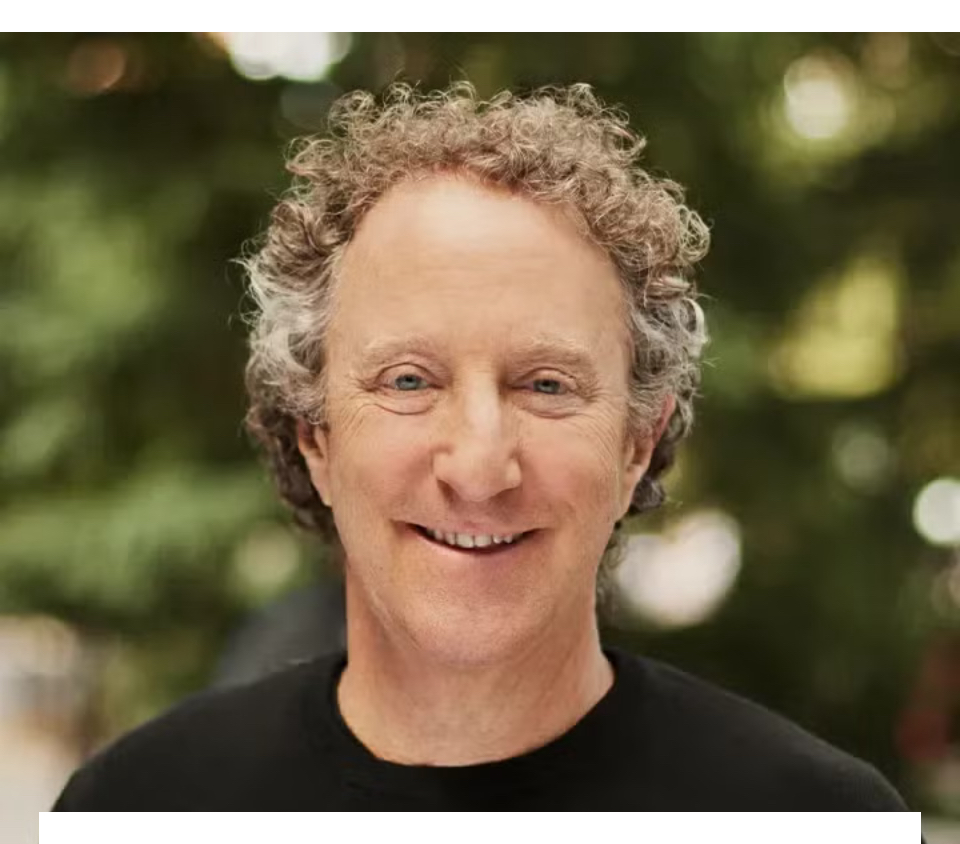
- Born: February 22, 1957 (age 69); Montclair, New Jersey, U.S.
- Education: Wesleyan University (BA); Stanford Graduate School of Business (MBA)
- Occupations: Chief Executive Officer and Executive Director of the Lenfest Institute
- Spouse: Melissa Stern (m. 1986)
- Children: Max Wolf Friedlich

James Friedlich (born February 22, 1957) is an American media and philanthropy executive. He is chief executive officer and executive director of the Lenfest Institute for Journalism, a non-profit organization that supports innovative journalism initiatives nationwide and is the owner of The Philadelphia Inquirer. He is on the board of directors of digital jobs marketplace Dice Holdings, Inc. (DHI, NYSE), and is an investor in several digital media and technology companies. Friedlich held senior operating positions at Dow Jones and The Wall Street Journal and was a board director of CNBC International. He was a seed investor in Business Insider before its sale to Axel Springer in 2015.

== Career ==
=== Dow Jones and Company ===
From 1990 to 2000, Friedlich managed the global advertising sales, consumer marketing and business development of various Dow Jones & Company newspapers, magazines, web sites, TV channels and conferences. He had business responsibility for all WSJ foreign-language print editions as well as full global sales, marketing and business development responsibility for all Dow Jones international holdings on the Internet, on TV, and in print. Among his responsibilities were The Wall Street Journal, The Wall Street Journal Americas – the largest-circulation Journal edition outside of the United States – and CNBC Europe and CNBC Asia, as well as the local language editions of The Wall Street Journal in Europe, Asia, Latin America and the Middle East.

From 1999 to 2000, Friedlich headed Business Development for Dow Jones' Electronic Publishing Group, including WSJ.com, Dow Jones Newswires, and Dow Jones Indexes. Friedlich played key roles in the creation of a number of new print, Internet, TV and conference properties while at Dow Jones. He was responsible for the international business launch of WSJ.com, co-founded The Wall Street Journal Americas, and launched Dow Jones Conferences, the company’s first events business. He served on the board of directors of several international media companies and publications including CNBC Europe, CNBC Asia, Nikkei International, Vedomosti, a Russian language business newspaper joint venture with the Financial Times, America Economia, and the Far Eastern Economic Review. He also served as a managing director of Handelsblatt-Dow Jones, GmbH, a joint venture with Germany’s leading business publisher.

=== ZelnickMedia ===
Friedlich co-founded New York-based media private equity firm ZelnickMedia (now ZMC) with Wesleyan University classmate Strauss Zelnick in 2001 as one of four original partners. From 2001 to 2011, Friedlich specialized in investments in publishing, business-to-business media, professional information and marketing services. He was integrally involved in investments in Take-Two Interactive Software (TTWO), Alloy Media, ITN Networks, and Time-Life. Friedlich served from 2005 to 2013 as chairman of the board of Naylor LLC, a North American business-to-business publisher and events company before its sale to RLJ Equity Partners in 2013, the private equity firm of BET founder Bob Johnson.

=== Empirical Media Advisors ===
Friedlich founded Empirical Media Advisors with Jack Griffin in 2011. He was appointed CEO in 2014 when Griffin left to become CEO of Tribune Publishing, an Empirical client. Empirical advises news and media companies on their digital transition, and has worked closely with The Wall Street Journal, Reuters, Bloomberg, Tribune Publishing, The Philadelphia Inquirer and other news organizations in the U.S. and abroad. According to press reports, the firm advised investors on the prospective purchase of the New York Daily News and The Boston Globe, and was instrumental in the digital-first redesign of The Dallas Morning News. Empirical has been quoted widely on media and journalism topics, including by The Wall Street Journal, Fortune magazine, and The Washington Post. Empirical Media was acquired by cable television pioneer H.F. “Gerry” Lenfest who donated the company to the Institute for Journalism in New Media, later renamed The Lenfest Institute for Journalism. Empirical Media and its team of advisors have been fully integrated into the Institute, offering guidance to news organizations around the world.

=== Digital Media Investments ===
Friedlich was active as an early-stage investor in digital content, news and advertising technology, often co-investing with former Wall Street Journal executives Gordon Crovitz and Craig Forman through NextNews Ventures, an early-stage private investment fund. Friedlich was a seed investor in Business Insider, with Henry Blodget, Kevin Ryan, Crovitz and others, and in subsequent investment rounds with Jeff Bezos. Press accounts have cited NextNews Ventures investments in Nuzzel, a social media curation tool, with Andreesen Horowitz, Poncho [a weather chat bot] with Betaworks, Lerer Hippeau Ventures, Comcast, and RRE Ventures, Watchup, a news video player, with Tribune Media, and Skift, a travel news company, with Lerer Hippeau.

=== The Lenfest Institute for Journalism ===
Friedlich was named in September 2016 to lead The Lenfest Institute for Journalism, a non-profit organization that supports innovative news initiatives nationwide, with a special emphasis on metropolitan areas, such as Philadelphia. Founded by cable TV pioneer H.F. Lenfest, the Institute’s mission is to develop effective business models for journalism on the local and metro level in the digital age. The institute is the parent company of the Philadelphia Media Network, the owner of The Philadelphia Inquirer. The Institute and the Knight Foundation announced in February 2017 a $4.8 million three-year grant program designed to assist over a dozen major U.S. news organizations in their digital transformation.

== Personal ==
Friedlich attended Dartmouth College, is a graduate of Wesleyan University with a BA in English magna cum laude, and received his MBA from the Stanford University Graduate School of Business. He serves on the board of directors of The Door, a New York-based youth services organization; the Bard College Center for Civic Engagement; and WFMU, a public radio station.

Friedlich lives with his wife Melissa Stern, an arts journalist and studio artist, and their son Max Friedlich, a playwright and television writer.

== See also ==
- List of American media executives
