= Florencia Iriondo =

Argentine-American playwright, composer, actor, singer, and showrunner

Florencia Iriondo is an Argentine-American playwright, composer, actor, singer, and showrunner. She is best known for her Off-Broadway musical, South, which won the 2023 Pipeline Arts Foundation Award for New Musical Theatre. Iriondo wrote the book, music, and lyrics, and she also stars in the one-woman show.

Iriondo was born and raised in Buenos Aires, Argentina. She currently lives and works in the East Village of New York City, where she has resided since 2013. She has also lived in New Zealand and Ireland.

== Career ==
Iriondo worked at LinkedIn for many years, where she was the company's first showrunner and founder of original video. While working at LinkedIn, she would write and perform music and theater in her spare time. She began her first show, South, in 2014 when she wrote the opening song, "Vengo del Sur," at a teal upright piano in her East Village apartment. She left LinkedIn in 2022 to pursue musical theater and her show, South, full time.

As a writer and performer, Iriondo was a Town Stage 2020 Sokoloff Arts Creative Fellow and a recipient of the National Alliance for Musical Theatre's 2022-23 Writers Residency Grants.

Her first show, Back Home, was originally written for three women. This show would ultimately become South, a one-woman show featuring Iriondo.

== South, the musical ==
Iriondo's show, South, opened Off-Broadway at Soho Playhouse in October 2023. Iriondo wrote the book, lyrics, and music, and she is the only actor in the one-act, one-woman show. The acoustic score was written and arranged along with fellow musicians, Federico Díaz and Luis D'Elias, with a mixture of Argentine and North American pop influences.

Though Iriondo performs the one-woman show alone, she is accompanied on stage by two musicians, guitarist Federico Díaz and Latin Grammy Award winner Agustin Uriburu, playing the cello and guitar.

South was developed in residency at the New York Stage and Theater in the summer of 2021 and at The Eugene O’Neill Theater Center. and it was the winner of the Pipeline Arts Foundation Award for New Musical Theatre in 2023.

The show is inspired by Iriondo's experiences as a Latina immigrant in New York City, and it explores themes of family and belonging. It tells the fictional story of Chica, who fled her home in the southernmost tip of Argentina to live in New York City. The musical follows Chica's journey of self-discovery and identity as she navigates a new language, a new culture, and a big new city.

The cast album was recorded in Argentina.
