= Craig Forman =

Technology entrepreneur and journalist

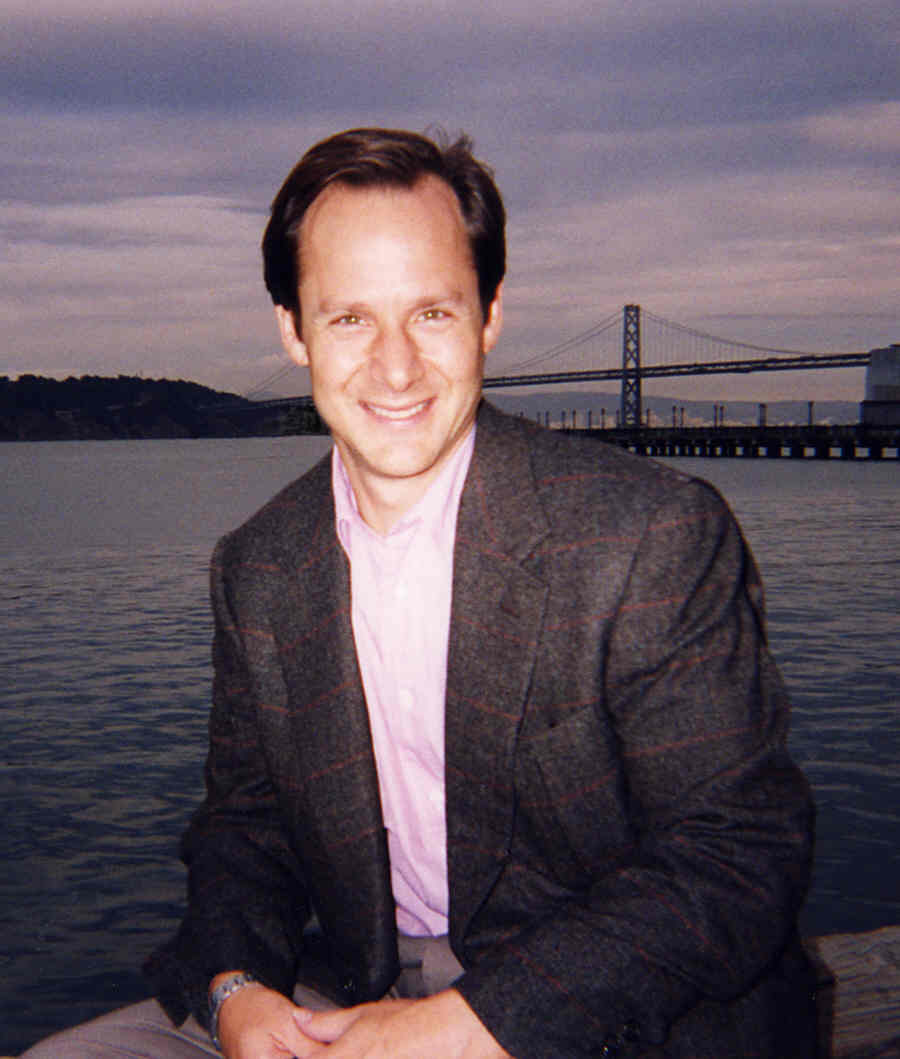
- Craig Forman in San Francisco
- Born: 1961; New York City
- Education: Princeton University, Princeton, NJ

Craig Forman is an American entrepreneur, media executive, and former foreign correspondent who was chief executive officer of The McClatchy Company. He previously worked at The Wall Street Journal. He is a partner at NextNews Ventures, an early-stage private investment fund based in San Francisco and is the Executive Chair of the Center for News, Technology & Innovation. Forman has been a non-resident fellow at the Shorenstein Center at Harvard University's Kennedy School of Government.

Forman is also the author of Be Luckier in Life, a career guide for business success, published by Iver Publishing.

== Career ==
Forman has held senior positions at Yahoo!, Earthlink, Dow Jones, and Time Warner.

Forman worked at The Wall Street Journal as an editor in the London bureau and as Tokyo bureau chief, among other positions. While based in London as the Journal's Deputy Bureau Chief, Forman was a member of the 1991 Persian Gulf War reporting team which later became a finalist for the Pulitzer Prize.

After leaving The Wall Street Journal, Forman became a senior operating executive at Time Warner's CNN Group and Time Inc. divisions. He was also a member of the management team that took Infoseek public. As a vice-president at CNN Financial News, Forman led the team for CNNfn.com. As a vice president of worldwide development at Time Inc. New Media, Forman managed the internet businesses of Fortune and Money magazines while also CEO of Thrive, a joint venture with AOL. He also played an influential role in helping Time Warner develop an independent internet strategy before its combination with AOL in 2000.

Forman also worked for four years as CEO and co-founder of Success Television LLP and MyPrimeTime Inc., a television production and venture-backed internet company. Forman and his team produced two business and lifestyle PBS television series, Great Entrepreneurs and Great Leaders, as well as broadband programming and an award-winning internet site targeted at baby boomers.

In March 2006, Forman joined EarthLink as its executive vice president, as well as president of its Access and Audience division and chief product officer.

Forman has been on a variety of public and private company boards. He was executive chairman at mobile app advertising network Appia Inc. and an investor and board member at several other startups in telecom, technology, and media. Along with colleagues Gordon Crovitz and Jim Friedlich, Forman co-founded and became a general partner at NextNews Ventures, an early-stage private investment fund which invests in media, technology and telecom startups. Forman was also executive chairman and a member of the board of directors of Where.com, a leading location-based mobile commerce company that was acquired by EBay Inc. in April 2011. Forman joined the Where.com board in 2009. Since 2012, Forman has been on the board of directors and the governance and nominating committee chair of Montreal-based local advertising company Yellow Pages Limited.

In October 2022, Forman joined the Council for Responsible Social Media project launched by Issue One to address the negative mental, civic, and public health impacts of social media in the United States co-chaired by former House Democratic Caucus Leader Dick Gephardt and former Massachusetts Lieutenant Governor Kerry Healey. In August 2023, Forman joined the Center for News, Technology & Innovation (CNTI), a global policy research center, as its Executive Chair.
