= SuperMoney =

Online financial services platform and AI-driven personal finance app

SuperMoney, LLC
- Company type: Private
- Founded: June 18, 2013; 13 years ago
- Headquarters: Santa Ana, California, United States
- Founder: Miron Lulic
- Key people: Miron Lulic (CEO)
- Industry: Financial technology
- Website: supermoney.com

SuperMoney, LLC is an online financial technology company that operates an AI-driven personal finance app and a financial services comparison platform. The company is headquartered in Santa Ana, California.

== History ==
SuperMoney was founded on June 18, 2013 by Miron Lulic and initially launched as a personal finance blog. The website later transitioned to a Yelp-like model, helping users compare and review financial services.

In April 2017, SuperMoney launched its personal loan offer engine, a marketplace that enabled consumers to submit a single loan application and receive pre-approved offers from multiple lending partners. In August 2017, the company launched an auto loan offer engine for vehicle purchase and refinance loans.

In May 2018, SuperMoney launched its point-of-sale financing platform for small businesses. In November 2018, SuperMoney launched a student loan refinancing marketplace.

In 2025, SuperMoney debuted its AI-powered personal finance app at Finovate, featuring automated budgeting, a financial insights feed, and an AI financial assistant that connects to users' bank accounts and credit data to provide personalized recommendations.

=== Recognition ===
SuperMoney has been named to the Inc. 5000 list of fastest-growing private companies in America for five consecutive years: #1,706 in 2021, #1,936 in 2022, #1,508 in 2023, #1,886 in 2024, and #4,565 in 2025.

Deloitte ranked SuperMoney on its Technology Fast 500 list of fastest-growing technology companies in North America for three consecutive years, from 2022 to 2024.

The Financial Times, in partnership with Statista, ranked SuperMoney #126 on The Americas' Fastest-Growing Companies 2024 list and #164 on the 2025 list.

SuperMoney was awarded Best Financial Product Comparison Service by Fintech Breakthrough in 2023 and 2024.

== Products and services ==
=== SuperMoney App ===
In 2025, SuperMoney launched a web and mobile (iOS & Android) personal finance app featuring AI-powered budgeting, account aggregation, credit monitoring, and an automated loan refinancing tool. The app connects to users' financial accounts to deliver personalized recommendations and was demonstrated at FinovateSpring 2025. The product launched on Product Hunt and achieved a Launch of the Day award

=== Comparison platform ===
SuperMoney operates as a comparison platform rather than a direct supplier of financial services. The company provides information and reviews across financial product categories including credit cards, personal loans, auto loans, student loans, mortgages, business loans, banking, insurance, and stock trading.

SuperMoney leverages its data to publish financial service industry studies that have been cited by media outlets such as CNBC, Business Insider, Forbes, Fox News, and Reader's Digest.

=== Loan offer engine ===
SuperMoney launched its loan offer engine in 2017. By October 2018, the platform had processed over $1 billion in financing requests, reaching $2 billion by August 2019 and $5 billion by May 2021. The engine allows consumers to fill out a single financing request, which is forwarded to matching lending partners who return pre-qualified offers in real time.

=== Point-of-sale financing ===
SuperMoney's point-of-sale financing platform, launched in May 2018, provides point of sale lending to merchants and service providers across industries including home improvement, health, and specialty retail. The platform is offered to merchants at no cost; SuperMoney generates revenue through its lending partners rather than charging merchants a discount rate fee.

== See also ==
- NerdWallet
- Credit Karma
- LendingTree
