= Lee Sunday Evans =

Director and choreographer

Lee Sunday Evans is a two-time Obie Award-winning director and choreographer. She is Artistic Director of Waterwell.

== Education ==
Evans attended college in Boston.

== Career ==
Evans has worked for theatres such as The Public Theater, Lincoln Center, Steppenwolf Theatre Company, and Playwrights Horizons and for festivals such as the Hudson Valley Shakespeare Festival, BAM Next Wave Festival, Edinburgh International Festival, and the Humana Festival.

In 2018, Evan was named Artistic Director of Waterwell.

In 2025, it was announced that Evans would be directing a musical version of A Wrinkle in Time at Washington, D.C.'s Arena Stage.

== Theatre work ==
Year	Work	Role	Type	Ref
2016	Caught	Director	Off-Broadway	
2017	Bull in a China Shop	Director	Off-Broadway	
2017	The Winter's Tale	Director	Off-Broadway	
2018	[PORTO]	Director	Off-Broadway	
2018	Dance Nation	Director, Choreographer	Off-Broadway	
2019	The Courtroom	Director	Off-Broadway	
2019	In the Green	Director	Off-Broadway	
2019	Sunday	Director, Choreographer	Off-Broadway	
2020	Riddle of the Trilobites	Director	Off-Broadway	
2020	Oratorio For Living Things	Director	Off-Broadway	
2023	Food	Co-director		
2023	A Good Day to Me Not to You	Director		
2024	Munich Medea	Director		
2024	Safety Not Guaranteed	Director	Off-Broadway	
2025	Oratorio For Living Things	Director	Off-Broadway	
2025	A Wrinkle in Time	Director	Off-Broadway	

== Awards ==
- Obie Award, A Beautiful Day in November on the Banks of the Greatest Lakes (2015)
- Susan Stroman Directing Award, Vineyard Theatre (2016)
- SDC Breakout Award (2017)
- Obie Award, Oratorio for Living Things (2025)
