= Max Wolf Friedlich =

American writer

- Born: Manhattan, New York, U.S.
- Occupation: Playwright
- Known for: Job

Max Wolf Friedlich is an American writer. He is best known for writing the Broadway play Job.

== Early life and education ==
Born and raised in Manhattan, he is the son of businessman Jim Friedlich and artist Melissa Stern. He attended Friends Seminary school and became interested in theatre after being cast as Rumpelstiltskin in a youth production of Once Upon a Pandora’s Box. He student directed a production of A Midsummer Nights Dream and participated in additional youth theatre shows. After learning about the New York Fringe Festival, he wrote and submitted his first play in 2017, titled Sleepover, which was chosen for the festival and staged at the Cherry Lane Theatre. Friedlich went to Wayfinder Adventures, LARP camp in Kingston, New York, and in his high school years studied at Vassar College after being accepted into their Powerhouse Theater Apprentice Program. Friedlich also was accepted into the Young Playwrights program that was founded by Stephen Sondheim in 1981. He is a graduate of Wesleyan University.

== Career ==
After college, he moved to Los Angeles to pursue a career writing for television and film. He was hired to write for various social media enterprises, including creating artificial intelligence for the character Miquela. In 2019, Friedlich studied under IAMA Theatre Company's Under 30 Playwrights Lab. Eventually he decided to move back to New York City and pursue his interest in writing for the theatre. He has performed at the Brooklyn Comedy Collective.

His play Job premiered at the Soho Playhouse Off-Broadway in 2023 to critical acclaim, transferring to the Connelly Theatre for an extended run. The show is set to transfer to Broadway at the Helen Hayes Theatre, marking Friedlich's Broadway debut as a playwright.

In 2022, his short film Driving Forces was released, which he wrote and directed.

== Works ==
- Sleepover (2012) - New York Fringe Festival premiere
- Black Ice (2016)
- Manger (2018) - G45 Productions
- Job (2024)
- The Holes (2025)

== Awards and nominations ==
Year	Award	Category	Work	Result	Ref.
2025	Outer Critics Circle Award	John Gassner Award	Job	Nominated	
