= Jason Hirschhorn =

- Born: New York, New York
- Education: NYU
- Occupations: Media executive and entrepreneur
- Years active: 1995 – Present
- Employer: REDEF (CEO)
- Board member of: Pandora; Chair, Digital Advisory Group, Sundance Institute
- Website: redef.com

Jason Hirschhorn is an American media executive and entrepreneur. He has served as Chief Digital Officer of MTV networks, President of Sling Media, and co-president of MySpace. He is currently the CEO of REDEF, a digital content curation company, and its chief curator.

== Early life and education ==
Jason Hirschhorn was raised by a single parent, his mother, who he credits with his love for music, television, and reading. She clipped articles from newspapers for him to read as a child.

When he was 15 and still in high school, he earned money as a nightclub promoter in New York City. Hirschhorn attended NYU Stern School of Business. During this time he worked remotely as an intern for Warner Bros. Records, designing their first website. He graduated in 1995 with a B.S. in International Business and Marketing.

== Career ==
In 1996 he created a network of music websites, which he ran from his apartment: RockOnTV, Music Newswire, and ShowBizWire, which he called Mischief New Media. After the sites had gained popularity online, Hirschhorn was approached by Sony, Warner Music, and BMG. After consulting with an attorney, he sold the company to Viacom, which owned MTV, in 2000 when he was 28 years old. While working for MTV, Hirschhorn helped launch MTV Overdrive. By 2005, he was leading all of MTV Network's digital properties.

While at MTV, Hirschhorn began sending a list of articles to MTV and Viacom executives in order to share insights on the growing digital industry. The emails became a regular occurrence, and he eventually began inviting people from outside the company to join his email list. Readers ended up forwarding the emails on to others that included Rupert Murdoch and Barry Diller, who later subscribed themselves. The newsletter of articles became formalized with the name "MediaREDEF." Topics included technology, trends, media, and pop culture.

Also in 2005, Hirschhorn attended the Consumer Electronics Show (CES). There he met Blake Krikorian, an entrepreneur who was showing a new device called Slingbox. The device allowed users to stream cable television to other devices by connecting to their home cable box. He ended up leaving MTV for Sling Media as President of Sling Entertainment in 2006. To promote the product, Hirschhorn sent the box to 800 people in the television industry along with Geek Squad contact information for installation. Former naysayers of the product expressed positive opinions after using the device to watch shows on their laptops while traveling. In 2007, Sling Media was sold to Echostar, the satellite television company, for $380 million. Following the sale, Hirschhorn took time away from working in order to travel.

In 2009, Hirschhorn was offered a position at MySpace as co-president and Chief Product Officer by Ruper Murdoch and his team. He left after one year due to MySpace's drop in popularity. Following his exit, he took another three years off to travel.

In 2013, Hirschhorn's mother was diagnosed with cancer. He marked this as a turning point in his career. He reflected on his mother's practice of clipping news articles for him and decided to make it his career before she died. In 2014, he raised funding to launch Media REDEF into its own business, called REDEF, and created a website, a mobile app, and multiple channels named for their types of content, such as MediaREDEF and FashionREDEF.

Hirschhorn joined the board at Pandora in 2017 following the exit of former CEO Tim Westergren.

== Personal life ==
In 2015, Hirschhorn announced he would be taking time away from REDEF due to surgery related to heart disease. The website continued to operate in his absence. He later revealed that the surgery was a quadruple bypass, after which he suffered complications his doctors weren't able to fix. According to Vox, readers directed Hirschhorn to the doctor who he credited with saving his life.
