= Melissa Stern =

American artist

Melissa Stern is an American artist and journalist. Her drawing and sculpture have been exhibited in museums, galleries, private and corporate collections throughout the world. Her art reviews and cultural commentary have been featured in Hyperallergic, the Brooklyn-based digital arts publication. She serves as Art Editor for Posit, a journal of literature and art.

== Early life and education ==
Stern was raised in Philadelphia. She resides in New York City and Shokan, New York. She received her Bachelor of Arts with Honors in Anthropology from Wesleyan University.

== Work ==
Stern does both sculpture and drawings, and uses a wide range of materials including encaustic, clay, pastel, and steel. Her sculptural work includes found objects, souvenirs, vintage magazines and books as well as fabricated images and sculpture.

Stern's work draws from a wide variety of artists, including Marisol Escobar, Max Beckmann, and Jean-Michel Basquiat, and is influenced by Pan-African ethnographic objects.

Stern's work was featured in a solo show at Station Independent Projects on New York’s Lower East Side in March 2017. Her multi-media installation project, The Talking Cure, has been touring the U.S. since 2012, featured at the Akron Art Museum, Real Art Ways (Hartford), Redux Contemporary Art Center (Charleston, SC), and the Weisman Art Museum (Minneapolis). The work has been featured on National Public Radio (NPR) and in The Wall Street Journal and ArtNews, and was a featured presentation of the Spoleto Festival in Charleston, South Carolina. The project is currently on exhibit at the Weisman Art Museum where it will reside until April 2017.

Major solo and group exhibitions include the following: Cognitive Dissonance at the Spartanburg Art Museum in 2016; Psyched at Central Booking Gallery in 2014; Compulsive Narratives at the Rutgers University in 2014; New Math – Drawings at the Fetherston Gallery in 2011; Life During Wartime – Heads at the Barbara Archer Gallery in 2011; Step Right Up at Bahdeebahdu Gallery in 2009; Confrontational Ceramics, curated by Judith Schwartz at the Westchester Arts Council in 2008; Forms of Opulence at the Allen Gallery in 2007; Have a Seat! from the Beylerian Collection of Small Chairs at The Museum of Arts & Design in 2007; The Inner Child at the Hunterdon Art Museum in 2007; Loose Lips -Drawing Exhibition at Zilkha Gallery at Wesleyan University in 2006; Birdland at David Lusk Gallery in 2006; 3rd World Ceramics Biennale’s Ceramics: The Vehicle of Culture, Invitational Exhibition in Icheon, Korea in 2005; Vacation at Spike Gallery in 2003; Pulp Fiction at Bahdeebahdu Gallery in 2003; Back to School at The Children’s Museum of the Arts in New York in 2002; and Third Grade at John Elder Gallery in 2001.

=== Collections ===
Stern’s work is included in several private and public collections, including The Museum of Art and Design in NYC, The International Center for Collage, The Library of Congress, rare book collection, Arkansas Arts Center, Stavanger Museum in Stavanger, Norway, The Arario Gallery, Seoul, Korea, the Davison Collection at Wesleyan University, and the corporate collections of The Kohler Company, News Corporation, and JPMorgan Chase.

Her work has been reviewed in ARTnews, The Wall Street Journal, The Hartford Courant, The Chicago Tribune, The Memphis Commercial Appeal, and NY Arts. She has been interviewed by Vasari21 and Brainard Carey for Yale University Radio.

=== Awards ===
Stern was awarded Artist Residency at the Benyamini Contemporary Ceramics Center Art in Tel Aviv, Israel in 2014; awarded Artist Residency at The Washington Glass School in Washington, DC in 2011; awarded Artist Residency at The Serenbe Institute for Arts, Culture and the Environment, Serenbe GA in 2007; Sponsor’s Award from the R&F Handmade Paint Juried Exhibition in 2001; and the Kohler Foundation Grant for an Artist-in-Residence at the Kohler Company in Sheboygan, WI in 1998 and 2000.
