= Doug Lebda =

American financial services executive (1970–2025)

- Born: January 29, 1970; Lewisburg, Pennsylvania, U.S.
- Died: October 12, 2025 (aged 55); Mill Spring, North Carolina, U.S.
- Years active: 1996–2025
- Known for: Founder of fintech company LendingTree
- Spouse: Tara Garrity (m. 1996–2012) Megan Lebda
- Children: 3

Douglas Lebda (January 29, 1970 – October 12, 2025) was an American financial services executive who was the founder and CEO of fintech company LendingTree. Lebda started LendingTree after a frustrating experience applying for a mortgage. Lebda continued to be involved in the company throughout ownership changes and the "burst" of the dot-com bubble.

== Biography ==
Lebda was born on January 29, 1970, in Lewisburg, Pennsylvania, where he subsequently grew up. While attending Lewisburg High School, Lebda began multiple business ventures, one of which involved reselling collected golf balls from the nearby Bucknell University golf course. He studied accounting and business administration at Bucknell, graduating in 1992.

Lebda worked for PricewaterhouseCoopers in Pittsburgh in the 1990s, and enrolled at the University of Virginia Darden School of Business to study for a Master of Business Administration degree. While at Darden, Lebda first conceived the company that would become LendingTree.

Lebda applied for a mortgage in 1994, and found the process frustrating, even with his background in finance. He left business school to start a mortgage marketing service in 1996. The company, initially named Credit Source USA, advertised mortgage rates to prospective customers and connected them to banks who issued the loans. Lebda moved to Charlotte, North Carolina in 1997, where the company eventually expanded its business to include connecting borrowers with lenders on personal loans and credit cards, changed its name to LendingTree and launched nationwide in 1998. LendingTree issued its initial public offering in 2000, at the height of the dot-com bubble.

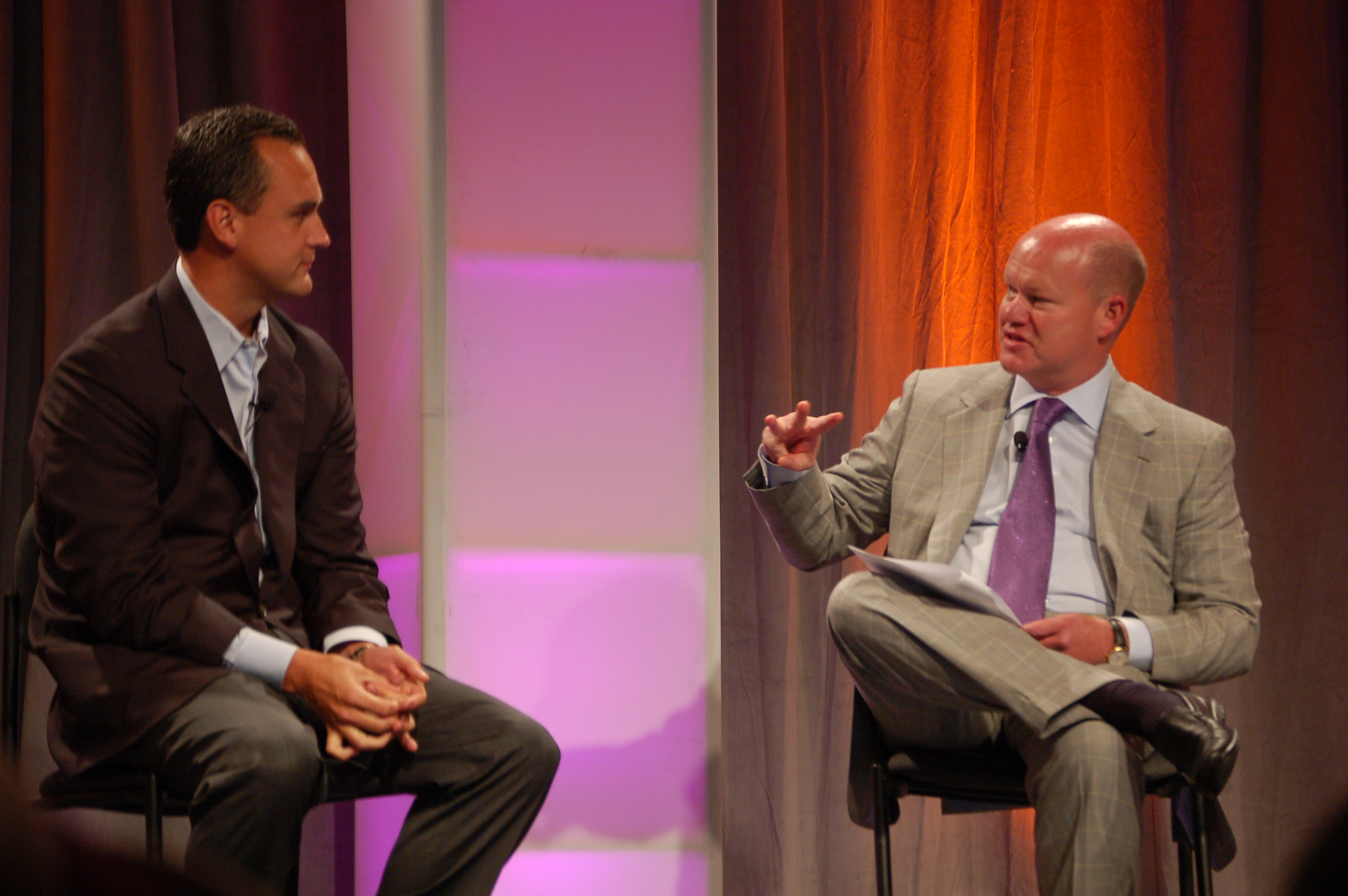
Lebda (left) speaks with Brad Inman at a 2005 conference

The company survived the "burst" of the dot-com bubble shortly after its initial public offering, and Lebda sold the company to media company InterActiveCorp (IAC) in 2003. From 2005 to 2008, he was the president and chief operating officer of IAC. In 2008, he joined Tree.com, which was spun out from IAC as a separate public company. It was later rebranded as LendingTree.

In 2010, Lebda co-founded Tykoon, a financial-services platform for children and families. He returned to Darden in the early 2010s to complete his studies, and graduated from Darden's Executive MBA program in 2014.

In 2019, Lebda bought an ownership stake in the Pittsburgh Steelers that was previously held by David Tepper.

Lebda was the co-chairman of the host committee for the 2020 Republican National Convention.

In 2020, he began a fundraising effort for a community-wide fund to help residents affected by the COVID-19 pandemic, with LendingTree giving $1 million. In 2021, LendingTree was one of the private donors that helped The Foundation for the Carolinas exceed its fundraising goal to support Charlotte's arts budget plan.

Lebda died in an all-terrain vehicle accident on a family property in Mill Spring, North Carolina, on October 12, 2025, at the age of 55.

== Personal life ==
Lebda was first married to Tara Garrity, with whom he had three children: Rachel, Abby, and Sophia, and was married to Megan Greuling at the time of his death.
