= L. Gordon Crovitz =

American journalist

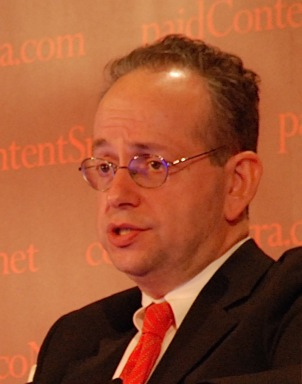
Crovitz in 2017

Louis Gordon Crovitz is an American media executive and advisor to media and technology companies. He is a former publisher of The Wall Street Journal who also served as executive vice-president of Dow Jones and launched the company's Consumer Media Group, which under his leadership integrated the global print, online, digital, TV and other editions of The Wall Street Journal, MarketWatch.com and Barron's across news, advertising, marketing and other functions. He stepped down from those positions in December 2007, when News Corp. completed its acquisition of Dow Jones. He writes a weekly column in The Wall Street Journal, titled "Information Age."

== Biography ==
Crovitz is a Phi Beta Kappa graduate of the University of Chicago. He received a law degree as a Rhodes Scholar from Wadham College of Oxford University and later a Juris Doctor degree from Yale Law School.

In 1981, he started working as an editorial writer for The Wall Street Journal. The following year he became the founding editorial page editor for The Wall Street Journal Europe, based in Brussels. In 1986 he was appointed to The Wall Street Journal's editorial board. He earned a Gerald Loeb Award Honorable Mention for Commentary and the 1990 Gerald Loeb Award for Commentary. In 1992 he became the publisher for the Dow Jones's Far Eastern Economic Review in Hong Kong and in 1996 was named the managing director for Dow Jones Telerate's Asia/Pacific region as well as chairman of Dow Jones in Asia. In 1997-98 he was named vice president of planning and development for Dow Jones.

Since leaving Dow Jones, he has co-founded and sold a start-up technology company and has become a director and advisor to several companies, including technology-based media companies. He is a co-founder of Journalism Online, whose Press+ service enables news publishers to generate subscription revenues for their content on web sites and through tablets, e-readers and mobile devices. Journalism Online, founded in 2009, was sold to RR Donnelley in 2011 for a reported $45 million. Google had launched a product in 2011 to compete with Press+, called Google One Pass, but shut the service down in April, 2012, with Press+ agreeing to grandfather its former customers. Crovitz was an early investor in Business Insider.

While at Dow Jones, he led the redesign of The Wall Street Journal in January 2007, repositioning the print edition to focus on "what the news means," with the web edition addressing "what's happening right now," with the aim of rethinking what a newspaper should be in the Digital Age. He turned around the financial performance of the Journal to become strongly profitable after earlier losing money. He also led the creation of the online news service Factiva, which he chaired for several years, and initiated the acquisition of publicly traded MarketWatch as well as specialist services Private Equity Analyst, VentureOne and VentureWire, London-based news franchise eFinancial News and Frankfurt-based newswire VWD. He oversaw the growth of The Wall Street Journal Online to the world's largest paid subscription news web site, with over one million paying subscribers at the end of 2007. Earlier in his career at Dow Jones, he served as the corporate vice president for planning and strategy; in 1998, he helped sell the Telerate division and helped craft a three-year plan for the company focused on growing Internet revenues. He was editor and publisher of the Far Eastern Economic Review in Hong Kong, doubling revenues and aged 22 years, was founding editorial page editor of the Wall Street Journal Europe in Brussels.

In March 2018, Gordon Crovitz and Steven Brill, partnered to form a new for-profit company, NewsGuard, which claims to fight "fake news" by providing reliability ratings for over 7,500 U.S. websites to help online readers distinguish between legitimate news sources and those allegedly designed to spread misinformation. NewsGuard was launched on August 23, 2018.

He married Anne Alstott (a professor at Yale Law School) on December 7, 1986. He is married to Minky Worden, media director for Human Rights Watch; they have three sons.

Crovitz has written many controversial editorials. In July 2012, he argued that Xerox-Parc's development of the Ethernet protocol meant that the private sector, not the government, created the Internet. Crovitz cited a book by Michael Hiltzik to support this argument but Hiltzik himself rebutted the claim. Crovitz's claims were also rejected as "revisionist" by Vint Cerf, co-inventor of the TCP/IP networking protocols that laid the foundations for the modern internet.
