= Kimberly Akimbo (musical) =

2021 musical by Jeanine Tesori and David Lindsay-Abaire

- Broadway promotional poster
- Music: Jeanine Tesori
- Lyrics: David Lindsay-Abaire
- Book: David Lindsay-Abaire
- Basis: Kimberly Akimbo by David Lindsay-Abaire
- Premiere: November 6, 2021: Linda Gross Theater
- Productions: 2021 Off-Broadway; 2022 Broadway; 2024 North American Tour; 2025 Australian Tour; 2025 Canadian Productions; 2026 Off-West End
- Awards: Tony Award for Best Musical; Tony Award for Best Book of a Musical; Tony Award for Best Original Score

Kimberly Akimbo is a musical with music by Jeanine Tesori and lyrics and book by David Lindsay-Abaire. It is based on Lindsay-Abaire's 2001 play of the same name.

The show tells the story of a lonely teenage girl, Kimberly Levaco, who suffers from a condition similar to progeria that causes her to age rapidly, thereby giving her the appearance of an elderly woman. According to Playbill, Kimberly is "[f]orced to maneuver family secrets, borderline personalities, and possible felony charges, Kim is determined to find happiness in a world where not even time is on her side."

The show premiered off-Broadway on December 8, 2021, at the Linda Gross Theater in Manhattan; it was critically acclaimed, with the performances of Victoria Clark, Justin Cooley, and Bonnie Milligan, Lindsay-Abaire's book and lyrics, and Tesori's score all receiving praise. The off-Broadway production won Best Musical prizes at the Drama Desk, Lucille Lortel, and Outer Critics Circle Awards.

The show then moved to Broadway, opening at the Booth Theatre on November 9, 2022 (with previews beginning on October 12). The Broadway production also received critical acclaim and won five Tony Awards: Best Musical, Best Book of a Musical, Best Original Score, Best Leading Actress in a Musical (Victoria Clark), and Best Featured Actress in a Musical (Bonnie Milligan).

== Background ==
Playwright David Lindsay-Abaire's comedy Kimberly Akimbo premiered in 2001, at the South Coast Repertory in Costa Mesa, California; it eventually moved off-Broadway in 2003, at the Manhattan Theatre Club, in a production featuring Marylouise Burke, John Gallagher, Jr., and Ana Gasteyer.

Lindsay-Abaire's other plays include Fuddy Meers (1999), Good People (2011), and Rabbit Hole (2006), for which he won the 2007 Pulitzer Prize for Drama. Jeanine Tesori has written the music for stage musicals such as Thoroughly Modern Millie (2000), Caroline, or Change (2003), Shrek the Musical (2008), and Fun Home (2013); she has also been twice nominated for the Pulitzer Prize for Drama, for Fun Home and Soft Power (2018). Lindsay-Abaire and Tesori had previously worked together on Shrek the Musical.

== Synopsis ==
=== Act l ===
At an ice skating rink named "Skater Planet" in Bergen County, New Jersey, six teenagers – Kimberly Levaco, Seth Weetis, Martin Doaty, Aaron Puckett, Teresa Benton, and Delia McDaniels – express their frustrations. Kim is the new girl in town, with a disease that makes her age four and a half times as fast as normal, and a dream of visiting Six Flags Great Adventure. Seth, an employee at the rink, feels like a misfit. The four others are all pining for another member of their friend group unrequitedly (Martin for Aaron, Aaron for Delia, Delia for Teresa, and Teresa for Martin). All the teens feel as if they don't fit in, and express their desire to "be seen" ("Skater Planet"). Kim’s frequently drunk father Buddy is over three hours late picking her up; Kimberly gives him a thermos filled with coffee to sober up. Seth comes back to the rink for his tuba, which he had left inside. He asks Kim to be his partner for an upcoming biology project, and says that they could do it about her disease. Buddy retorts and says that Kimberly is researching glaucoma, and insults Seth behind his back. Buddy tells Kimberly to tell her mother, Pattie, that they were late due to car troubles. At the Levacos’ home, Pattie, pregnant and with casts on both arms, creates a video for her yet-to-be-born baby ("Hello, Darling"). When Buddy and Kim arrive home, Pattie chastises Buddy for their lateness and his drunkenness, which leads to an argument in which both parents end up having to give quarters to the family "swear jar". Buddy suggests that if they save up enough in the swear jar, they could go on a road trip, which Pattie quickly shoots down. It is also established that the family is trying to keep secret the fact that they're from Lodi, New Jersey. In her room, Kimberly writes a letter to the Make A Wish Foundation, requesting a treehouse after going back and forth between an array of wishes ("Make A Wish").

At school, Martin, Aaron, Delia, and Teresa make plans for a Dreamgirls medley for their school show choir, one that will compete with their rival West Orange's Evita medley. They reaffirm their problems with unrequited love ("Skater Planet (reprise #1)"). The group then plans on purchasing classic show choir outfits (blue dresses for the girls and turquoise suits for the boys). Kimberly agrees to be Seth's partner for the biology project, and to use her disease as their topic. Delia invites Teresa to Skater Planet, but Teresa wants to invite Martin. This results in all four members of the friend group agreeing to go to Skater Planet, after Martin invites Aaron. In the library, while studying for their project, Seth creates an anagram of Kim's name, "Cleverly Akimbo". She realizes that she likes him ("Anagram"). Debra, Kim's criminal aunt, shows up and makes crude jokes. She reveals that she has been sleeping in the school library, waiting to find Kimberly. The Levaco family moved from Lodi in a manner that made it difficult for Debra to find them, which was intentional. Debra tells Kim about an exciting new opportunity to make a lot of money, and that it is only "slightly illegal". Debra also tries to convince Martin, Aaron, Delia, and Teresa to help out ("Better"). Kim agrees, but only if she gets a say in the plan, and only if Debra agrees that nobody will get hurt. Debra is ecstatic, and tells Kimberly to leave the window and door unlocked at her house.

Around midnight, at the house, Kim goes to unlock the door, but is caught by Pattie, who is awake because of the baby's kicking. Kimberly distracts her, as Debra sneaks in the window. Kim tells her mother that she reminds her of Medea. However, despite Kim's distraction efforts, Pattie catches Debra. Ignoring Pattie's protests, Debra comes into the house, and drags a mailbox into the basement. Pattie reflects on and laments her situation, before singing a lullaby that she used to sing for Kim to the new baby ("Hello, Darling (reprise)/Father Time"). At this point, it is Kim's sixteenth birthday. The life expectancy of one with her disease is sixteen years old. The next morning, Buddy is driving Kim and Seth to school, but embarrasses Kim by yelling at Seth for supposedly wanting to "get in her [Kimberly's] pants". He also throws Seth's muffin out of the car window ("Happy For Her"). Kimberly yells at her father, and tells him that she hopes he crashes the car into a tree and dies. Later, at school, Seth tells Kim that if she wanted him to kiss her, he'd do it. He also invites Kim to come to Skater Planet that night, which she agrees to. Kim reflects on her feelings for Seth ("Anagram (reprise)"). That night, at Skater Planet, Seth gives Kimberly a present of a book of anagrams. Pattie, Debra, and Buddy all show up as well, having been invited by Seth, who reveals to Kim that this is a surprise birthday party. Debra gifts Kim an extremely large pinecone, while Buddy and Pattie both promise to, respectively, stop drinking and be a better mother as their presents. Martin, Aaron, Delia, and Teresa arrive, also having been invited to the party. Delia informs the group that they won't be able to get their costumes, because the show choir has run out of money. Hearing this, Debra ropes them into her plan once more. Everybody hopes for the future ("This Time").

=== Act II ===
In Kim’s basement, Debra is teaching the six teenagers how to wash a check. It proves too complex for them, with Aaron getting his arm stuck in the mailbox (from which they are retrieving the checks), and Teresa getting a glue trap stuck to her head (which they are using to fish out the checks). However, once Debra compares them unfavorably to West Orange, they complete the task without trouble (“How to Wash a Check”). After the rest of the group is gone, Seth stands alone and reflects on how all his life he was the "good kid" and now he is involved in a check fraud scheme, before deciding "maybe a little bad could do a lot of good." ("Good Kid")

At the Levaco home, Buddy is trying to distract himself, since he is not drinking, through an exercise plan he and Kim came up with. When Pattie, now with a leg brace from a skating injury at Kimberly’s birthday party, leaves her camera in the room, he makes a video for the baby. He reflects on the future that he lost when Pattie got pregnant with Kim, and tells the baby to “see the world” (“Hello, Baby”). At school, the six teens are in the library, playing UNO, just before their biology class (and their biology presentations). Seth asks about what will happen if they get caught, and all of them think about what the future holds (“Skater Planet (reprise #2)”). In class, the group does their presentations. Aaron and Martin present scurvy, Delia and Teresa present fasciolosis, and Kim and Seth present her disease. During the presentation, Kimberly gets upset, thinking about how getting older is her affliction, but getting older is the rest of the class’s cure (for adolescence). She runs out of the class (“Our Disease”).

When Kim arrives at home, she finds that Buddy has cooked a meal for everybody, and they sit down for a family dinner. However, resentment soon boils over, and they begin to fight. It is revealed that Buddy paid Debra to go to the Levaco’s old neighbor, Mr. Zwicky’s house to beat him up, because Pattie had sex with him to ensure that this baby wouldn’t have the same ailment as Kim. Zwicky died of a fear-induced heart attack during the assault, resulting in the family leaving Lodi. They fight, until Kimberly collapses to the floor (“The Inevitable Turn”). Three days later, at the hospital, Kim is bedridden and asleep. Debra convinces Buddy and Pattie to leave and go home, so they can sleep and take showers. Before they leave, Pattie tells Kim (who is pretending to sleep) that the Make A Wish Foundation is going to build her a treehouse. Seth shows up, while Debra takes off to find a bedpan and pills. Seth has brought all sorts of things to help Kim feel better, but she just wants to live in a better moment and they decide to leave to participate in the check fraud scheme, which was to be done without them (“Now”).

Debra reminds the group of their plan (“How to Wash a Check (reprise)”). She also reveals the kids' crushes on one another. Kim emerges from the back room disguised as a grandmother, which is a part of the plan. She demands that Martin, Aaron, Delia, Teresa, and Seth not come along, but Seth insists (he is also the one driving). They go. Later, Kim comes home with a bag of the money and tells her parents that they can finally go on their road trip, and to start packing. She then goes into her room, and sees that they have replaced her bed with a crib for the new baby. They fight, and she tells her parents to give up who they wanted her to be before she dies. She writes a new letter to Make A Wish, telling them thank you for the treehouse, but that she doesn’t need it because she is going to see the world (“Before I Go”).

Kimberly and Seth are in Buddy’s car, at Six Flags Great Adventure. They are on a road trip, with the camera and their portion of the money–as well as Debra’s money, which they stole. Kim makes a video for her sister and asks Seth to make sure she gets it (“Hello, Sister”). They kiss.

Martin, Aaron, Delia, and Teresa (in their show choir outfits), Debra (now working at Costco), Pattie and Buddy (with the new baby), and Kim and Seth tell the audience to live life to the fullest because "no one gets a second time around" (“Great Adventure”).

== Productions ==
=== Off-Broadway (2021) ===
Kimberly Akimbo's original production ran off-Broadway from December 8, 2021 to January 15, 2022 (with previews beginning on November 6), at the Linda Gross Theater in Manhattan, produced by the Atlantic Theater Company. Directed by Jessica Stone, its cast included Tony Award-winner Victoria Clark, Tony nominee Steven Boyer, Alli Mauzey, and Justin Cooley. Set design was by David Zinn; costume design was by Sarah Laux; lighting design was by Lap Chi Chu; sound design was by Kai Harada; choreography was by Danny Mefford; and orchestrations were by John Clancy, with additional musical arrangements by Macy Schmidt.

=== Broadway (2022–2024) ===
The show then moved to Broadway's Booth Theatre with the same cast, beginning previews on October 12, 2022 with an official opening on November 10, 2022. It was produced by David Stone, the Atlantic Theater Company, James L. Nederlander, LaChanze, John Gore, Patrick Catullo and Aaron Glick. For this production, the entire creative team remained except for Chu's lighting, who was replaced by Jeanette Oi-Suk Yew. The show received rave reviews from the critics. The show received eight 2023 Tony Award nominations, winning for best musical, book, score, leading actress, and supporting actress. The production played its final performance on April 28, 2024, having played 32 previews and 612 regular performances.

=== North American Tour (2024) ===
A 60-city North American national tour launched in September 2024 at the Denver Center for the Performing Arts. Carolee Carmello played the title character until July 2025, when she was replaced by Ann Morrison.

=== Australian Tour (2025) ===
The first Australian production, by State Theatre Company of South Australia and Melbourne Theatre Company, played at Adelaide's Her Majesty's Theatre and then The Playhouse within the Arts Centre Melbourne from July 8, 2025 to August 30, 2025, starring Marina Prior and Casey Donovan.

=== Canadian productions (2025–2026) ===
The first Canadian production at the Segal Centre for Performing Arts, played from November 23 to December 21, 2025. The musical then transferred to the CAA Theatre in Toronto between January 14 and February 8, 2026. Louise Pitre stars in the title role.

The Arts Club Theatre Company in Vancouver presented a production in April and May 2026.

=== Off West-End (2026) ===
The Hampstead Theatre in London stars Maria Friedman in the title role, with Alice Fearn as Debra, Peter Hannah as Buddy Levaco, Gilli Jones as Seth Weetis, Niamh Perry as Pattie Levaco, Sara Hajizadeh as Teresa Benton, Ronav Jain as Aaron Puckett, Robin Simões da Silva as Martin Doaty and Aviva Tulley as Delia McDaniels. The production is directed by Michael Longhurst, with design by Soutra Gilmour, musical supervision and direction by Nigel Lilley, choreography by Matt Cole, lighting by Jack Knowles and sound by Paul Groothuis. It began previews on 29 August 2026 and closed on 14 November 2026 after a week's extension.

== Musical numbers ==
Act I

- "Skater Planet" - Aaron, Delia, Martin, Teresa, Seth, Kimberly
- "Hello, Darling" - Pattie
- "Make a Wish" - Kimberly
- "Skater Planet (reprise #1)" - Aaron, Delia, Martin, Teresa †
- "Anagram" - Seth, Kimberly, Company
- "Better" - Debra, Kimberly, Company
- "Hello, Darling (reprise)/Father Time" - Pattie
- "Happy For Her" - Buddy
- "Anagram (reprise)" - Kimberly †
- "This Time" - Company

Act II

- "How to Wash a Check" - Debra, Kimberly, Seth, Aaron, Delia, Martin, Teresa
- "Good Kid" - Seth
- "Hello, Baby" - Buddy
- "Skater Planet (reprise #2)" - Aaron, Delia, Martin, Teresa, Seth
- "Our Disease" - Kimberly, Seth, Aaron, Delia, Martin, Teresa
- "The Inevitable Turn" - Pattie, Buddy, Debra, Aaron, Delia, Martin, Teresa
- "Now" - Seth, Kimberly
- "How to Wash a Check (reprise)" - Debra, Aaron, Delia, Martin, Teresa
- "Before I Go" - Kimberly, Buddy, Pattie
- "Hello, Sister" - Kimberly, Seth †
- "Great Adventure" - Company

†=Not on the Broadway Cast Album

== Cast and characters ==
Character	Off-Broadway	Broadway	1st national tour	Australian tour	London
Character	2021	2022	2024	2025	2026
Kimberly Levaco	Victoria Clark	Victoria Clark	Carolee Carmello	Marina Prior	Maria Friedman
Seth Weetis	Justin Cooley	Justin Cooley	Miguel Gil	Darcy Wain	Gilli Jones
Buddy Levaco	Steven Boyer	Steven Boyer	Jim Hogan	Nathan O'Keefe	Peter Hannah
Pattie Levaco	Alli Mauzey	Alli Mauzey	Dana Steingold	Christie Whelan Browne	Niamh Perry
Aunt Debra	Bonnie Milligan	Bonnie Milligan	Emily Koch	Casey Donovan	Alice Fearn
Delia McDaniels	Olivia Elease Hardy	Olivia Elease Hardy	Grace Capeless	Allycia Angeles	Aviva Tulley
Martin Doaty	Fernell Hogan II	Fernell Hogan II	Darron Hayes	Marty Alix	Robin Simões da Silva
Aaron Puckett	Michael Iskander	Michael Iskander	Pierce Wheeler	Jacob Rozario	Ronav Jain
Teresa Benton	Nina White	Nina White	Skye Alyssa Friedman	Alana Iannace	Sara Hajizadeh

== Awards and nominations ==
=== 2021 Off-Broadway production ===
Year	Award	Category	Nominee	Result
2022	Drama Desk Awards	Outstanding Musical		Won
2022	Drama Desk Awards	Outstanding Actress in a Musical	Victoria Clark	Nominated
2022	Drama Desk Awards	Outstanding Featured Actor in a Musical	Justin Cooley	Nominated
2022	Drama Desk Awards	Outstanding Featured Actress in a Musical	Bonnie Milligan	Nominated
2022	Drama Desk Awards	Outstanding Director of a Musical	Jessica Stone	Nominated
2022	Drama Desk Awards	Outstanding Music	Jeanine Tesori	Nominated
2022	Drama Desk Awards	Outstanding Lyrics	David Lindsay-Abaire	Nominated
2022	Drama Desk Awards	Outstanding Scenic Design of a Musical	David Zinn	Nominated
2022	Drama Desk Awards	Outstanding Sound Design in a Musical	Kai Harada	Nominated
2022	Drama League Awards	Outstanding Production of a Musical		Nominated
2022	Drama League Awards	Distinguished Performance	Victoria Clark	Nominated
2022	Drama League Awards	Distinguished Performance	Bonnie Milligan	Nominated
2022	Lucille Lortel Awards	Outstanding Musical		Won
2022	Lucille Lortel Awards	Outstanding Choreographer	Danny Mefford	Nominated
2022	Lucille Lortel Awards	Outstanding Lead Performer in a Musical	Victoria Clark	Won
2022	Lucille Lortel Awards	Outstanding Lead Performer in a Musical	Justin Cooley	Nominated
2022	Lucille Lortel Awards	Outstanding Featured Performer in a Musical	Bonnie Milligan	Won
2022	Lucille Lortel Awards	Outstanding Featured Performer in a Musical	Steven Boyer	Nominated
2022	New York Drama Critics' Circle Awards	Best Musical	Jeanine Tesori, David Lindsay-Abaire	Won
2022	Outer Critics Circle Awards	Outstanding New Off-Broadway Musical		Won
2022	Outer Critics Circle Awards	Outstanding Actor in a Musical	Justin Cooley	Nominated
2022	Outer Critics Circle Awards	Outstanding Actress in a Musical	Victoria Clark	Won
2022	Outer Critics Circle Awards	Outstanding Featured Actress in a Musical	Bonnie Milligan	Nominated
2022	Outer Critics Circle Awards	Outstanding Director of a Musical	Jessica Stone	Won
2022	Outer Critics Circle Awards	Outstanding Book of a Musical	David Lindsay-Abaire	Won
2022	Outer Critics Circle Awards	Outstanding New Score	Jeanine Tesori & David Lindsay-Abaire	Nominated
2022	Outer Critics Circle Awards	Outstanding Orchestrations	John Clancy	Nominated
2022	Theatre World Award		Justin Cooley	Honoree

=== 2022 Broadway production ===
Year	Award	Category	Nominee	Result
2023	Tony Awards	Best Musical		Won
2023	Tony Awards	Best Book of a Musical	David Lindsay-Abaire	Won
2023	Tony Awards	Best Original Score	Jeanine Tesori & David Lindsay-Abaire	Won
2023	Tony Awards	Best Direction of a Musical	Jessica Stone	Nominated
2023	Tony Awards	Best Actress in a Musical	Victoria Clark	Won
2023	Tony Awards	Best Featured Actor in a Musical	Justin Cooley	Nominated
2023	Tony Awards	Best Featured Actress in a Musical	Bonnie Milligan	Won
2023	Tony Awards	Best Orchestrations	John Clancy	Nominated
2023	Dorian Award	Outstanding Broadway Musical		Won
2023	Dorian Award	Outstanding Broadway Ensemble		Won
2023	Dorian Award	Outstanding Lead Performance in a Broadway Musical	Victoria Clark	Won
2023	Dorian Award	Outstanding Featured Performance in a Broadway Musical	Bonnie Milligan	Won
2023	Dorian Award	Broadway Showstopper Award		Nominated
2023	Actor's Equity Foundation Award	Clarence Derwent Award	Bonnie Milligan	Won
2023	Grammy Award	Best Musical Theater Album		Nominated

=== 2025 Australian Tour ===
Year	Award	Category	Nominee	Result
2025	Green Room Awards	Outstanding Production		Nominated
2025	Green Room Awards	Outstanding Artist in A Leading Role	Marina Prior	Nominated
2025	Green Room Awards	Outstanding Artist in A Supporting Role	Darcy Wain	Nominated
2025	Green Room Awards	Outstanding Artist in A Supporting Role	Nathan O'Keefe	Nominated
2025	Green Room Awards	Outstanding Ensemble		Won
2025	Green Room Awards	Outstanding Direction	Mitchell Butel	Nominated
2025	Green Room Awards	The Betty Pounder Award for Outstanding Australian Choreography	Amy Campbell	Nominated
