= The Balusters =

2026 play by David Lindsay-Abaire

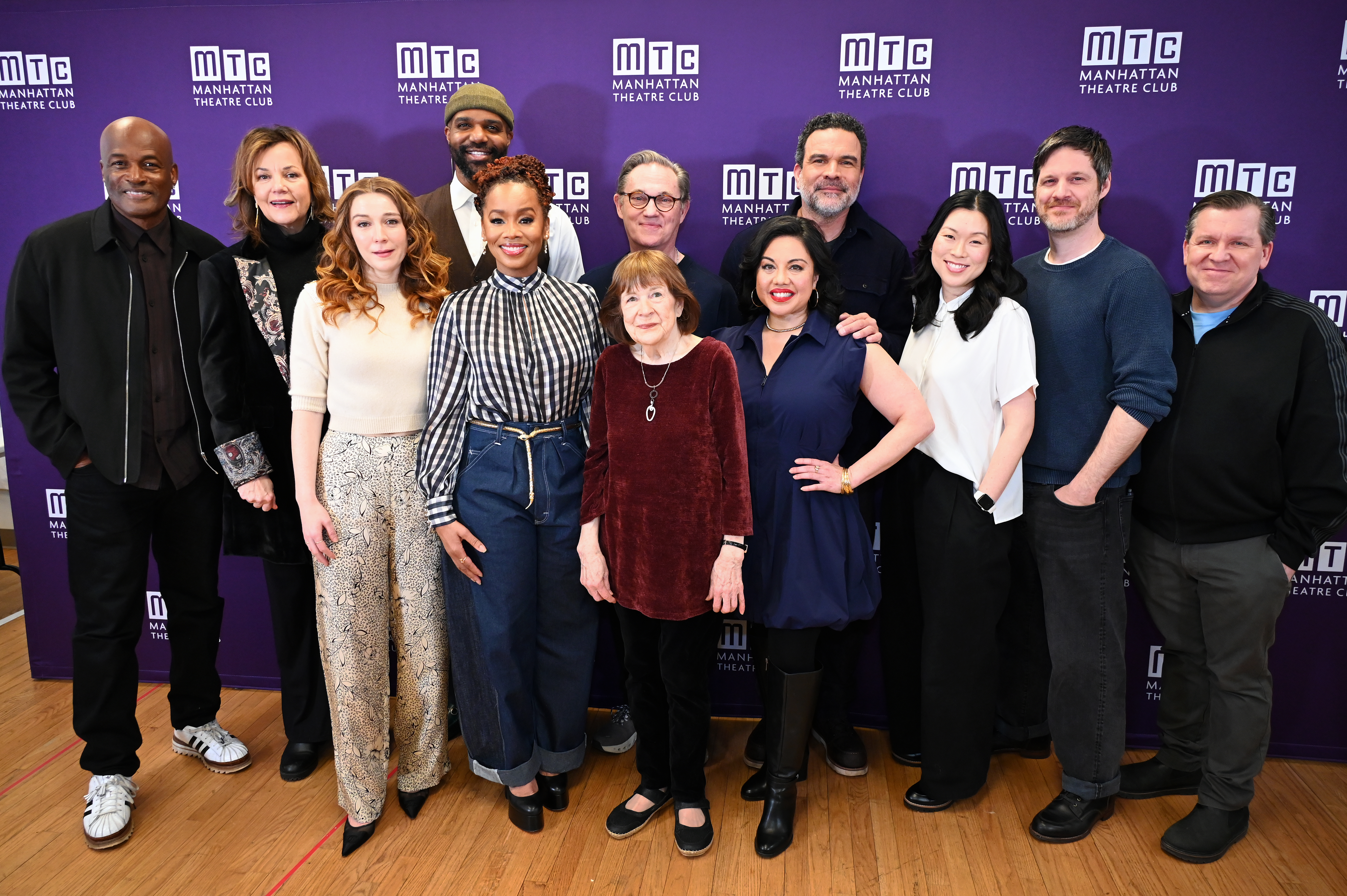
- Original Broadway cast, writer, and director
- Original language: English
- Written by: David Lindsay-Abaire
- Genre: Comedy

Premiere
- Date: 2026
- Place: New York City

The Balusters is a comedy play written by David Lindsay-Abaire and originally produced at Manhattan Theatre Club. It opened on Broadway in March 2026 at the Samuel J. Friedman Theatre, and closed in June 2026. It received 5 Tony Award nominations, including Best Play.

== Plot synopsis ==
When a newcomer to the Vernon Point Neighborhood Association suggests installing a stop sign on a picturesque block, chaos ensues.

== Production history ==
The Balusters was commissioned by Manhattan Theatre Club (MTC) through the Bank of America New Play Program and is a recipient of an Edgerton Foundation New Play Award. It was written by American playwright David Lindsay-Abaire. Lindsay-Abaire has a long history of collaboration with MTC going back to 1999, writing and producing plays such as Rabbit Hole, Ripcord, Fuddy Meers, Kimberly Akimbo, and Wonder of the World.

Preview performances of The Balusters began at the Samuel J. Friedman Theatre on March 31, 2026, with an official opening night on April 21. It is directed by Kenny Leon. The run was extended an additional two weeks, through June 21, 2026.

Set of the 2026 Broadway production of the Balusters at the Samuel J. Friedman Theatre

The set was designed by Derek McLane, costumes were designed by Emilio Sosa, and the sound designer was Dan Moses Schreier. Allen Lee Hughes was the lighting designer. J. Jared Janas designed the hair, wigs, and makeup.

== Critical reception ==
The Balusters was a NYT Critic's Pick. It earned five Tony Award nominations: Best Play, Best Costume Design of a Play (Emilio Sosa), Best Direction of a Play (Kenny Leon), Best Featured Actress (Marylouise Burke), and Best Featured Actor (Richard Thomas).

== Cast and characters ==
Character	Broadway
Character	2026
Penny Bewell	Marylouise Burke
Brooks Duncan	Carl Clemons-Hopkins
Ruth Ackerman	Margaret Colin
Kyra Marshall	Anika Noni Rose
Eliott Emerson	Richard Thomas
Willow Gibbons	Kayli Carter
Isaac Rosario	Ricardo Chavira
Alan Kirby	Michael Esper
Luz Baccay	Maria-Christina Oliveras
Melissa Han	Jeena Yi

== Awards and nominations ==
=== 2026 Broadway production ===
Year	Award	Category	Work	Result	Ref.
2026	Drama League Awards	Outstanding Production of a Play		Nominated	
2026	Drama League Awards	Distinguished Performance	Marylouise Burke	Nominated	
2026	Outer Critics Circle Awards	Outstanding New Broadway Play		Won	
2026	Drama Desk Awards	Outstanding Play		Won	
2026	Drama Desk Awards	Outstanding Lead Performance in a Play	Anika Noni Rose	Nominated	
2026	Drama Desk Awards	Outstanding Featured Performance in a Play	Maria-Christina Oliveras	Nominated	
2026	Drama Desk Awards	Outstanding Featured Performance in a Play	Richard Thomas	Nominated	
2026	Drama Desk Awards	Outstanding Direction of a Play	Kenny Leon	Nominated	
2026	Drama Desk Awards	Outstanding Scenic Design of a Play	Derek McLane	Nominated	
2026	Drama Desk Awards	Outstanding Costume Design of a Play	Emilio Sosa	Nominated	
2026	Drama Desk Awards	Outstanding Fight Choreography	Thomas Schall	Nominated	
2026	Tony Awards	Best Play		Nominated	
2026	Tony Awards	Best Performance by a Featured Actress in a Play	Marylouise Burke	Nominated	
2026	Tony Awards	Best Performance by a Featured Actor in a Play	Richard Thomas	Nominated	
2026	Tony Awards	Best Direction of a Play	Kenny Leon	Nominated	
2026	Tony Awards	Best Costume Design of a Play	Emilio Sosa	Nominated	
2026	Dorian Awards	Outstanding Broadway Play		Won	
2026	Dorian Awards	Outstanding Featured Performance in a Broadway Play	Marylouise Burke	Nominated	
2026	Dorian Awards	Outstanding Broadway Ensemble	Company	Nominated	
2026	Dorian Awards	Outstanding Script of a Broadway Play	David Lindsay-Abaire	Won	
