= Good People (play) =

2011 play by David Lindsay-Abaire

- Opening Night Playbill
- Written by: David Lindsay-Abaire
- Characters: See list
- Original language: English
- Subject: Middle class life in a South Boston neighborhood
- Setting: South Boston

Premiere
- Date premiered: February 8, 2011
- Place premiered: Samuel J. Friedman Theatre, Broadway
- Official website

Good People is a 2011 play by David Lindsay-Abaire. The world premiere was staged by the Manhattan Theatre Club in New York City. At the 65th Tony Awards, the production was nominated for Best Play and Best Lead Actress (Frances McDormand), with the latter winning.

== Synopsis ==
Margie Walsh, a lifelong resident of Southie, a blue collar Boston neighborhood, is fired for tardiness from her job as a cashier at a dollar store. A single mother, and knowing that she and her handicapped adult daughter Joyce, "are only a single paycheck away from desperate straits", Margie goes to her old high school boyfriend Mike — now a doctor, but formerly from her neighborhood — looking for employment. After a verbal game of chicken, Margie shames Mike into inviting her (however reluctantly) to his birthday party in Chestnut Hill. Margie is looking forward to the party because she views it as a chance to meet potential employers. Her friends, Dottie and Jean, encourage her to tell Mike that her daughter Joyce was not born premature but is his, in hopes of getting support from Mike. When Mike calls to tell her that the party has been cancelled, Margie assumes that he is disinviting her because he's embarrassed to have her mix with his bourgeois doctor friends. She decides to go to the house anyway, with the intent of crashing the party.

At the beginning of Act II, Margie arrives at Mike's house only to discover that the party has, in fact, been cancelled. Mike's elegant young African American wife Kate at first mistakes Margie for a caterer coming to pick up left-over party paraphernalia. Once the misunderstanding is resolved, Kate invites Margie to stay and reminisce about Mike's past (though Mike is clearly less than enthusiastic at the prospect). A discussion begins, in which Mike tells Margie that her current financial problems are her own fault for not trying hard enough, and Margie tries to explain to Mike that he had lucky breaks that most people from Southie didn't. She talks about the time Mike was beating an African American boy and Mike's father intervened to prevent him from possibly killing the boy and ending up in prison. Then she goes further and tells him that he is Joyce's father, and that she never told the truth about the paternity because she wanted Mike to be able to "get out". Mike says that it wouldn't have made a difference if she'd told him, as he had been planning to leave her anyway. Kate, though she had been taking Margie's side, says to Margie that if Joyce was indeed Mike's, it was selfish of her to hide that fact and not do everything she could for her child. Margie finally claims she was encouraged by her friends to try to extort Mike and it was, indeed, a lie, before finally leaving in shame (though not without implying that Mike is cheating on Kate).

Later, Margie's landlady receives an envelope marked as having Margie's rent inside - thinking it has been sent from Mike, Margie intends to return it to him. At bingo, though, it is revealed that the envelope is from Stevie, her former boss at the dollar store - upon learning this, Margie accepts the money as an indefinite "loan" and Stevie agrees to help her find a new job. In a final twist to the plot, Margie asks Jean how she knew that Joyce was indeed Mike's baby, to which Jean replies that "everybody knows."

== Cast and characters ==
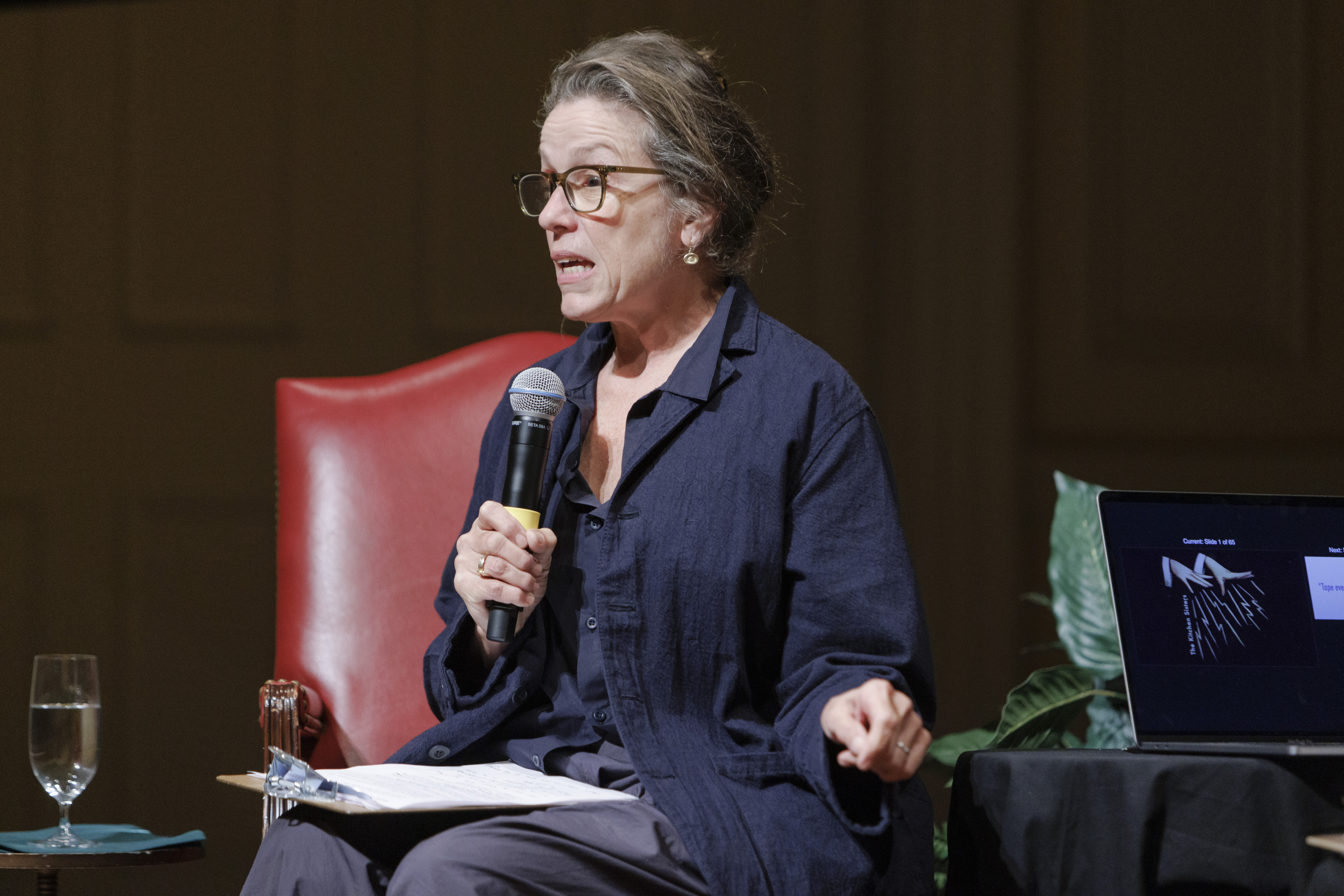
Frances McDormand won the Tony Award for Best Actress in a Play for her role as Margie in the Original Broadway production in 2011.

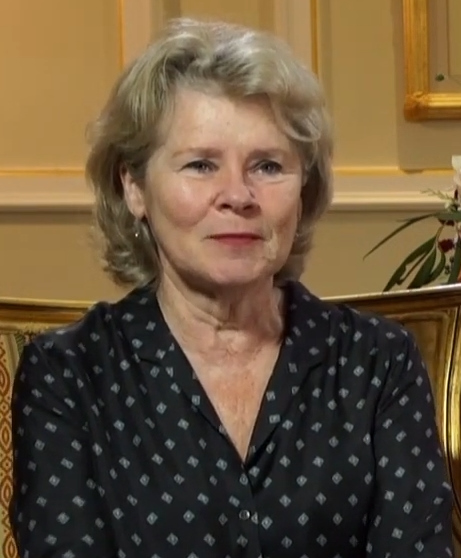
Imelda Staunton was nominated for the Laurence Olivier Award for Best Actress for playing Margie in the West End production in 2014.

- Margie: single mother, fired from her job
- Mike: Margie's old highschool boyfriend
- Dottie: friend of Margie
- Jean: friend of Margie
- Stevie: Margie's former boss
- Kate: Mike's wife

| Character | Broadway | Los Angeles | West End |
| Character | 2011 | 2012 | 2014 |
|---|---|---|---|
| Margie | Frances McDormand | Jane Kaczmarek | Imelda Staunton |
| Mike | Tate Donovan | Jon Tenney | Lloyd Owen |
| Dottie | Estelle Parsons | Marylouise Burke | Susan Brown |
| Jean | Becky Ann Baker | Sara Botsford | Lorraine Ashbourne |
| Stevie | Patrick Carroll | Brad Fleischer | Matthew Barker |
| Kate | Renée Elise Goldsberry | Cherise Boothe | Angel Coulby |
| Ali (v/o) | Emma Rayne Lyle | N/A | N/A |

== Production history ==
=== Broadway debut (2011) ===
The show began previews on Broadway at the Samuel J. Friedman Theatre on February 8, 2011, and opened on March 3. Good People was directed by Daniel J. Sullivan and starred Frances McDormand as Margie and Tate Donovan as Mike. Other cast members were Becky Ann Baker as Jean, Patrick Carroll as Stevie, Estelle Parsons as Dottie, and Renée Elise Goldsberry as Kate. The creative team included sets by John Lee Beatty, costumes by David Zinn, and lighting by Pat Collins. The limited engagement run concluded on May 29, 2011, after 101 regular performances and 27 previews.

=== Regional productions ===
In July 2011, it was announced that the Geffen Playhouse in Los Angeles, California, will produce Good People in April 2012. Cast list below. Steppenwolf Theater in Chicago, Illinois produced play from September 13 through November 17, 2012.

The Repertory Theatre of St. Louis offered a Mainstage production of the play under the direction of Seth Gordon Jan. 2-27, 2013. Forward Theater of Madison, WI presented the play April 4 – 21, 2013 under the direction of Jennifer Uphoff Gray. The English Theatre Frankfurt from May 10 until 6 July 2013. Directed by Michael Howcroft, Designed by Morgan Large and Lit by Richard G Jones. Cast: Janet Greaves as Margie Walsh, Kevin McGowan as Mike, Louise Yates as Jean, Will Close as Stevie, Fiz Marcus as Dottie and Gracy Goldman as Kate. Cleveland Play House presented "Good People" at the Allen Theatre between March 23 and April 14, 2013. The play was directed by Laura Kepley and was co-produced with Syracuse Stage.

The Alley Theatre presents Good People on the Neuhaus Stage from May 30 through June 29, 2014. Artistic Director: Gregory Boyd; Managing Director: Dean R. Gladden. Geva Theatre Center presented Good People as part of the 2014-2015 ESL Wilson Mainstage Season from October 21 - November 16. Artistic Director: Mark Cuddy; Executive Director, Tom Parrish. Cast list below. The Milwaukee Repertory Theater is presenting "Good People" on the Quadracci Powerhouse stage January 20 through February 15, 2015. Directed by Kate Buckley.

Playhouse On The Square is presenting "Good People" August 20 through 23, 2015. Directed by John Woodruff. Scripps Ranch Theatre presenting Good People Jan 27 to Feb 26, 2017 Directed by Eric Poppick

=== International productions ===
Imelda Staunton stars in a production at the Hampstead Theatre in London, which previewed from February 27, opened on March 5 and closes on April 5. This production then transferred to the West End's Noël Coward Theatre where it was produced by Hampstead Theatre, Old Vic Productions and James Quaife Productions. Imelda Staunton received a nomination for the Laurence Olivier Award for Best Actress in a Play.

Buena gente, the Spanish version, opened in Madrid 11 February 2015. The cast included Verónica Forqué as Margarita, Juan Fernández, Pilar Castro, Susi Sánchez and Diego Paris. It was adapted and directed by David Serrano. The Ensemble Theatre at Kirribilli is presenting "Good People" April 7 through May 21. Directed by Mark Kilmurry. Theater Central is presenting "Good People" October 21 through November 5 as a German speaking premiere. Directed by Alec Broennimann. Haifa Theatre in Israel is presenting "Good People" October 18. Directed by Itzik Weingarten. Howick Little Theatre in New Zealand presented "Good People" July 7–28, 2018. Directed by Vic Leilua. Valmiera Drama Theatre in Latvia presented "Good People" from February 12, 2021. Directed by Inese Micule. "Oameni buni", the Romanian version of the play, opened in Bucharest, at the Comedy Theatre, on December 17, 2023. The cast includes Mihaela Teleoacă, Sandu Pop, Laura Creț, Delia Nartea, Silviu Debu, Iasmina Crețoi and Cătălina Mihai. The performance is directed by Andreea Vulpe.

== Critical reception ==
Good People received mostly positive reviews, with Ben Brantley in The New York Times writing:

"Embodied with an ideal balance of expertise and empathy by Frances McDormand, Margie (as her friends call her, using a hard "g") is the not-quite heroine of David Lindsay-Abaire’s "Good People," the very fine new play that opened Thursday night at the Samuel J. Friedman Theater. And discovering how Margie operates — and where she’s coming from — is one of the more subtly surprising treats of this theater season."

The Variety Magazine review noted, "If 'Good People' isn't a hit for Manhattan Theater Club, there is no justice in the land . . . McDormand has an uncanny affinity for women who work hard to make a living and suck it up without complaint." However, Talkin' Broadway's Matthew Murray called the show "no better energizing this inert premise" and called the lead roles "miscast".

Jason Clark, in Slant Magazine, stated, "Only David Lindsay-Abaire could write scenes of downtrodden Southie ... As sensitive a modern playwright as can be heard these days, the setups for the scenes in his grandly entertaining Good People—his best work to date—sound like doomed-to-fail, ivory tower-slanted scenarios: a minimum-wage employee being fired for dismal work, an uneasy meeting of old flames (one of which has a spouse of a different race), the needs of a child with a major disability ... Instead of holding up the play's lead character Margaret (Frances McDormand) as a victim of hard luck, the playwright shrewdly uses her as an example of how choices can make or break us, and the smallest twists of fate determine our path."

In a negative review, Terry Teachout (The Wall Street Journal), wrote, "I doubt it's a coincidence that they are exactly the kinds of people who fit into the familiar sociological narrative that permeates every page of this play. In Mr. Lindsay-Abaire's America, success is purely a matter of luck, and virtue inheres solely in those who are luckless. So what if Mikey worked hard? Why should anybody deserve any credit for working hard? Hence the crude deck-stacking built into the script of Good People, in which Mikey is the callous villain who forgot where he came from and Margie the plucky Southie gal who may be the least little bit racist (though she never says anything nasty to Mikey's wife—that would be going too far!) but is otherwise a perfect heroine-victim."

== Awards and nominations ==
=== 2011 Broadway production ===
| Year | Award | Category | Nominated work | Result | Ref. |
|---|---|---|---|---|---|
| 2011 | Tony Awards | Best Play | David Lindsay-Abaire | Nominated | |
| 2011 | Tony Awards | Best Actress in a Play | Frances McDormand | Won | |
| 2011 | Drama Desk Awards | Outstanding Play | David Lindsay-Abaire | Nominated | |
| 2011 | Drama Desk Awards | Outstanding Actress in a Play | Frances McDormand | Won | |
| 2011 | Drama League Awards | Distinguished Production of a Play | David Lindsay-Abaire | Nominated | |
| 2011 | Drama League Awards | Distinguished Performance | Frances McDormand | Nominated | |
| 2011 | Drama League Awards | Distinguished Performance | Estelle Parsons | Nominated | |
| 2011 | Outer Critics Circle Awards | Outstanding New Broadway Play | David Lindsay-Abaire | Nominated | |
| 2011 | Outer Critics Circle Awards | Outstanding Director of a Play | Daniel J. Sullivan | Nominated | |
| 2011 | Outer Critics Circle Awards | Outstanding Actress in a Play | Frances McDormand | Won | |
| 2011 | Outer Critics Circle Awards | Outstanding Featured Actress in a Play | Estelle Parsons | Nominated | |
| 2011 | Outer Critics Circle Awards | Outstanding Featured Actress in a Play | Renée Elise Goldsberry | Nominated | |
| 2011 | New York Drama Critics' Circle Awards | Best Play of the 2010-2011 Season | David Lindsay-Abaire | Won | |

=== 2015 West End production ===
| Year | Award | Category | Nominated work | Result | Ref. |
|---|---|---|---|---|---|
| 2015 | Laurence Olivier Award | Best Leading Actress in a Play | Imelda Staunton | Nominated | |
