= John Gallagher Jr. =

American actor (born 1984)

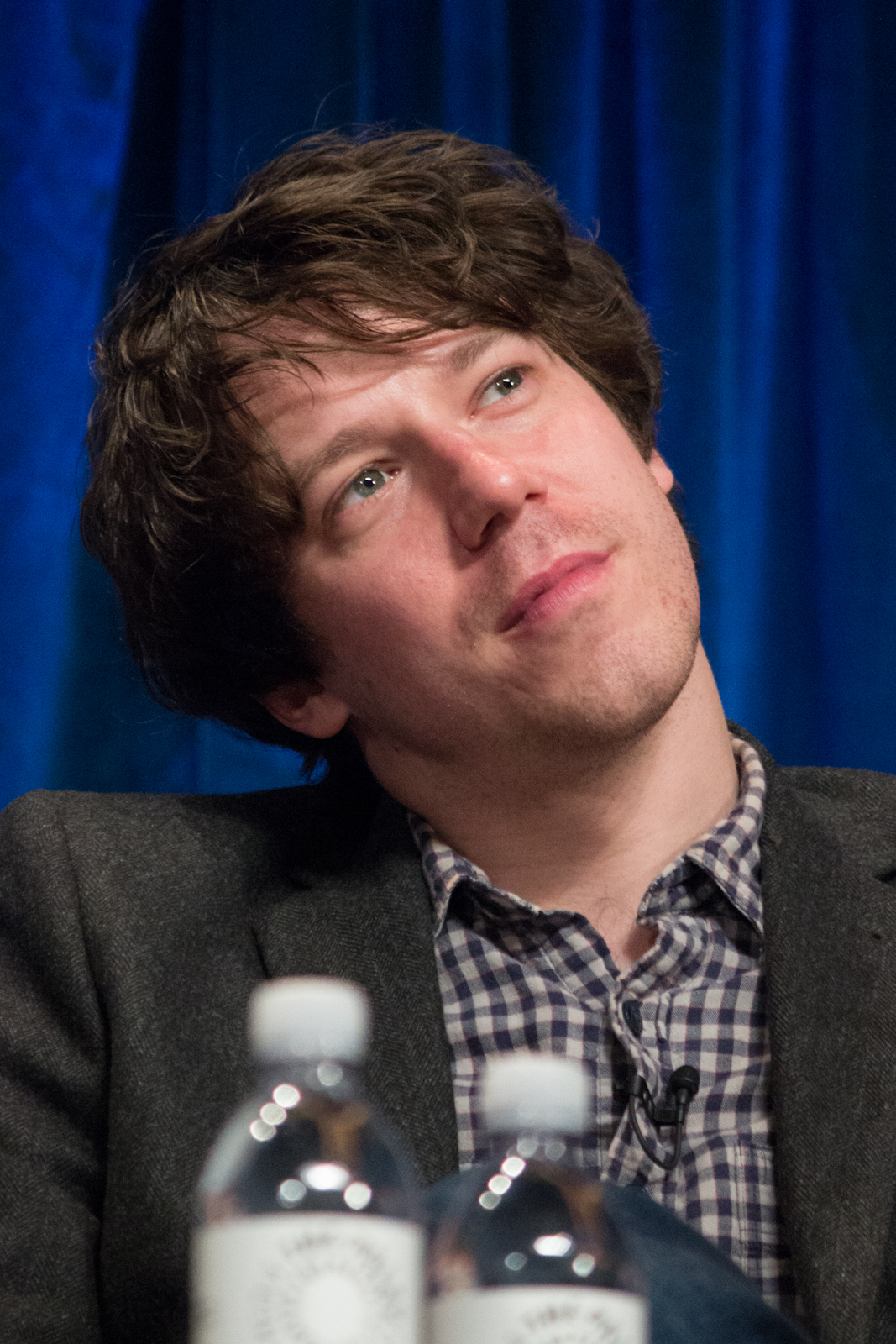
- Gallagher in 2013
- Born: John Howard Gallagher Jr. June 17, 1984 (age 42); Wilmington, Delaware, U.S.
- Other name: Johnny Gallagher
- Occupations: Actor; singer; songwriter
- Years active: 2000–present
- Awards: Tony Award for Best Featured Actor in a Musical
- Website: johngallagherjr.net

John Howard Gallagher Jr. (born June 17, 1984) is an American actor and musician. He broke out onto the scene with his originating role as Moritz Stiefel in Duncan Sheik's Broadway mega-hit Spring Awakening, which would earn him a Tony Award for Best Featured Actor in a Musical. He has since starred in Green Day's Grammy Award-winning rock opera American Idiot and The Avett Brothers' critically acclaimed musical Swept Away. Notable film and TV roles include Jim Harper in Aaron Sorkin's HBO series The Newsroom, Short Term 12, 10 Cloverfield Lane, and Hush among many others. His music has been described as "emo folk rock".

== Early life and career ==
Gallagher was born and raised in Wilmington, Delaware with his two older sisters. John "grew up watching both parents perform music as a serious hobby. Their home welcomed traveling songwriters and folk musicians passing through town." He attended Brandywine High School and played in numerous bands, including Not Now Murray, What Now, Annie's Autograph, and Old Springs Pike. His first girlfriend was actress Aubrey Plaza, whom he did community theater with at the Delaware Children's Theater.

Gallagher moved to NYC as a teenager to pursue acting professionally. He appeared in three plays by David Lindsay-Abaire (originating the role of Jeff in Kimberly Akimbo, appearing in the ill-fated UK production of Fuddy Meers, and receiving critical acclaim for his role in Rabbit Hole which marked his Broadway debut). He also appeared in the Manhattan Theatre Club production of the David Marshall Grant play Current Events. In 2003, Gallagher made his film debut in Peter Hedges' Pieces of April opposite Patricia Clarkson, Oliver Platt, and Alison Pill.

== Stage and screen ==
=== Theater ===
Gallagher originated the role of Moritz Stiefel in Spring Awakening on Broadway after performing the role Off-Broadway and in workshops at Lincoln Center. The rock musical, with music by Duncan Sheik and a book and lyrics by Steven Sater premiered Off-Broadway at the Atlantic Theatre Company on May 19, 2006, and ran through August 5, 2006. Spring Awakening opened on Broadway at the Eugene O'Neill Theatre on December 10, 2006. Gallagher won the 2007 Tony Award for Best Performance by a Featured Actor in a Musical for his performance. On December 16, 2007, he left Spring Awakening and returned to Atlantic Theater to star in Port Authority by Conor McPherson and Farragut North by Beau Willimon.

Gallagher starred in American Idiot, a musical based on the Green Day album of the same name, along with fellow Spring Awakening alumni Brian Charles Johnson and Gerard Canonico. American Idiot premiered in Berkeley, California, at the Berkeley Repertory Theater on September 4, 2009. The show's run ended on November 15, 2009. It began previews on Broadway at the St. James Theatre March 24, 2010, and officially opened on April 20, 2010. It was later nominated for three 2010 Tony Awards, of which it won two. Gallagher played Johnny, or "Jesus of Suburbia". Gallagher departed American Idiot on February 27, 2011. The show's run ended on April 24, 2011.

After leaving American Idiot, Gallagher was featured in the Broadway production of The Royal Court Theatre's Jerusalem with Mark Rylance. The production was directed by Ian Rickson, and opened on April 21, 2011, at the Music Box Theatre. He played the role of Lee until leaving the production on July 17, 2011.

He played Edmund Tyrone in Roundabout Theatre Company's revival of Eugene O'Neill's Long Day's Journey into Night, alongside Jessica Lange, Gabriel Byrne, and Michael Shannon. The show was directed by Jonathan Kent and opened on April 19, 2016, at the American Airlines Theatre.

He then starred in the world premiere production of Swept Away at the Berkeley Repertory Theatre, Arena Stage, and the Longacre Theater on Broadway. Based on the music of The Avett Brothers, the musical reunited Gallagher with Spring Awakening and American Idiot director Michael Mayer. Of note, Gallagher named the Avett Brothers his favorite band in a 2007 New York magazine article. The production received mixed reviews, the production closed after 2 short months on Broadway - prompting Gallagher to write "Life and (Near) Death in Broadway’s ‘Swept Away’" for American Theater Magazine.

=== Film and television ===
Gallagher has appeared in several television programs, including The West Wing, Law & Order: SVU, and Easy. On HBO he has appeared as series regular Jim Harper in Aaron Sorkin's The Newsroom, son of Frances McDormand and Richard Jenkins in the mini-series Olive Kitteridge (based on the Pulitzer-winning novel of the same name), Liam Dempsey Jr. in season 3 of Westworld, and a guest star on High Maintenance.

Gallagher's film credits include Pieces of April, Kenneth Lonergan's Margaret, The Heart Machine, and a lead role in indie darling Short Term 12. Short Term 12's director, Destin Daniel Cretton, described Gallagher as having an innate quality in that the actor "feels like a big brother anyone would want to have." He has starred in a number of horror/thriller films including 10 Cloverfield Lane opposite Mary Elizabeth Winstead and John Goodman, The Belko Experiment directed by Greg McLean and written by James Gunn, and the antagonist in Mike Flanagan's Hush. In 2018 he appeared in The Miseducation of Cameron Post and Sadie, and in 2022 Winona Ryder hand picked him for Gone in the Night.

== Music ==
Gallagher has been writing music since his early adolescent years, playing both solo acoustic and with a rock band. He gigs most often as a solo performer, wielding his Gibson J-45 and lightning bolt strap. Taking inspiration from John Prine, Bruce Springsteen, Paul Westerberg, and Adam Schlesinger - his music is raw, honest, and heartfelt.

John's debut album Six Day Hurricane was released on January 15, 2016 under the name Johnny Gallagher. The album was recorded in Brooklyn in 2012, over the course of six days during Hurricane Sandy. Produced by guitarist Thad DeBrock, this LP drew comparisons to the Laurel Canyon guitars of The Byrds and the lean bar band dynamics of Tom Petty and the Heartbreakers. Following the release, John hit the road as an opening act for Anaïs Mitchell and Aaron Lee Tasjan. Regarding the decision to release his music after a three-year delay, Gallagher said: "I knew I had to do it now, or I was going to go another year or see another birthday without putting my music out, and I can't live with that."

2021 saw the online self release of 8th and Jane, an album described as "a short but sweet 8-song sophomore effort", that is a "fast and fierce postcard jammed with power pop rock and roll numbers, smoothed out by several soul searching acoustic ballads", according to a BroadwayWorld report.

The autobiographical jangle-folk record Goodbye or Something was released in 2024 on the indie label Grand Phony Music. Tracked at Studio G Brooklyn and featuring Zach Jones, Oscar Albis Rodriguez, Chris Cubeta, Hannah Winkler, and Todd Caldwell, it marked his most personal and profound record to date. The release was bookended by a tour with Bandits on the Run and the formation of his latest live band, consisting of co-producers Zach Jones on drums/vocals and Oscar Albis Rodriguez on lead guitar, Hannah Winkler on keys/vocals/guitar, and Tim Lappin on bass. John has also opened for Fantastic Cat, Mike Viola, Dave Hause and collaborated with Alex Orange Drink and Sarah Greenwell of Gymshorts and Greensleeves.

Gallagher's latest EP Almost Ok was released May 29, 2026, with a short midwest spring tour to be followed by a fall tour in support of Nicole Atkins.

== Credits ==
=== Music ===
Year	Title	Label	Producer
2016	Six Day Hurricane	Rockwood Music Hall Recordings	Thad DeBrock
2021	8th and Jane	[self-released]	Thad DeBrock
2024	Goodbye or Something	Grand Phony Music Co.	Oscar Albis Rodriguez Zach Jones
2026	Almost Ok	Grand Phony Music Co.	Oscar Albis Rodriguez Zach Jones

=== Film ===
Year	Title	Role	Notes
2003	Pieces of April	Timmy Burns	
2006	The Good Student	Brett Mullen	
2009	Whatever Works	Perry Singleton	
2010	Jonah Hex	Lieutenant Evan	
2011	Margaret	Darren Rodifer	
2013	Short Term 12	Mason	
2013	Broadway Idiot	Himself	Documentary
2014	The Heart Machine	Cody	
2016	10 Cloverfield Lane	Emmett DeWitt	
2016	Hush	The Man	
2017	The Belko Experiment	Mike Milch	
2018	The Miseducation of Cameron Post	Reverend Rick	
2018	Sadie	Cyrus	
2018	Peppermint	Detective Stan Carmichael	
2019	The Best of Enemies	Lee Trombley	
2019	American Woman	Juan	
2020	Underwater	Liam Smith	
2020	Come Play	Marty	
2021	The Same Storm	Dale Salt	
2022	Gone in the Night	Max	
2022	Spring Awakening: Those You've Known	Himself	Documentary
2022	Abandoned	Alex	
2023	I.S.S.	Christian	
2024	Which Brings Me to You	Wallace	
2026	The Only Living Pickpocket in New York	Businessman	
2027	The Exorcist: Martyrs		Post-production
TBA	Eleven Days		Post-production
TBA	Swim Fishy	Abel	Post-production

=== Television ===
Year	Title	Role	Notes
2001	The Flamingo Rising	Gary	Television film
2002	Law & Order	Terrence Holt	Episode: "Girl Most Likely"
2002	The West Wing	Tyler	Episode: "20 Hours in America (Part 1 & 2)"
2003	Ed	Eric	Episode: "The Decision"
2003	NYPD Blue	Ray Spier	2 episodes
2004	Law & Order: Criminal Intent	Gary	Episode: "Conscience"
2006	Love Monkey	Paul	2 episodes
2009	Law & Order: Special Victims Unit	Jeff Lynwood	Episode: "Lead"
2012–2014	The Newsroom	James "Jim" Harper	25 episodes
2014	Olive Kitteridge	Christopher Kitteridge	Miniseries; 3 episodes
2018	High Maintenance	Zach	Episode: "Steve"
2019	Easy	Lucas	Episode: "Yes"
2019	Modern Love	Rob	Episode: "At the Hospital, an Interlude of Clarity"
2020	Westworld	Liam Dempsey Jr.	4 episodes
2020	Love Life	Luke Ducharme	Episode: "Magnus Lund Part II"

=== Theater ===
Year	Title	Role	Venue	Notes
2000	Current Events	Ethan	New York City Center	Off-Broadway
2001	Kimberly Akimbo	Jeff	South Coast Repertory	Regional
2003	Kimberly Akimbo	Jeff	Manhattan Theatre Club	Off-Broadway
2004	Fuddy Meers	Kenny	Arts Theatre	London
2006	Rabbit Hole	Jason Willette	Pacific Playwrights Festival	Regional
2006	Rabbit Hole	Jason Willette	Biltmore Theatre	Broadway
2006–2007	Spring Awakening	Moritz Stiefel	Atlantic Theatre Company	Off-Broadway
2006–2007	Spring Awakening	Moritz Stiefel	Eugene O'Neill Theatre	Broadway
2008	Port Authority	Kevin	Atlantic Theatre Company	Off-Broadway
2008	Farragut North	Stephen Meyers	Atlantic Theatre Company	Off-Broadway
2009–2011	American Idiot	Johnny (The Jesus of Suburbia)	Berkeley Repertory Theatre	Regional
2009–2011	American Idiot	Johnny (The Jesus of Suburbia)	St. James Theatre	Broadway
2011	Jerusalem	Lee	Music Box Theatre	Broadway
2016	Long Day's Journey into Night	Edmund Tyrone	American Airlines Theatre	Broadway
2018	Nassim	Performer	New York City Center	Off-Broadway
2022–2024	Swept Away	Mate	Berkeley Repertory Theatre	Regional
2022–2024	Swept Away	Mate	Arena Stage	Regional
2022–2024	Swept Away	Mate	Longacre Theatre	Broadway

== Awards and nominations ==
Year	Award	Category	Work	Result
2007	Tony Award	Best Featured Actor in a Musical	Spring Awakening	Won
2007	Drama Desk Award	Outstanding Actor in a Musical	Spring Awakening	Nominated
2007	Broadway.com Audience Choice Award	Favorite Featured Actor in a Musical	Spring Awakening	Won
2007	Drama League Award	Distinguished Performance	Spring Awakening	Nominated
2010	Drama League Award	Distinguished Performance	American Idiot	Nominated
2010	Broadway.com Audience Choice Award	Favorite Leading Actor in a Musical	American Idiot	Won
2014	CinEuphoria Award	Best Supporting Actor	Short Term 12	Nominated
2016	Broadway.com Audience Choice Award	Favorite Featured Actor in a Play	Long Day's Journey Into Night	Won

== External links and reviews ==
- John Gallagher Jr. at IMDb
- John Gallagher Jr. at the Internet Broadway Database
- John Gallagher Jr. at the Internet Off-Broadway Database (archived)
- John Gallagher Jr. Instagram
- John Gallagher Jr. plays "The Once And Future Carpenter" at Gracie Mansion, 2021
- John Gallagher Jr. "Goodbye or Something" official music video, 2024
- Review of John Gallagher Jr's concert at The Kennedy Center, 2024
- Review of John Gallagher Jr's performance in American Idiot on Broadway, April 21, 2010
