= Wonder of the World (play) =

Play by David Lindsay-Abaire

Wonder of the World is a play by American playwright David Lindsay-Abaire. The play premiered at the Woolly Mammoth Theatre Company in 2000 and then ran Off-Broadway in 2001.

== Production ==
The play premiered Off-Broadway at the Manhattan Theatre Club New York City Center Stage 1, opening on November 1, 2001, and closing on January 2, 2002. Directed by Christopher Ashley, the cast starred Sarah Jessica Parker (Cass Harris), Marylouise Burke (Karla), Kevin Chamberlin (Captain Mike), Kristine Nielsen (Lois Coleman), Amy Sedaris (Barbara, Janie, a marriage counselor and various) and Alan Tudyk (Kip). The play was nominated for two 2002 Drama Desk Awards: Outstanding Actress (Play), Sarah Jessica Parker and Outstanding Set Design of a Play, David Gallo.

The play had its world premiere at the Woolly Mammoth Theatre Company in Washington, D.C., from May 22 to July 16, 2000. The play had a reading in November 1999 at the Corcoran Gallery of Art, Washington, D.C.

It was Lindsay-Abaire's second success as a playwright, following his breakout hit Fuddy Meers, which also premiered at Manhattan Theatre Club.

The play was produced by the Barrington Stage Company in Lenox, Massachusetts in July 2006, starring Keira Naughton as Cass.

=== Background ===
After the play's debut in 2000 in Washington, Lindsay-Abaire did "drastic rewriting" for its Off-Broadway production. He said: "I needed to focus on the storytelling aspects of the show. I had lost track of the characters' journey in the second act". He changed the ages of Karla and Glen from in their 30s to seniors: "...when I started thinking about the cast for this show, I immediately thought about Marylouise Burke, who's done four shows of mine...it made sense to have this older couple who've been married for 38 years". He revised the pivotal role of Janie, a therapist, after Amy Sedaris had been cast.

== Overview ==
In the play, a woman named Cass suddenly leaves her husband Kip (after discovering his sexual fetish involving Barbie heads), and hops a bus to Niagara Falls in search of freedom, enlightenment, and the meaning of life. She crosses paths with Lois, a blithely suicidal alcoholic, Captain Mike, a lonely tour-boat captain, Karla and Glen, a pair of bickering private detectives, and a clown therapist, and hears about a strange caper involving a gargantuan jar of peanut butter.

The whimsical tone of the piece is similar to other Lindsay-Abaire plays from the same era.

== Critical response ==
The CurtainUp reviewer wrote: "The new play is not a deeper more substantive follow-up, with less cartoonish characters. Instead, it is basically a reprise of Fuddy Meers, and a less incisive one at that. Nevertheless, it confirms the author as a genuine talent whose madcap imagination and snappy dialogue will one of these days coalesce into a project that will get it all right. In the meantime, Cass's journey from Park Slope, Brooklyn to Niagara Falls offers enough fun -- especially given its slick staging and performances -- to make you forget the troubles in the real world which compensates for its shortcomings".
