= Gone in the Night =

Gone in the Night may refer to:

- Gone in the Night (1996 film)
- Gone in the Night (2022 film)
