= Christine Lindsay-Abaire =

American stage and film actress

Christine Lindsay-Abaire (née Lindsay) is an American stage and film actress. She is married to Pulitzer Prize winning playwright, David Lindsay-Abaire. They live in Brooklyn, New York.

== Filmography ==
=== Film ===
Year	Title	Role	Notes
2021	Christmas on the Carousel	Donna	
TBA	Intermedium	Beth Donovan	
TBA	Beneath the Fold	Elizabeth	

=== Television ===
Year	Title	Role	Notes
1995	Another World	Fiona Merriman	Episode #1.7811
1998	Ghost Stories	—N/a	Episode: "Denial"
2000, 2006	Law & Order: Special Victims Unit	Barbara Collins / Moira	2 episodes
2007	Law & Order: Criminal Intent	Marjorie Riggins	Episode: "Brother's Keeper"
2021	The Blacklist	Maggie Conroy	Episode: "The Skinner (No. 45)"
