= Snow Angel (play) =

Snow Angel is a 1999 play by American playwright David Lindsay-Abaire. The play was first produced in 1998 at Andy's Summer Playhouse in Wilton, NH.

== Synopsis ==
"When the quiet town of Deerpoint, Vermont is hit by the biggest blizzard in 107 years, a mysterious girl named Eva steps out of a snow bank and into the lives of 15 confused teenagers who are asked to help her in her search. What Eva's searching for -- and who she truly is -- becomes a mystery that baffles, divides, and energizes the teens of Deerpoint. Told through journal entries and interactions among the students over the course of a single snow day, Snow Angel is a funny and eerie tale of teen angst, discovery, and the power of believing."

The play begins with all of the teenagers waiting by their radios, listening to the school closings. Just as they begin to celebrate when they hear their school is closed, their teacher has a special announcement for them: they have a journal assignment over the Snow Day. Frida Jensen, the outcast of the group, starts writing stories in her journal about mysterious encounters with a girl named Eva. After finding Frida's journal, the rest of the group begin writing about their meetings with Eva too, and it soon becomes a tangle of truth and lies.

At the end of the play, Frida refuses to accept Crank's claim that Eva set the shed on fire and subsequently drowned, exclaiming "You can't kill her off!," revealing that all the characters have been making Eva up. Frida then begins to say that she saved Eva at the last minute, attempting to hide she made Eva up, and Crank immediately rejects the idea. But then the other members of the group support her, and each say they helped in their own way, to argue against Crank's claims. "Snow Angel" results in Frida Jensen's transformation and acceptance into the group.
