= Justin Cooley =

American actor (born 2003)

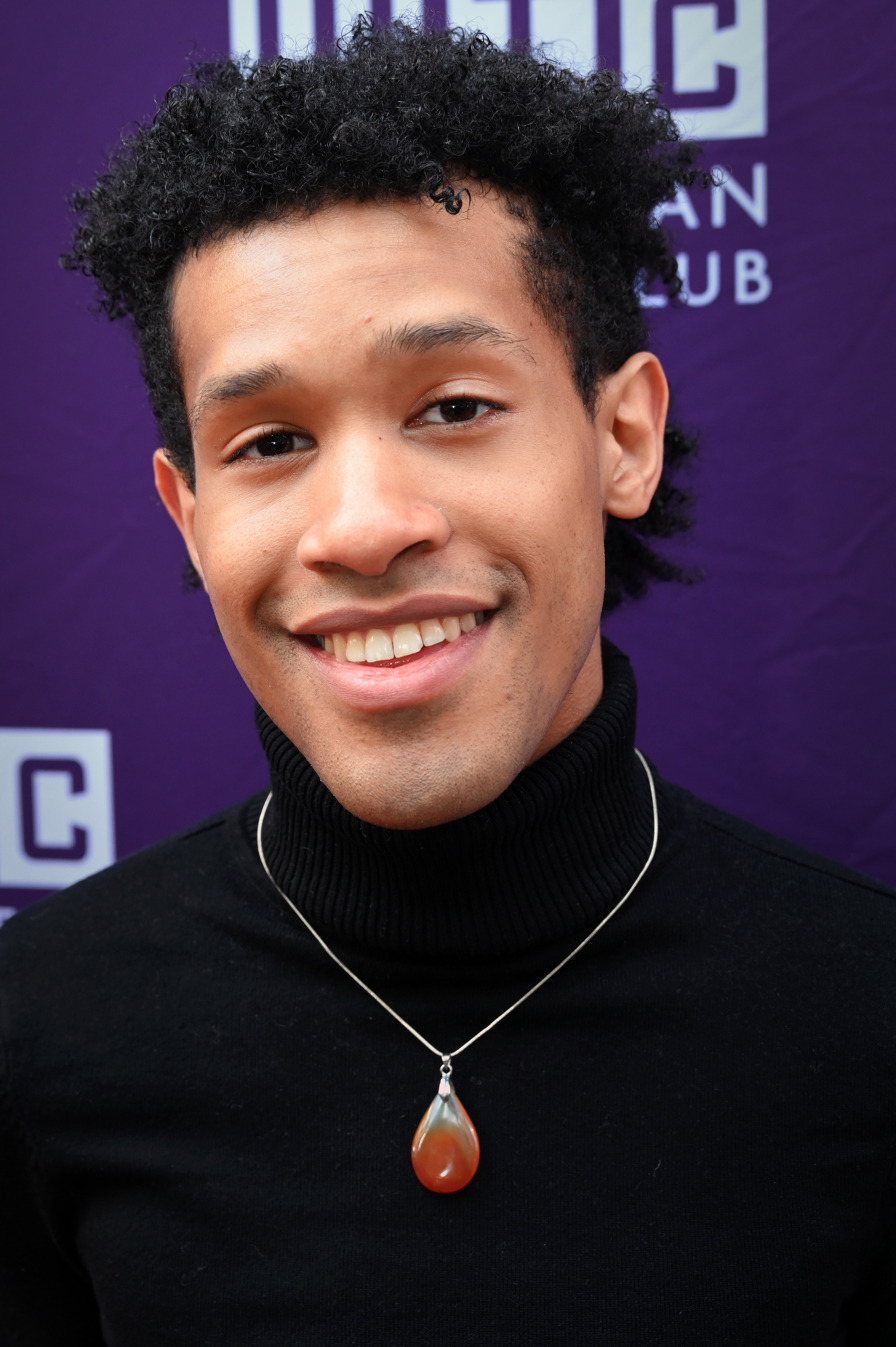
- Cooley in 2026
- Born: June 23, 2003 (age 23)
- Occupation: Actor

Justin Cooley (born June 23, 2003) is an American actor. He was nominated for a Drama Desk Award for Outstanding Featured Actor in a Musical and a Tony Award for Best Featured Actor in a Musical for his role as Seth in the off-Broadway and Broadway theatre productions of Kimberly Akimbo in 2022 and 2023.

== Life and career ==
Cooley was born to Paul and Julie. He grew up in Overland Park, Kansas, and he attended Olathe East High School. He was named outstanding actor in a lead role for the Blue Star Awards, a regional theatre competition for high school students, and became a finalist for the Jimmy Awards. He enrolled at Texas Christian University, but received an offer to join the cast of Kimberly Akimbo and quickly deferred school for one semester to join the production off-Broadway as Seth. Cooley earned a Drama Desk Award nomination for Outstanding Featured Actor in a Musical, a Lucille Lortel Awards nomination for Outstanding Leading Performer in a Musical, an Outer Critics Circle Awards nomination for Outstanding Actor in a Musical, and a Theatre World Award for his performance in the off-Broadway production.

Cooley made his Broadway debut when Kimberly Akimbo moved to the Booth Theatre. He was nominated for a Tony Award for Best Featured Actor in a Musical for his performance.

Cooley has been announced to portray Leaf Coneybear in New World Stages' production of The 25th Annual Putnam County Spelling Bee, which opened November 17th, 2025.

== Filmography ==
=== Film ===
Year	Title	Role	Notes
2026	Pizza Movie	Byron	Film debut

== Theatre credits ==
Year	Title	Role	Venue	Notes
2021	Kimberly Akimbo	Seth	Atlantic Theater Company	Off-Broadway premiere
2022	Kimberly Akimbo	Seth	Booth Theater	Broadway
2025	The 25th Annual Putnam County Spelling Bee	Leaf Coneybear	New World Stages	Off-Broadway

== Awards and nominations ==
Year	Award	Category	Work	Result	Ref.
2022	Drama Desk Awards	Outstanding Featured Actor in a Musical	Kimberly Akimbo	Nominated	
2022	Lucille Lortel Awards	Outstanding Leading Performer in a Musical	Kimberly Akimbo	Nominated	
2022	Outer Critics Circle Awards	Outstanding Actor in a Musical	Kimberly Akimbo	Nominated	
2022	Theatre World Award		Kimberly Akimbo	Honoree	
2023	Tony Awards	Best Performance by a Featured Actor in a Musical	Kimberly Akimbo	Nominated	
2026	Drama League Awards	Distinguished Performance	The 25th Annual Putnam County Spelling Bee	Nominated	
2026	Outer Critics Circle Award	Outstanding Featured Performer in an Off-Broadway Musical	The 25th Annual Putnam County Spelling Bee	Nominated	
2026	Dorian Award	Outstanding Featured Performance in an Off-Broadway Production	The 25th Annual Putnam County Spelling Bee	Nominated	
