= Marylouise Burke =

American actress

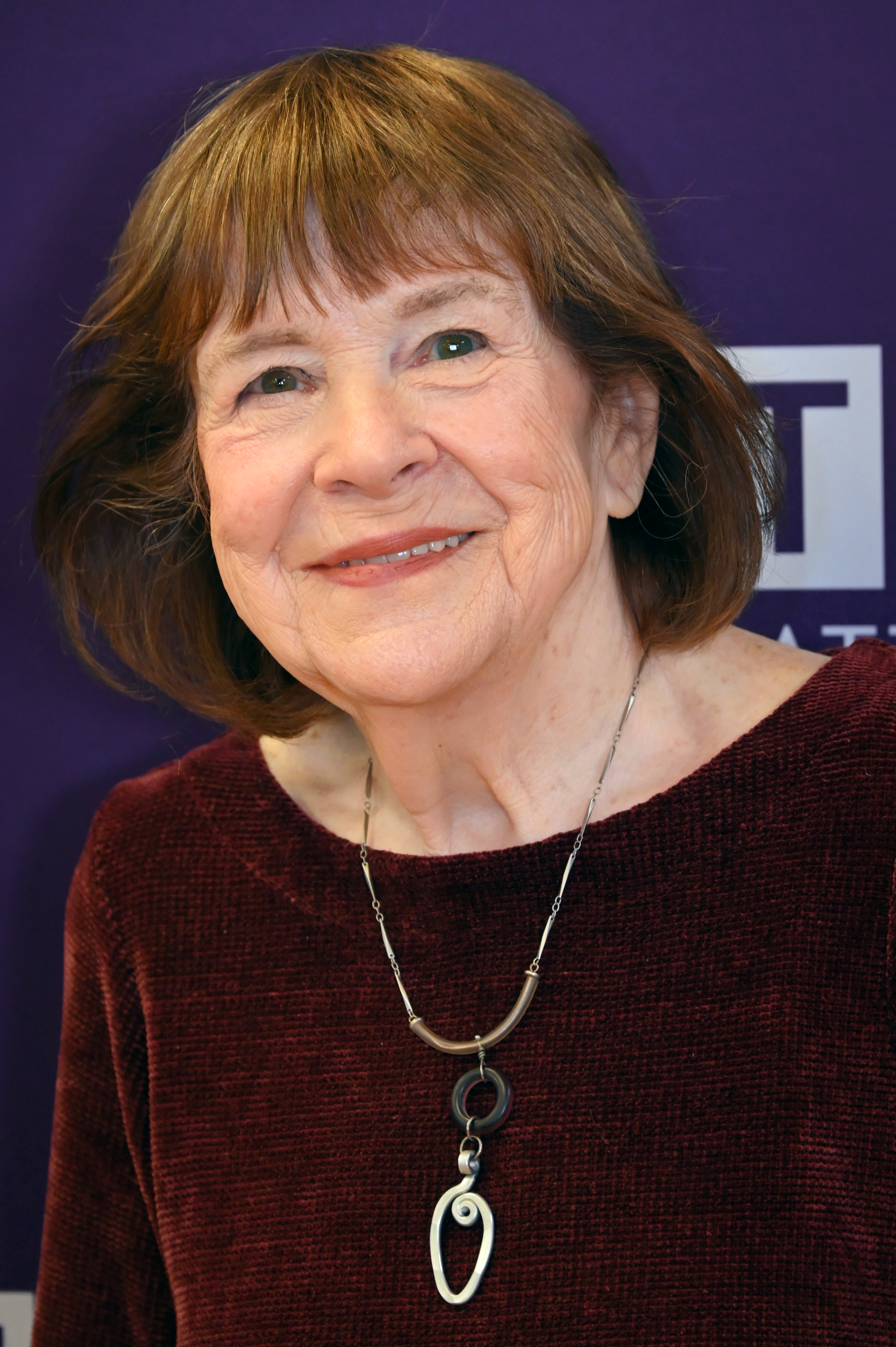
- Burke in 2026
- Born: 1940 or 1941 (age 85–86)
- Education: Lebanon Valley College (BA); University of Wisconsin, Madison (MA)
- Occupation: Actress

Marylouise Burke (born 1940 or 1941) is an American actress. Her roles have included the 2004 Alexander Payne film Sideways, in which she played Phyllis, the mother of the lead character. On stage, she has appeared off-Broadway in Fuddy Meers in 1999, winning the Drama Desk Award for Featured Actress in a Play, and in Kimberly Akimbo in 2003, receiving a Drama Desk Award for Outstanding Actress in a Play nomination. She also played the role of Jack's mother in the 2002 Broadway revival of Into the Woods. She received a Tony Award nomination for the Broadway production of The Balusters in 2026.

== Biography ==
Burke was raised in Steelton, Pennsylvania, attended Lebanon Valley College (in Annville, Pennsylvania), and earned a master of arts in English literature at the University of Wisconsin. She moved to New York City at age 32 to try acting, after working as a copy editor and research assistant.

=== Stage ===
Burke has appeared on Broadway in Inherit the Wind in 1996, Into the Woods in 2002 as Jack's mother, Is He Dead? in 2007, Fish in the Dark in 2015, and True West in 2018-19.

She has appeared in many Off-Broadway plays. She first appeared off-Broadway in The Broken Pitcher by Heinrich Von Kleist at the Martinique Theatre in October 1981. She played "Gertie" in Fuddy Meers which opened at the Manhattan Theatre Club Stage II in November 1999. She appeared in Wonder of the World, written by David Lindsay-Abaire at the Manhattan Theatre Club Stage I in 2001.

Burke played the title role in Kimberly Akimbo, which premiered off-Broadway at the Manhattan Theatre Club New York City Center Stage 1 in February 2003. She performed in Kimberly Akimbo in its debut at the South Coast Repertory Theatre in Costa Mesa, California, from April to May 2001.

She won the 2000 Drama Desk Award for Outstanding Featured Actress in a Play for her appearance as Gertie in Fuddy Meers and was nominated for the 2003 Drama Desk Award, Outstanding Actress in a Play for Kimberly Akimbo.

Burke received the 2014 Obie Award for sustained excellence of performance.

She appeared in the David Lindsay-Abaire play Ripcord at the Manhattan Theatre Club Stage I, which opened in October 2015. This is the fourth play by Lindsay-Abaire in which she appeared.

She was awarded the Richard Seff Award, presented by Actors Equity Foundation for 2019. The award is given to "veteran female and male character actors for their performances in a supporting role in a Broadway or off-Broadway production."

=== Film ===
Burke played Lillian in Meet Joe Black (1998) and the role of Miles' mother in the 2004 film Sideways. She played Delores in the 2005 film The Baxter. She also played Sylvia in 2014 film Wild Canaries. Most recently she has been on the Netflix series as Marty and Wendy Byrde's corrupt marital therapist, Sue Shelby, on Ozark in 2020.

== Filmography ==
=== Film ===
| Year | Title | Role | Notes |
|---|---|---|---|
| 1994 | Angie | Fern | |
| 1995 | Jeffrey | Aunt Phyllis | |
| 1997 | Hudson River Blues | Drena | |
| 1998 | Celebrity | Father Gladden's Fan on Porch | |
| 1998 | One True Thing | Louisa | |
| 1998 | Meet Joe Black | Lilian | |
| 1999 | Bringing Out the Dead | Neighbor Woman | |
| 2000 | Urbania | Yvette - The Poodle Lady | |
| 2001 | Diary of a City Priest | Sister Grace | |
| 2001 | Series 7: The Contenders | Connie | |
| 2002 | Martin & Orloff | Mrs. Flam | |
| 2003 | Mona Lisa Smile | President Jocelyn Carr's Secretary | Uncredited |
| 2004 | King of the Corner | Helen | |
| 2004 | Sideways | Miles's Mother | |
| 2005 | The Baxter | Delores | |
| 2005 | Pizza | Aunt Grandma | |
| 2005 | Must Love Dogs | Aunt Eileen | |
| 2006 | A Prairie Home Companion | Lunch Lady | |
| 2006 | Things That Hang from Trees | Joan Kayser | |
| 2006 | Ira & Abby | Janice | |
| 2007 | The Warrior Class | Madge | Direct-to-video |
| 2007 | The Cake Eaters | Babe | |
| 2008 | We Pedal Uphill | Linda | |
| 2008 | Doubt | Mrs. Deakins | |
| 2009 | I Love You Phillip Morris | Barbara Bascombe | |
| 2010 | Rabbit Hole | Librarian | |
| 2010 | An Invisible Sign | Ms. Gelband | |
| 2012 | That's What She Said | Phyllis | |
| 2012 | Sleepwalk with Me | Aunt Lucille | |
| 2012 | See Girl Run | Grandma | |
| 2014 | Wild Canaries | Sylvia | |
| 2016 | The Comedian | Adele | |
| 2023 | Eric Larue | Wilma Kentworthy | |

=== Television ===
| Year | Title | Role | Notes |
|---|---|---|---|
| 1991, 1997 | Law & Order | Mrs. Collins / Estelle | 2 episodes |
| 2001 | Amy & Isabelle | Arlene | Television film |
| 2003 | Hope & Faith | Nurse Sally | Episode: "Summary Judgement" |
| 2003 | Law & Order: Special Victims Unit | Curious Woman | Episode: "Serendipity" |
| 2004 | My Sexiest Mistake | Carol | Television film |
| 2007 | The Mastersons of Manhattan | Rosemary Finley | Television film |
| 2008 | As the World Turns | Sally | Episode #1.13268 |
| 2008 | Fringe | Flora Meegar | Episode: "Power Hungry" |
| 2009 | 30 Rock | Mom | Episode: "St. Valentine's Day" |
| 2009–2010 | Hung | Jessica's Mother / Lottie | 11 episodes |
| 2012 | Delocated | Janeane | Episode: "Camping" |
| 2014 | Baby Daddy | Mrs. Curtis | Episode: "Life's a Beach" |
| 2014 | Alpha House | Betty Mower | 4 episodes |
| 2015 | Flesh and Bone | Betty | 2 episodes |
| 2016 | The Mysteries of Laura | Mrs. Delvecchio | Episode: "The Mystery of the Dark Heart" |
| 2016 | Crisis in Six Scenes | Lucy | 3 episodes |
| 2016 | The Affair | Donna | Episode #3.1 |
| 2017 | The Mist | Anna | 2 episodes |
| 2017 | Longmire | Beverly | 3 episodes |
| 2018 | Instinct | Ana | Episode: "Long Shot" |
| 2019 | Happy! | Nun | Episode: "Some Girls Need a Lot of Repenting" |
| 2019 | This Close | Hollis | Episode: "No Place Like Home" |
| 2019–2020 | Prodigal Son | Matilda Watkins | 2 episodes |
| 2020 | New Amsterdam | Adele Eisenbaum | 3 episodes |
| 2020 | Ozark | Sue Shelby | 5 episodes |
| 2020 | I Know This Much Is True | Librarian | Episode: "One" |
| 2021–2023 | The Blacklist | Paula Carter | 5 episodes |
| 2023 | Only Murders in the Building | Trixie | Episode: "Thirty" |
| TBA | Constance Cooks | Bettie Pogue | Episode: "Bitter Melons" |

== Stage ==
| Year | Title | Role | Notes |
|---|---|---|---|
| 1981 | The Broken Pitcher | Margaret | |
| 1986 | Eden Cinema | Mother | |
| 1986 | The Return of Pinocchio | Mama | |
| 1996 | Inherit the Wind | Mrs Krebs | |
| 1999 | Fuddy Meers | Gertie | |
| 2001 | Wonder of the World | Karla | |
| 2002 | Into the Woods | Jack's Mother | Los Angeles Pre-Broadway Revival |
| 2002 | Into the Woods | Jack's Mother | Broadway Revival |
| 2003 | Kimberly Akimbo | Kimberly | |
| 2004 | Wintertime | Hilda | |
| 2004 | The Oldest Profession | Vera | |
| 2007 | Is He Dead? | Madame Caron | |
| 2009 | The Savannah Disputation | Margaret | |
| 2009 | Love, Loss, and What I Wore | Performer | |
| 2012 | Rx | Frances | |
| 2015 | Fish in the Dark | Rose Kanter | |
| 2015 | Ripcord | Marilyn | |
| 2017 | Everybody | Death | |
| 2018 | True West | Mom | |
| 2022 | Epiphany | Morkan | |
| 2023 | Infinite Life | Eileen | |
| 2026 | The Balusters | Penny Bewell | |

== Awards and nominations ==
| Year | Award | Category | Work | Result | Ref. |
|---|---|---|---|---|---|
| 2000 | Drama Desk Award | Outstanding Featured Actress in a Play | Fuddy Meers | Won | |
| 2003 | Drama Desk Award | Outstanding Actress in a Play | Kimberly Akimbo | Nominated | |
| 2003 | Outer Critics Circle Award | Outstanding Actress in a Play | Kimberly Akimbo | Nominated | |
| 2023 | Outer Critics Circle Award | Outstanding Lead Performer in an Off-Broadway Play | Epiphany | Nominated | |
| 2023 | Lucille Lortel Award | Outstanding Lead Performer in a Play | Epiphany | Nominated | |
| 2023 | Drama League Award | Distinguished Performance | Epiphany | Nominated | |
| 2024 | Drama Desk Award | Outstanding Featured Performance in a Play | Infinite Life | Nominated | |
| 2026 | Tony Award | Best Featured Actress in a Play | The Balusters | Nominated | |
| 2026 | Drama League Award | Distinguished Performance | The Balusters | Nominated | |
| 2026 | Dorian Award | Outstanding Featured Performance in a Broadway Play | The Balusters | Nominated | |
