= David Lindsay-Abaire =

American writer (born 1969)

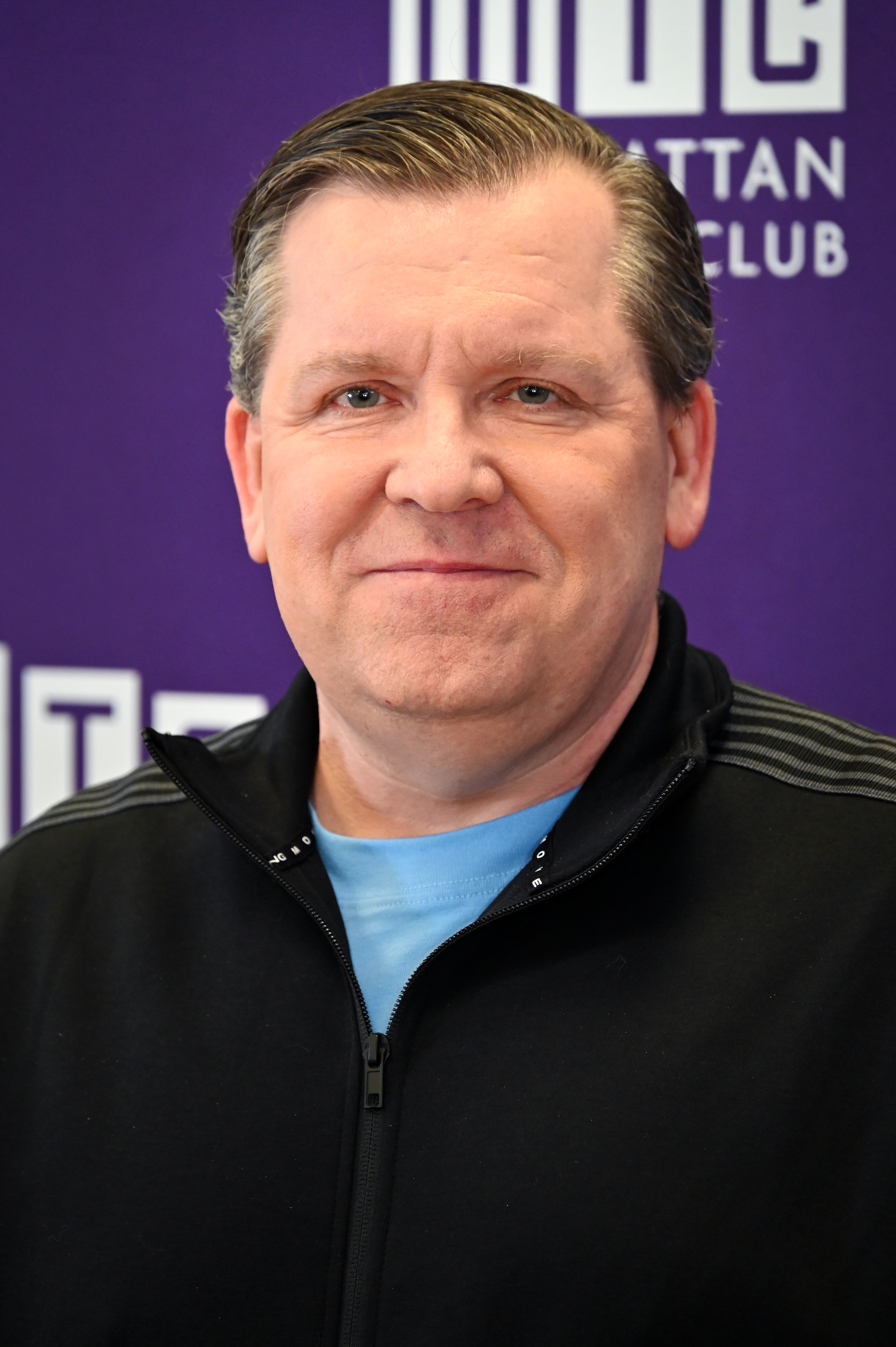
- Lindsay-Abaire 2026
- Born: David Abaire; November 30, 1969 (age 56); Boston, Massachusetts, U.S.
- Education: Sarah Lawrence College (BA); Juilliard School (GrDip)
- Occupations: Playwright; lyricist; screenwriter
- Spouse: Christine Lindsay
- Writing career
- Notable works: Robots; Fuddy Meers; Rise of the Guardians; Kimberly Akimbo; Rabbit Hole; Good People
- Notable awards: Pulitzer Prize for Drama (2007); Tony Award for Best Book of a Musical (2023); Tony Award for Best Original Score (2023)

David Lindsay-Abaire (né Abaire; born November 30, 1969) is an American playwright, lyricist and screenwriter. He received the Pulitzer Prize for Drama in 2007 for his play Rabbit Hole, which also earned several Tony Award nominations. Lindsay-Abaire won both the 2023 Tony Award for Best Book of a Musical and Tony Award for Best Original Score for the musical adaptation of his play Kimberly Akimbo.

== Early life and education ==
David Lindsay-Abaire was born David Abaire in Boston, Massachusetts, and grew up in South Boston. He attended Milton Academy and concentrated in theatre at Sarah Lawrence College, from which he graduated in 1992. He was accepted into the Lila Acheson Wallace American Playwrights Program at the Juilliard School, where he wrote under the tutelage of playwrights Marsha Norman and Christopher Durang from 1996 to 1998. In a 2000 interview, Lindsay-Abaire cited Durang as his greatest influence, adding, "I don't think there's been a piece written about me that hasn't mentioned the fact that he and I live in the same world. But I think I've also been influenced by John Guare and Tina Howe and older folks like Feydeau and Ionesco and Joe Orton."

== Career ==
Lindsay-Abaire had his first theatrical success with Fuddy Meers, which was workshopped as part of the National Playwrights Conference at the Eugene O'Neill Theatre Center in 1998 under Artistic Director Lloyd Richards. The play premiered Off-Broadway at the Manhattan Theatre Club, running from November 2, 1999, to January 2000 and transferred to the Minetta Lane Theatre on January 27, 2000, closing in April 2000 after 16 previews and 78 performances there. He returned to the Manhattan Theatre Club in 2001 with Wonder of the World, starring Sarah Jessica Parker, about a wife who suddenly leaves her husband and hops a bus to Niagara Falls in search of freedom, enlightenment, and the meaning of life.

Lindsay-Abaire also wrote Kimberly Akimbo (2000), Dotting and Dashing (1999), Snow Angel (1999), and A Devil Inside (Off-Broadway, 1997). Among his early short plays, he wrote The Li'l Plays (1997–1999) which are five comedic plays, each 10–15 minutes in length.

His play Rabbit Hole premiered in 2006 on Broadway with Cynthia Nixon, Tyne Daly, and John Slattery, and won the 2007 Pulitzer Prize for Drama. It was nominated for a Tony Award for Best Play, as well as other Tony awards, and Cynthia Nixon won the 2006 Tony Award as Best Actress.

He wrote the book for the musical High Fidelity, which ran on Broadway in December 2006.

He wrote the book and lyrics for the musical Shrek the Musical which ran on Broadway from November 8, 2008 (previews) to January 3, 2010, with Lindsay-Abaire receiving a 2009 Tony Award nomination for Book of a Musical and in the West End in May 2011. The musical ran for 441 performances on Broadway.

Good People officially opened on Broadway on March 3, 2011, with Frances McDormand and Tate Donovan in the lead roles. The play was nominated for the 2011 Tony Award, Best Play and won the 2011 Tony Award, Actress in a Play for McDormand.

His play Ripcord opened Off-Broadway on October 20, 2015, at the Manhattan Theatre Club in a limited engagement. Directed by David Hyde Pierce, the cast features Marylouise Burke, Rachel Dratch, Glenn Fitzgerald, and Holland Taylor. The play focuses on two roommates in a retirement home, who according to Variety "devise dirty tricks...to torment one another."

Lindsay-Abaire has received commissions from Dance Theater Workshop and the Jerome Foundation. He has received awards from the Berilla Kerr Foundation, the Lincoln Center LeComte du Nuoy Fund, Mixed Blood Theater, Primary Stages, the Eugene O'Neill Theatre Center, the Tennessee Williams/ New Orleans Literary Festival, and the South Carolina Playwrights Festival.

In 2021, Lindsay-Abaire adapted his 2000 play Kimberly Akimbo into a musical of the same name, with a score by Jeanine Tesori. The musical premiered in 2021 with the Atlantic Theatre Company before transferring to Broadway's Booth Theatre. The musical opened November 12, 2022. Kimberly Akimbo went on to win 5 Tony Awards, including Best Musical, Best Original Score, and Best Book of a Musical.

=== Film ===
Lindsay-Abaire wrote the screenplay of the 2010 film adaptation of his play Rabbit Hole, which starred Nicole Kidman. His other screenplays have tended to be in the children's fantasy and science fiction genres, including the animated film Robots (2005), written with Lowell Ganz and Babaloo Mandel for the screenplay and Ron Mita and Jim McClain for the story, Inkheart (2008), based on the novel of the same name, the animated film Rise of the Guardians (2012), based on a story by children's author, illustrator and filmmaker William Joyce, who was originally attached to direct the film before stepping down to serve as executive producer, and Oz the Great and Powerful (2013), written with Mitchell Kapner. He also wrote the screenplay for the 2015 horror remake Poltergeist.

== Personal life ==
Lindsay-Abaire and his wife, Christine, are longtime residents of Brooklyn, living in Ditmas Park as of 2022. In 2016, Lindsay-Abaire was named co-director of Juilliard's Lila Acheson Wallace American Playwrights Program.

== Theatre works (selected) ==
- A Devil Inside – 1997, Off-Broadway
- Fuddy Meers – 1999, Off-Broadway
- Snow Angel – 1999, Regional
- Kimberly Akimbo – 2000, Off-Broadway
- Wonder of the World – 2001, Off-Broadway
- Snapshot – 2002, Regional
- Rabbit Hole – 2006, Broadway
- High Fidelity (musical) – 2006, Broadway
- Shrek the Musical (musical) – 2008, Broadway
- Good People – 2011, Broadway
- Ripcord – 2015, Off-Broadway
- Kimberly Akimbo (musical) – 2021, Off-Broadway; 2022, Broadway
- The Balusters – 2026, Broadway

== Filmography ==
- Robots (2005, with Lowell Ganz, Babaloo Mandel, Ron Mita and Jim McClain)
- Inkheart (2008)
- Rabbit Hole (2010)
- Rise of the Guardians (2012)
- Oz the Great and Powerful (2013)
- Poltergeist (2015)
- The Family Fang (2015, with Mitchell Kapner)
- Kung Fu Panda 4 (2024, Additional Screenplay Material)
- Long Day's Journey into Night (2025)

== Awards and nominations ==
Year	Award	Category	Work	Result	Ref.
2000	Outer Critics Circle Awards	John Gassner Playwrights Award	Fuddy Meers	Nominated	
2006	Tony Award	Best Play	Rabbit Hole	Nominated	
2007	Pulitzer Prize for Drama		Rabbit Hole	Won	
2009	Tony Award	Best Book of a Musical	Shrek the Musical	Nominated	
2009	Tony Award	Best Original Score	Shrek the Musical	Nominated	
2009	Drama Desk Award	Outstanding Book of a Musical	Shrek the Musical	Nominated	
2009	Drama Desk Award	Outstanding Lyrics	Shrek the Musical	Nominated	
2011	Tony Award	Best Play	Good People	Nominated	
2011	New York Drama Critics' Circle	Best Play	Good People	Won	
2011	Drama Desk Award	Outstanding New Broadway Play	Good People	Nominated	
2022	Drama Desk Award	Outstanding Lyrics	Kimberly Akimbo	Nominated	
2022	Outer Critics Circle Award	Outstanding New Score	Kimberly Akimbo	Nominated	
2022	Outer Critics Circle Award	Outstanding Book of a Musical	Kimberly Akimbo	Won	
2022	Lucille Lortel Award	Outstanding Musical	Kimberly Akimbo	Won	
2023	Tony Award	Best Book of a Musical	Kimberly Akimbo	Won	
2023	Tony Award	Best Original Score	Kimberly Akimbo	Won	
2026	Tony Award	Best Play	The Balusters	Nominated	
2026	Drama League Award	Outstanding Production of a Play	The Balusters	Nominated	
2026	Drama Desk Award	Outstanding Play	The Balusters	Won	
2026	Outer Critics Circle Award	Outstanding New Broadway Play	The Balusters	Won	
2026	Dorian Award	Outstanding Broadway Play	The Balusters	Won	
2026	Dorian Award	Outstanding Script of a Broadway Play	The Balusters	Won	
