= Gone in the Night (2022 film) =

- Theatrical release poster
- Directed by: Eli Horowitz
- Written by: Eli Horowitz; Matthew Derby
- Produced by: Raphael Margules; J.D. Lifshitz; Shaun Sanghani; Russ Posternak
- Starring: Winona Ryder; Dermot Mulroney; John Gallagher Jr.; Owen Teague; Brianne Tju
- Cinematography: David Bolen
- Edited by: Arndt-Wulf Peemöller
- Music by: David Baldwin
- Production companies: BoulderLight Pictures; SSS Entertainment; Post Film; mm2 Entertainment
- Distributed by: Vertical Entertainment
- Release dates: March 13, 2022 (SXSW); July 15, 2022 (United States)
- Running time: 90 minutes
- Country: United States
- Language: English
- Box office: $266,466

Gone in the Night is a 2022 American thriller film, directed by Eli Horowitz, in his directorial debut from a screenplay by Horowitz and Matthew Derby. It stars Winona Ryder, Dermot Mulroney, John Gallagher Jr., Owen Teague and Brianne Tju.

It was released in theaters on July 15, 2022.

== Plot ==
Kath and her slacker boyfriend Max travel several hours to a woodland cabin which Max has rented for the weekend. When they arrive, late at night, they find a car there and a man named Al standing outside claiming that he has already rented the cabin. Just as Max and Kath are about to leave, Al's girlfriend Greta emerges and suggests that the two should stay.

Kath and Max agree to play a romance-themed board game to get to know the stand-offish Al and the lively, but abrasive, Greta. Kath tells them how she met Max when he was a student of hers. Tired, Kath goes to bed early while the other three stay up.

The next morning, Kath awakens to find everyone gone. Venturing into the surrounding woods, she finds Al, crying. He explains that he found Greta and Max having sex and that the two left together. Angered, Kath returns to the city.

Despite being urged by her friends to move on, Kath decides to try and find Greta and learn what happened. She locates contact info for the cabin owner and arranges a meeting on a pretext. Kath finds the owner, Nicholas Barlow, to be friendly and charming.

Nicholas helps Kath track Greta to an underground rave. They split up to search for her and Kath encounters Greta, who apologizes for stealing Max but says that she loves him. Kath and Nicholas become closer as they commiserate over their shared losses. He explains that he was once a scientist at a biotech startup, but that he gave that life up when his father died of a hereditary disease. Nicholas says that he has the same disease and is using experimental treatments on himself.

Flashbacks reveal Max leaving a party after an argument with Kath. He runs into Al and Greta at a liquor store and goes drinking with them. After asking him some odd questions they invite him to come to a party at the cabin. Greta and Al had sedated Max and kept him hidden until she left. Nicholas, who turns out to be Al's father, arrives at the cabin and discovers what they have done. Al explains that they want Max to be a test subject for Nicholas' treatments.

In the present Kath visits Nicholas at his cabin. When he leaves to get some wood for a fire she discovers a picture of him with Al. In the woods she discovers Max, locked in a shipping container with medical equipment attached. Nicholas, Al and Greta arrive. Nicholas tries to convince Kath that what he's doing is okay. Greta reveals that Nicholas isn't really sick, but is instead using Max as part of a treatment to keep himself youthful. Kath asks Nicholas to use Greta to give her the same treatment. As Nicholas and Al subdue Greta, Kath frees Max, but a delusional Max pulls out his IV, causing himself to bleed to death. Kath locks Nicholas, Al and Greta in the shipping container and wanders back into the cabin.

== Cast ==
- Winona Ryder as Kath
- Dermot Mulroney as Nicholas Barlow
- John Gallagher Jr. as Max
- Owen Teague as Al
- Brianne Tju as Greta
- Yvonne Senat Jones as Laurel

== Production ==
In September 2021, it was announced Winona Ryder, Dermot Mulroney, John Gallagher Jr., Owen Teague and Brianne Tju had joined the cast of the film, with Eli Horowitz directing from a screenplay he wrote alongside Matthew Derby.

== Release ==
The film, then titled The Cow, had its world premiere at South by Southwest on March 13, 2022. Shortly after, Vertical Entertainment acquired distribution rights to the film.

== Reception ==
=== Box office ===
In the United States and Canada, the film earned $123,833 from 136 theaters in its opening weekend.

=== Critical reception ===
On the review aggregator website Rotten Tomatoes, 44% of 63 critics' reviews are positive. The website's consensus reads: "Gone in the Night has a handful of interesting ideas, but they're largely undone by some deeply questionable storytelling choices." Metacritic, which uses a weighted average, assigned the film a score of 52 out of 100, based on 20 critics, indicating "mixed or average" reviews.

Richard Roeper of the Chicago Sun-Times gave the film a score of 2.5/4, writing: "the twist here is so creatively perverted and strange and bizarre that David Cronenberg might approve. Alas, there's just not enough gristle and gore on the bone of this story to make for a memorably haunting viewer experience." He concluded: "Despite the star performance by Winona Ryder and an intriguing setup, 'Gone in the Night' is destined to fade quickly from our memories." Dennis Harvey of Variety wrote: "What at first looks like a standard missing-person suspense tale turns out to have a more complicated agenda — but it is so haphazardly advanced and clumsily articulated, the film itself seems to be fumbling around for a cohering structure or mood." Jon Frosch of The Hollywood Reporter called the film "depressingly slack and indecisive, neither leaning hard enough into its B-movie preposterousness nor taking the time to build any real, sustained suspense."
