= Kimberly Akimbo =

2000 play by David Lindsay-Abaire

- Written by: David Lindsay-Abaire
- Original language: English
- Setting: Bogota, New Jersey, Bergen County

Premiere
- Date premiered: 2001
- Place premiered: South Coast Repertory

Kimberly Akimbo is a play written in 2000 by David Lindsay-Abaire. Its title character is a lonely teenage girl suffering from a disease similar to progeria, that causes her to age four and a half times as fast as normal, thus trapping her inside the frail physical body of an elderly woman. She meets another misfit (a teenage boy) and the two form an attachment to one another that borders on attraction, but their situation is not helped by Kimberly's rapidly deteriorating health. Soon, Kimberly's family gets mixed up in some crazy money schemes, and the family is emotionally destroyed.

== Plot ==
Act 1

Outside of an ice rink, Kimberly sits, waiting for her father, Buddy, who is late picking her up because he was out drinking. Buddy makes an empty promise to Kimberly to take her to Six Flags Wild Safari. Kimberly is begrudgingly taken to a fast-food place, where the two meet Jeff, a social outcast at Kimberly's school. Jeff asks Kimberly to do an interview about her disease for a school project, which Buddy objects to. Pattie, Kimberly's hypochondriac mother, is trying to work a tape recorder, which she struggles with due to large bandages on her hands from surgery. Pattie records a message for her unborn child. Kimberly and Buddy return home, where Pattie chastises Buddy for not getting her food. Kimberly secretly calls Jeff and agrees to an interview the next day at the public library. Kimberly and Jeff discuss her disease, noting that her life expectancy is sixteen years, and make small talk when Debra, Kimberly's deadbeat aunt, appears. Today is Kimberly's sixteenth birthday, and Debra gives her a conch shell. Debra coaxes Kimberly's new address out of her and says she will be there that night. Pattie records another message for her unborn child, mentioning Mr. Hicks, a kind neighbor who secretly has an affair with Pattie to ensure the Levacos would not have another child like Kimberly. Buddy is out late, spoiling Kimberly's plans for a homecooked meal. Debra comes in, dragging a mailbox into the basement. Buddy and Pattie forget Kimberly's birthday. Buddy gives Jeff and Kimberly a ride to school, where Buddy becomes enraged, imagining Jeff attempting to court Kimberly. Debra reveals a plan to wash checks to commit check fraud, using Kimberly's age to play a grandmother. Buddy attempts to reconcile forgetting Kimberly's birthday by bringing her Trouble and a damaged cake. Pattie and Debra join in the game, and Buddy and Kimberly become distracted, poorly swing dancing to a stereo. Kimberly suffers chest pain and begins to have trouble breathing.

Act 2

Buddy is recording a message on the tape recorder, venting his frustrations about being trapped in New Jersey as he grapples his sobriety after making a promise to Kimberly. Kimberly is recovering in her bedroom with Jeff, Pattie, and Debra playing Dungeons and Dragons. The party dies to a surprise attack of Manticores, frustrating Pattie and Debra. Kimberly convinces Debra to split the funds from the check fraud three ways, rather than two. Kimberly is noticeably slowing down. Debra and Buddy begin to fight over a stereo that Buddy agreed to give Debra. Buddy reveals that he hired Debra to beat up Mr. Hicks, however, he died of a fear-induced heart attack when Debra entered. Debra reveals to Jeff that Pattie's baby has no risk of having Kimberly's disease, which Kimberly overhears. Kimberly deduces the connection to Mr. Hicks and becomes terse. Kimberly and Jeff leave to complete the check fraud. Pattie begins having contractions two weeks early from her due date. Pattie tells Kimberly she will have to sleep on the couch as the baby will take her room. Kimberly becomes enraged seeing her father drink, and brings up Mr. Hicks, revealing what she knows. Kimberly wanted to surprise her parents with a trip using the money from the check fraud scheme but gives up after her continued disappointment. Buddy watches her take the car key but does not interfere, too distracted with Pattie's needs. Kimberly leaves, taking Debra's share of the money. Kimberly and Jeff are at the Wild Safari Park, observing the wildlife. A hippo blocks their path, and Jeff turns off the car. After the engine refuses to turn over, he honks the horn and the car is momentarily attacked by many animals, before the engine finally turns over and they speed off.

== Characters ==
- Kimberly, a 16 year old girl, played by a woman in her 60s or 70s
- Buddy, a man in his mid-30s, Kimberly's dad
- Jeff, an awkward, unpopular 16 year old boy
- Pattie, a very pregnant woman in her mid-30s, Buddy's wife
- Debra, a woman in her early 30s, an ex-con, Pattie's sister

== Historical casting ==
Character	South Coast Repertory 2001	Manhattan Theatre Club 2003	A Red Orchid Theatre 2005
Kimberly Levaco	Marylouise Burke	Marylouise Burke	Roslyn Alexander
Aunt Debra	Joanna P. Adler	Ana Gasteyer	Jennifer Engstrom
Buddy Levaco	Steven Flynn	Jake Weber	Matt Kozlowski
Pattie Levaco	Ann Dowd	Jodie Markell	Mierka Girten
Jeff	John Gallagher Jr.	John Gallagher Jr.	Steve Haggard

== Productions ==
The play was initially produced at the South Coast Repertory, Costa Mesa, California, from April 13 to May 13, 2001. Directed by David Petrarca, the cast starred Marylouise Burke as Kimberly. Lindsay-Abaire received the Kesselring Prize in November 2001 for this production. The production received the LA Drama Critics Circle Award for Writing in 2001.

Kimberly Akimbo premiered Off-Broadway at the Manhattan Theatre Club New York City Center Stage 1 on February 4, 2003 and closed on April 6, 2003. Directed by David Petrarca, the cast featured Marylouise Burke (Kimberly), John Gallagher, Jr. (Jeff), Ana Gasteyer (Debra), Jodie Markell (Pattie), Jake Weber (Buddy) and Daniel Zaitchik (Jeff).

Kimberly Akimbo ran from January 21, 2005 through March 6, 2005 at TheaterWorks in Hartford, Connecticut, directed by Rob Ruggiero. The production starred Rosemary Prinz as Kimberly.

The show was presented in Chicago as a midwest premiere production at A Red Orchid Theatre in 2005.

More recently the show put on its first worldwide amateur production at the French Woods Festival of the Performing Arts theater camp during the summer of 2025.

== Musical adaptation ==
A musical adaptation of the play premiered at Atlantic Theater Company in November 2021, with book and lyrics by Lindsay-Abaire and music by Jeanine Tesori. It was critically acclaimed, and won Best Musical prizes at the Drama Desk, Lucille Lortel, and Outer Critics Circle Awards. It began previews on Broadway on October 12, 2022 and opened on November 10 at the Booth Theatre. The show received eight 2023 Tony Award nominations, winning for best musical, book, score, leading actress, and supporting actress.

== Awards and nominations ==
=== 2003 Off-Broadway premiere ===
Year	Award	Category	Nominee	Result	Ref.
2003	Drama Desk Awards	Outstanding Actress in a Play	Marylouise Burke	Nominated	
2003	Outer Critics Circle Awards	Outstanding New Off-Broadway Play		Nominated	
2003	Outer Critics Circle Awards	Outstanding Actress in a Play	Marylouise Burke	Nominated	
