= Rabbit Hole (play) =

2006 play by David Lindsay-Abaire

- Cover of published text
- Original language: English
- Written by: David Lindsay-Abaire
- Characters: Becca Corbett; Howie Corbett; Izzy; Nat; Jason Willette
- Subject: A family copes with the untimely death of a child.
- Genre: Tragedy
- Setting: The Home of Howie and Becca Corbett, Larchmont, NY, Present

Premiere
- Date: 2006
- Place: Pacific Playwrights Festival; Costa Mesa, California

Rabbit Hole is a play written by David Lindsay-Abaire. It was the recipient of the 2007 Pulitzer Prize for Drama. The play premiered on Broadway in 2006, and it has also been produced by regional theatres in cities such as Los Angeles, Philadelphia and Pittsburgh. The play had its Spanish language premiere in San Juan, Puerto Rico in the autumn of 2010.

The play deals with how family members survive a major loss and includes comedy as well as tragedy. Cynthia Nixon won the 2006 Tony Award for Best Performance by a Leading Actress in a Play for her performance as Becca in the New York production, and the play was nominated for several other Tony awards.

== Characters (in order of appearance) ==
Becca—Howie's wife in her late 30s. She is usually a very responsible and sensible person but makes some rash decisions throughout the play because of grief. Howie accuses her of subconsciously trying to "erase" Danny by selling the house, packing up his artwork, and getting rid of their dog, even erasing the most recent home video of Danny.

Izzy—Becca's irresponsible but well-wishing sister. She is unwed but in a relationship with Auggie. She is pregnant throughout the play. Tension is created as Becca's mourning for her lost child lingers, and she is suspicious of Izzy's ability to raise her own.

Howie—Becca's husband in his late 30s. He is very caring but has a hard time dealing with Danny's death, which causes him to be angry and depressed, though he hides it as much as possible. He obsessively watches home movies of Danny and thinks that the best way to move on is to try for another child. He attends group grief counseling meetings. It is implied that he has an affair with a woman from this group. He does not want to meet with Jason, whom he blames for Danny's death.

Nat—Izzy and Becca's mother. She is the voice of reason for her daughters. She helps Howie and Becca in the moving process and provides a motherly experience to Becca. Her son (Becca's brother, Arthur), a heroin addict, hanged himself at the age of 30. Becca, however, does not want to hear this, as she feels that the deaths are not comparable. She eventually realizes that her mother has gone through this as well, and accepts the comfort.

Jason Willette—a 17-year-old boy who accidentally hit Danny with his car, leading to Danny's death. He lives with his mom; his father's whereabouts are never revealed, but the script suggests he's dead. He enjoys science fiction and writes a story about wormholes to other dimensions in Danny's memory, which he publishes in the school's literary magazine. He sends this story to Becca and Howie. He later shows up at the open house, wanting to talk to Howie and Becca. Howie chases him away, but he later meets with Becca. He blames himself for Danny's death.

=== Other characters mentioned ===
Danny—Killed at age 4. Son of Becca and Howie. Heard on a video Howie watches at night. He is on a beach in the video.

Taz—Dog that Danny followed into the street. He is never seen in the play but is heard barking on multiple occasions. Becca doesn't want him (because he reminds her of Danny), but Howie loves him.

Rick and Debbie—friends of Becca and Howie who have a daughter, Emily, Danny's age. Debbie avoids Becca after the accident, but Rick and Howie still play squash together.

Reema—Izzy's friend, a waitress at Calderone's. She sees Howie there with a woman, who is revealed to be a woman from his grief counseling.

Auggie—Izzy's boyfriend and the baby's father. He had a girlfriend when he began a relationship with Izzy.

Arthur—Izzy and Becca's brother, Nat's son. Committed suicide at age 30 after battling heroin addiction.

== Broadway production ==
Rabbit Hole premiered on Broadway at the Biltmore Theatre in a Manhattan Theatre Club production on January 12, 2006, in previews, officially on February 2, 2006, and closed on April 9, 2006, after 77 performances. Directed by Daniel Sullivan, the cast featured Cynthia Nixon (Becca), John Slattery (Howie), Tyne Daly (Nat), John Gallagher, Jr. (Jason) and Mary Catherine Garrison (Izzy).

While John Gallagher, Jr. was in this show, he was in rehearsals for Spring Awakening.

The play was originally commissioned by South Coast Repertory, Costa Mesa, California, and first presented at its Pacific Playwrights Festival reading series in 2005.

The play won the Pulitzer Prize for Drama in 2007. The play received five 2006 Tony Award nominations: for Best Play, Best Direction of a Play, Best Performance by a Featured Actress in a Play (Tyne Daly) and Best Scenic Design of a Play (John Lee Beatty). Cynthia Nixon won the 2006 Tony Award for Best Performance by a Leading Actress in a Play.

== Other productions ==
The Spanish version, Los universos paralelos, premiered at the Palacio Valdés Theatre in Avilés, Spain on March 17, 2017. The production moved to the Teatro Español in Madrid, Spain from September 20 to October 15, 2017. It starred Malena Alterio, Daniel Grao, Carmen Balagué, Belén Cuesta and Itzan Escamilla and was directed by David Serrano. In 2018, the production toured around Spain, visiting cities such as Vigo, Burgos, Gijón, Roquetas de Mar, San Sebastián, Ponferrada, León, and Aranda de Duero, among several others.

The Swedish version premiered at the Teater Trixter on February 23, 2024.

== Film adaptation ==
The movie adaptation, directed by John Cameron Mitchell, premiered at the Toronto International Film Festival in September 2010 and received a limited theatrical release in December 2010. Nicole Kidman stars as Becca Corbett, the character originally played by Nixon. She is also credited as producer of the film. Aaron Eckhart plays Howie Corbett. Other cast members include Dianne Wiest, Tammy Blanchard, Giancarlo Esposito and Sandra Oh.

== Awards and nominations ==
Awards

- Pulitzer Prize for Drama
- Tony Award for Best Actress in a Play – Cynthia Nixon

Nominations

- Tony Award for Best Play
- Tony Award for Best Featured Actress in a Play – Tyne Daly
- Tony Award for Best Direction of a Play – Daniel Sullivan
- Tony Award for Best Scenic Design of a Play – John Lee Beatty

== See also ==
- Rabbit Hole (2010 film)
- Dream House
- Talaash
