= Fuddy Meers =

Play written by David Lindsay-Abaire

- Original language: English
- Written by: David Lindsay-Abaire
- Characters: Claire; Richard; Kenny; Limping Man; Gertie; Millet; Heidi
- Genre: Comedy

Premiere
- Date: 1999
- Place: Manhattan Theatre Club

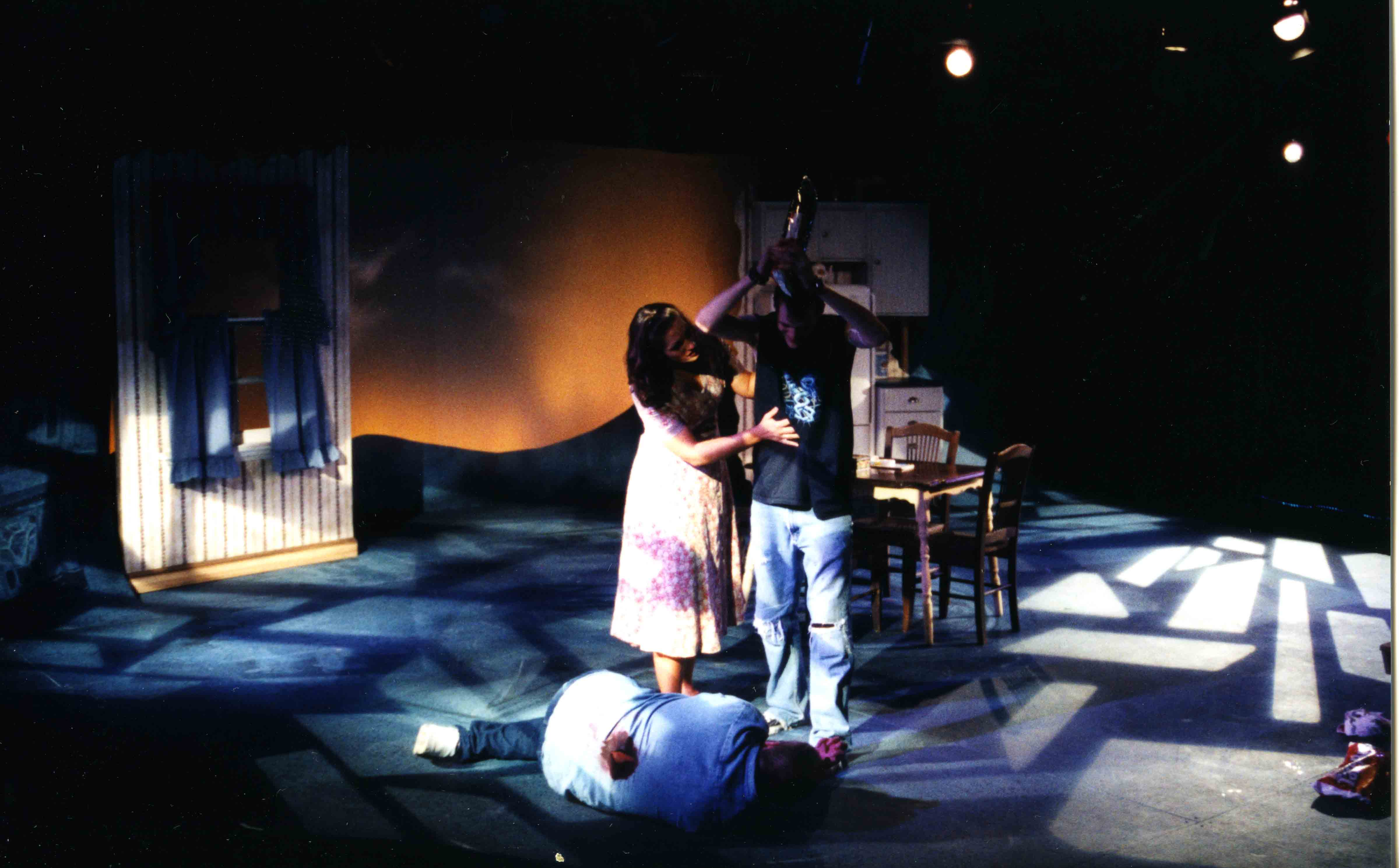
Fuddy Meers at Otterbein University Theatre and Dance

Fuddy Meers is an American play by David Lindsay-Abaire. It tells the story of an amnesiac, Claire, who awakens each morning as a blank slate on which her husband and teenage son must imprint the facts of her life. One morning Claire is abducted by a limping, lisping man who claims her husband wants to kill her. The audience views the ensuing mayhem through the kaleidoscope of Claire's world. The play culminates in a cacophony of revelations, proving that everything is not what it appears to be.

== Production history ==
The play premiered Off-Broadway at the Manhattan Theatre Club, running from November 2, 1999, to January 2, 2000 and transferred to the Minetta Lane Theatre on January 27, 2000, closing in April 2000 after 16 previews and 78 performances there. The play was directed by David Petrarca and featured J. Smith-Cameron (Claire), Marylouise Burke (Gertie) and Patrick Breen (Limping Man).

The play was nominated for the 2000 Outer Critics Circle Award for Outstanding Actress in a Play (J. Smith-Cameron) and the John Gassner Award (David Lindsay-Abaire), and won the 2000 Drama Desk Award, Outstanding Actress (Marylouise Burke).

The play premiered in the West End at the Arts Theatre as the first play produced by Sam Mendes' production company, "Scamp", in 2004, as a co-production with Birmingham Rep and Fiery Angel’s Edward Snape. Directed by Angus Jackson, the cast featured Julia Mackenzie (Gertie), Katie Finneran (Claire), John Gallagher Jr. (Kenny), Matthew Lillard, and Nicholas Le Prevost. The play had a pre-West End engagement at the Birmingham Rep from April 16, 2004 to May 8.

=== Background ===
Lindsay-Abaire wrote the play while a student in the Juilliard School Lila Acheson Wallace American Playwrights Program. The play had a staged reading as part of the National Playwrights Conference at the Eugene O'Neill Theatre Center in 1998 under Artistic Director Lloyd Richards.

The play's title, "Fuddy Meers", is Gertie's (who has had a stroke) attempt to pronounce the phrase "funny mirrors".

== Characters ==
- Claire – about forty, a generally sunny woman with amnesia.
- Richard – about forty, a chatty, friendly, sometimes nervous man.
- Kenny – seventeen, a troubled teen.
- Limping Man – about forty, lisping, limping, half-blind, half-deaf man with secrets unknown to anyone else.
- Gertie – sixties, a clear-headed lady who's had a stroke and can't speak properly.
- Millet – thirties or forties, an odd man with a puppet.
- Heidi – thirties or forties, a tough woman in uniform.

== Synopsis ==
Claire awakens one morning to discover that she is married to a hospital worker named Richard and has a son, Kenny, who has an attitude problem. She learns she has a "psychogenic" form of amnesia, and Richard gives her a book he prepared about her life after re-explaining everything so many times. Everything is as it seems until Zach, or "Limping Man" as he is referred to in the script, appears from under the bed. He claims he is there to rescue Claire and that Richard wants to kill her.

Zach, who 'reveals' he is Claire's brother, takes her to their mother Gertie's house. Gertie is not fond of Zach but cannot say why because of her aphasia. While there, Claire meets Millet, a kind man with an apparent mental disability and a bad-mouthed puppet. It is revealed that Millet and Zach have escaped from prison, although why they were brought to prison remains a mystery.

Meanwhile, Richard takes Kenny to search for Claire. He is pulled over by Heidi and takes her gun, bringing her with him and Kenny as they travel to Gertie's house. But in the meantime Millet – through his puppet – has told Claire about how her husband used to beat her, and she wants nothing to do with Richard. She has also found out that the real Zach, her brother, is dead. As Richard, Kenny and Heidi are entering the house, Claire does not know whom to trust. Gertie takes advantage of the opportunity and stabs Limping Man.

In the ensuing chaos, Kenny is shot in the arm with Heidi's gun and a flurry of revelations come forth. Limping Man is in fact Phil, Claire's abusive ex-husband, while Richard is her new husband. Richard has a criminal past and had framed Millet for stealing an expensive ring. Heidi meanwhile turns out to be a prison cook who met Phil during his time in prison. Claire's world (as well as that of the audience) becomes increasingly clear with each new revelation as she regains more and more of her memory and realizes she is responsible for Limping Man's deformities.

Ultimately, Limping Man's plans are foiled by his love for Claire. We find that Heidi was posing as a police officer to stop Richard and Kenny from reaching Claire, but when Limping Man professes his love for Claire, Heidi turns her back on him. Millet leaves to clear his name, Heidi and Limping Man presumably go to jail, Gertie is safe, and Richard, Kenny and Claire leave in Richard's car. The final act reveals yet another twist.

As Claire talks about updating her memory book, Kenny's negative attitude towards Richard becomes more understandable when the true nature of Claire and Richard's relationship is revealed. Kenny tells of how Richard worked at the hospital where Claire was staying and proposed to her on a daily basis, taking advantage of her memory loss. Apparently, in his attempt to reform his criminal past, he was desperate for companionship; however, all that matters for Claire is that the trio are a family now.

== Reception ==
The production was acclaimed, with sold-out audiences and mostly positive critical reactions, with the New York Times, New York Magazine and Variety among its proponents. John Simon, in his review for New York Magazine "declared that Lindsay-Abaire was Ionesco's 'true heir' (November 8, 1999)." Ben Brantley, in his review of Lindsay-Abaire's play Rabbit Hole for The New York Times, noted: "With works like "Fuddy Meers" and "Kimberly Akimbo," Mr. Lindsay-Abaire established himself as a lyrical and understanding chronicler of people who somehow become displaced within their own lives." In his review of the 1999 production, Brantley wrote that the play was "dark, sweet and thoroughly engaging comedy... Mr. Lindsay-Abaire blends cliched ingredients into something savory and distinctive, with scarcely a tinge of residual staleness... The production is willfully silly and grotesque, yet there's a cool, satisfying strategy in its piecing together of its jigsaw puzzle of a plot." John Heilpern, drama critic for the New York Observer wrote: "Mr. Lindsay-Abaire, a manic farceur with an original mind, surprises us all the way to the nut house and receives my Most Promising Dramatist Award, bummer though it is to be labeled 'promising.'" (Heilpern awarded Lindsay-Abaire the "Heilpern Award for Most Promising Dramatist" in 1999.)

However, while critics were pleased with the humorous content, one critic noted the "loose ends" The CurtainUp reviewer wrote: "If you like your plays neat and orderly, with everything progressing in logical order, Fuddy Meers is not for you. Its prevailing mood is manic, its characters tend towards oddball bizarre. The plot spins wildly out of control with Act 1 ending in total bedlam. However, if you're ready to suspend belief and simply enjoy an imaginative mind at work, you'll have a belly-full of laughs."

Five years after its debut, it had been produced at over 200 venues across the United States.

The play was nominated for the 2000 Outer Critics Circle John Gassner Playwrighting Award.

Reactions were mixed when Sam Mendes launched the first British production of the play. The reviewer in The Guardian pointed to Arsenic and Old Lace and You Can't Take It with You as examples that Americans (in his opinion) had a tradition of works "in which wackiness was a sign of liberating individualism", but that "...it means little to us here." The play also debuted in a traditionally-weak theatre season for London's West End and it closed after only three weeks. Though Fuddy Meers was later produced elsewhere in the UK, it never saw the same success it had seen in North America.

== See also ==
- Mithya

== Notes ==
- About.com: Huntsville, Alabama review
- Amazon.com: Product description (script)
