= Manhattan Theatre Club =

Theatre company in New York City

- Formation: 1972
- Type: Theatre group
- Location: 311 West 43rd Street, New York City, U.S.
- Website: manhattantheatreclub.com

Manhattan Theatre Club (MTC) is a theatre company located in New York City, affiliated with the League of Resident Theatres. MTC entered a new era of leadership with Artistic Director Nicki Hunter, who was appointed in December 2025, and Executive Director Chris Jennings, who joined the theatre in 2023, succeeding Lynne Meadow and Barry Grove, who helmed MTC for 53 and 48 years respectively. Manhattan Theatre Club has grown since its founding in 1970 from an off-off-Broadway showcase into one of the country's most acclaimed theatre organizations.

MTC's many awards include 31 Tony Awards, 7 Pulitzer Prizes, 49 Obie Awards and 52 Drama Desk Awards, as well as numerous Drama Critics Circle, Outer Critics Circle and Theatre World Awards. MTC has won the Lucille Lortel Award for Outstanding Achievement, a Drama Desk for Outstanding Excellence, and a Theatre World for Outstanding Achievement.

MTC produces Broadway and off-Broadway plays and musicals.

== Notable productions ==
- Eastern Standard by Richard Greenberg
- Ruined by Lynn Nottage
- Mauritius by Theresa Rebeck
- LoveMusik, book by Alfred Uhry and songs by Kurt Weill
- Blackbird by David Harrower
- Translations by Brian Friel
- Rabbit Hole by David Lindsay-Abaire
- Doubt by John Patrick Shanley
- Proof by David Auburn
- The Tale of the Allergist's Wife by Charles Busch
- Crimes of the Heart by Beth Henley
- Sight Unseen by Donald Margulies
- Love! Valour! Compassion! by Terrence McNally
- Ain't Misbehavin', the Fats Waller musical
- King Hedley II by August Wilson
- Nocturama by Annie Baker (reading)
- Constellations by Nick Payne
- Jitney by August Wilson
- Lackawanna Blues by Ruben Santiago-Hudson
- Prayer for the French Republic by Joshua Harmon
- Jaja's African Hair Braiding by Jocelyn Bioh
- Mary Jane by Amy Herzog
- Eureka Day by Jonathan Spector
- Stephen Sondheim's Old Friends
- The Balusters by David Lindsay-Abaire

== History ==
Manhattan Theatre Club is a not-for-profit theatre that produces shows in multiple venues: the 650- seat Samuel J. Friedman Theatre—formerly Biltmore Theatre—which they restored and reopened in 2003, and at New York City Center off-Broadway, where they created a 300-seat Stage I and a 150-seat Stage II. MTC productions have earned 7 Pulitzer Prizes, 30 Tony Awards, 51 Drama Desk Awards, and 49 Obie Awards, among many other honors. Lynne Meadow became Manhattan Theatre Club's artistic director in 1972, serving in that position until 2025, when she was succeeded by Nicki Hunter. Barry Grove, who retired in 2023 after 48 years as MTC's Executive Producer, was replaced that summer by Executive Director Chris Jennings.

Writers who have had an artistic home at MTC and returned throughout their careers include David Auburn (Proof; The Columnist; Summer, 1976); lan Ayckbourn (Woman in Mind, Absent Friends, A Small Family Business, House/Garden, Absurd Person Singular); Charles Busch (The Tale of the Allergist's Wife, Our Leading Lady); Harvey Fierstein (Casa Valentina, Bella Bella); Richard Greenberg (Eastern Standard, The American Plan, Three Days of Rain, The Assembled Parties); Beth Henley (Crimes of the Heart, The Miss Firecracker Contest, The Lucky Spot); David Lindsay-Abaire (Fuddy Meers, Kimberly Akimbo, Rabbit Hole, Good People); Donald Margulies (The Loman Family Picnic, Sight Unseen, Collected Stories, Time Stands Still); Terrence McNally (It's Only a Play; Frankie and Johnny in the Clair de Lune; The Lisbon Traviata; Lips Together, Teeth Apart; Love! Valour! Compassion!); John Patrick Shanley (Doubt, Women of Manhattan, Italian American Reconciliation, Defiance, Outside Mullingar); Richard Wesley (The Sirens, The Past is the Past, The Talented Tenth), and Charlayne Woodard (Pretty Fire, Neat, In Real Life). Some who have who have made their MTC debuts in recent seasons include Bekah Brunstetter (The Cake), Sarah Jones (Sell/ Buy/Date), Matthew Lopez (The Whipping Man), Martyna Majok (Cost of Living), Dominique Morisseau (Skeleton Crew), Qui Nguyen (Vietgone), Amanda Peet (The Commons of Pensacola), and Ruben Santiago-Hudson (Lackawanna Blues).

MTC's Artistic Development program offers dramaturgical support, readings, and workshops, as well as a wide range of commissions, which provide artists with the resources to create new work. Just a few of the MTC commissions that have bowed in recent years include Prayer for the French Republic by Joshua Harmon (Playwright), Choir Boy by Tarell Alvin McCraney, and Heisenberg and Morning Sun by Simon Stephens. MTC has also produced plays by some of America's most heralded writers, such as Lillian Hellman (The Little Foxes) and world premieres by John Guare (Gardenia), Elaine May (After the Night and the Music), Arthur Miller (The Last Yankee), Marsha Norman (Last Dance), Lynn Nottage (Ruined), and Sam Shepard (Eyes for Consuela).

Since their 1978 production of Ain't Misbehavin' moved to Broadway, MTC has given many modern American classics their Broadway debuts, including How I Learned to Drive by Paula Vogel, Jitney by August Wilson (also The Piano Lesson, Seven Guitars, and King Hedley II), Fool for Love by Sam Shepard, Venus in Fur by David Ives, and Wit by Margaret Edson. The company has shepherded to the stage musicals such as Stephen Sondheim's Putting It Together, Andrew Lippa's The Wild Party, Alfred Uhry's LoveMusik, and Julia Jordan and Juliana Nash's Murder Ballad.

MTC also has a long history of bringing the work of international writers to American audiences, including world premieres by Alan Ayckbourn; Translations and Aristocrats by Brian Friel; Valley Song, The Captain's Tiger, and many others by Athol Fugard; Ink by James Graham; The Philanthropist by Christopher Hampton; East is East by Ayub Khan-Din; The Children by Lucy Kirkwood; the world premiere of A Kind of Alaska by Harold Pinter; Ashes by David Rudkin; The Ruins of Civilization and Linda by Penelope Skinner; The Memory of Water and An Experiment with an 'Air Pump by Shelagh Stephenson; Three Birds Alighting on a Field by Timberlake Wertenbaker; and The Father and The Height of the Storm by Florian Zeller.

MTC's Learning and Community Engagement program, founded in 1989, was the first education department created by a major theatre company and runs multiple programs annually that use playwrighting and live theatre to serve learners of all ages.

== Facilities ==
At its founding, the Manhattan Theatre Club staged off-off-Broadway productions at Stage 73, located at 321 East 73rd Street.

In 1984, MTC moved to its ongoing Off-Broadway productions to New York City Center's lower level. Its performance space comprises a 299-seat theatre with fixed seating (Stage I) and a 150-seat studio theatre with variable seating configurations (Stage II).

The MTC added a venue for Broadway productions when it purchased the Biltmore Theatre in 2001; the theatre was renamed the Samuel J. Friedman Theatre on September 4, 2008, in honor of Broadway publicist Samuel Friedman. After the 2001 purchase, the MTC commenced renovations, re-opening in October 2003. With 650 seats the Friedman has about two-thirds of the capacity of the old Biltmore Theatre.
