= A Whistle in the Dark =

Play by Tom Murphy

- Poster for the 1961 production, after it had moved to the Apollo Theatre, London
- Original language: English
- Written by: Tom Murphy
- Characters: Michael Carney; Harry Carney; Des Carney; Hugo Carney; Dada; Iggy Carney; Betty; Mush
- Subject: Irish diaspora, family, violence, masculinity
- Setting: a living-room in Michael's house in Coventry, c. 1961

Premiere
- Date: September 11, 1961
- Place: Joan Littlewood's Theatre Royal, Stratford East, London.

A Whistle in the Dark is a play by Tom Murphy that premiered on September 11, 1961 at the Joan Littlewood's Theatre Royal, Stratford East, London, having been rejected by the Abbey Theatre, Dublin. It then went on to be a West End hit. Murphy was twenty-five years old at the time.

The play tells the story in three acts of the climactic confrontation between Michael, the oldest of the Carney sons, and his father and brothers, a brawling, hard-drinking, criminal gang of Irish immigrants living and working in Coventry. A powerful portrayal of tribal violence and the devastation it brings in its wake in spite of attempts to stand against it, it remains Murphy's best known and most performed play. John Lahr of The Village Voice saw its influence in Harold Pinter's The Homecoming. Other plays showing its influence are Gary Mitchell's In a Little World of Our Own, Rod Wooden's Your Home In The West and Jimmy Murphy’s The Kings of The Kilburn High Road.

The Abbey Theatre, the National Theatre of Ireland, and the National Theatre of Great Britain have announced details of a future co-production of A Whistle in the Dark, this updated production will be directed by Co-Director of the Abbey Theatre, Artistic Director Caitríona McLaughlin, and will star award-winning actor Paul Mescal, who will make his debut at the National Theatre in London.

== Original cast ==
- Patrick Magee as Michael Carney Sr. (Dada)
- Michael Craig as Michael Carney Jr.
- Derren Nesbitt as Harry Carney
- Dudley Sutton as Des Carney
- Dorothy Bromiley as Betty
- Oliver MacGreevy as Iggy Carney
- James Mellor as Hugo Carney
- Sean Lynch as Mush O’Reilly

== Canadian productions ==
In 2005, Toronto's The Company Theatre (TCT) chose A Whistle in the Dark for its debut production at Canadian Stage's Berkeley Street Theatre. Helmed by Irish director Jason Byrne, the show played for three weeks in Toronto with an all-star cast of Canadian actors:

- Joseph Ziegler as Michael Carney Sr. (Dada)
- Jonathan Goad as Michael Carney Jr.
- Allan Hawco as Harry
- Philip Riccio as Des
- Sarah Dodd as Betty
- Oliver Becker as Iggy
- Aaron Poole as Hugo
- David Jensen as Mush

Stage Manager Robert Harding joined the creative team as stage manager, with Kinnon Elliott as his assistant stage manager. Set and costume designer John Thompson and lighting designer Andrea Lundy rounded out the team. Thompson would go on to work extensively with TCT, designing sets for Marion Bridge (2007), Festen (2008), Through the Leaves (2010), The Test (2011), and Speaking in Tongues (2012/13).

A Whistle in the Dark was named "Best of 2005" in multiple Canadian newspapers, including The Globe and Mail, National Post, Now Magazine, and eye weekly. Richard Ouzounian of the Toronto Star called it "the most muscular piece of theatre we've seen in Toronto in some time," going on to add that "[The Company Theatre's] choice of a worthy play, a first-class director and an excellent cast show it knows what it takes to make good drama."

The production received two 2005 Dora Mavor Moore Award nominations in the Independent Theatre category: Outstanding Production and Outstanding Lead Performance Male for Joseph Ziegler.

In 2007, TCT remounted A Whistle in the Dark with Jason Byrne directing. Much of the cast remained the same, though Richard Clarkin took on the role of Iggy Carney and Dylan Roberts played Mush. The show played at LSPU Hall in St. John's, Newfoundland in March and at Toronto's Young Centre for the Performing Arts in April of that year.

== Radio adaptation ==
BBC Radio 3 gave the first radio broadcast on 20 December 2009, directed by Roland Jaquarello.
