= John (play) =

2015 play by Annie Baker

- Written by: Annie Baker
- Genre: Comedy-Drama

Premiere
- Date: July 22, 2015
- Place: Signature Theater

John is a play from Pulitzer Prize winning American playwright Annie Baker. The show premiered off-Broadway at New York's Signature Theatre Company in 2015, and was directed by Sam Gold. Time ranked John as one of its top 10 plays and musicals of 2015, where it took the number four spot. The play also reached number eight on the Hollywood Reporter's list of the "Best New York Theatre of 2015."

== Premise ==
At a weekend bed & breakfast, the shadow of infidelity hangs over a young couple struggling to rebuild their relationship – when the elderly owner shares her own memories, ghosts real and imagined arrive to haunt the living.

== Cast ==
Characters	Off-Broadway debut (2015)	West End debut (2018)
Elias	Christopher Abbott	Tom Mothersdale
Jenny	Hong Chau	Anneika Rose
Mertis	Georgia Engel	Marylouise Burke
Genevieve	Lois Smith	June Watson

== Production history ==
=== World premiere ===
John opened Off-Broadway at the Signature Theatre on July 22, 2015 (previews). It was directed by Sam Gold and starred Georgia Engel and Lois Smith. The play ran to September 6. This marked the fifth time that Baker and Gold worked together, starting with Circle Mirror Transformation in 2009. The play is set in a bed and breakfast in Gettysburg, Pennsylvania. Time ranked it at No. 8 on its list of Top Ten Plays and Musicals for 2015. It is No. 8 in The Hollywood Reporter's "Best New York Theater of 2015". The New York Times wrote that the play is a "...haunting and haunted meditation on topics she has made so singularly her own: the omnipresence of loneliness in human life, and the troubled search for love and lasting connection."

John was nominated for the 2016 Lucille Lortel Awards, Outstanding Play; Outstanding Lead Actress in a Play (Georgia Engel); Outstanding Featured Actress in a Play (Lois Smith); Outstanding Scenic Design (Mimi Lien); and Outstanding Lighting Design (Mark Barton). John received six 2016 Drama Desk Award nominations: Outstanding Play; Outstanding Actress in a Play (Georgia Engel); Outstanding Director of a Play; Outstanding Set Design for a Play (Mimi Lien); Outstanding Lighting Design for a Play (Mike Barton); and Outstanding Sound Design in a Play (Bray Poor). John won the 2016 Obie Awards for Performance for Georgia Engel and a Special Citations: Collaboration, for Annie Baker, Sam Gold and the design team.

=== Canadian premiere ===
The Company Theatre (TCT) brought the Canadian premiere of John to Canadian Stage's Berkeley Street Theatre in 2017. Directed by Jonathan Goad, a member of TCT's ensemble, John starred TCT's co-Artistic Director Philip Riccio as Elias and Loretta Yu as Jenny. Nancy Beatty played Mertis, the owner of the B&B Elias and Jenny visit, while Nora McLellan took on the role of Genevieve, Mertis' Blind friend. The critically acclaimed production boasted a familiar creative team, with Kevin Lamotte (lighting design: Belleville, 2014; Domesticated, 2015), Michael Laird (sound design: Marion Bridge, 2007; Festen, 2008; Through the Leaves, 2010; Speaking in Tongues, 2012/13), and Michael Sinclair (stage management: Speaking in Tongues, 2012/13; Belleville, 2014; Domesticated, 2015) all returning to the TCT. Shannon Lea Doyle, a TCT newcomer, designed the production's set.

The production was nominated for four 2017 Dora Mavor Moore Awards in the Independent Theatre category: Riccio received a nod for Outstanding Performance Male, both Beatty and McLellan were nominated for Outstanding Performance Female, and Doyle was nominated for Outstanding Set Design. McLellan and Doyle won in their respective categories. John was also picked up three awards at the 2017 Toronto Theatre Critics Awards: Best Supporting Actress (McLellan), Best International Play, and Best Production (John tied with Ex Machina/Canadian Stage's production of Robert LePage's 887 ).

=== London premiere ===
John opened in the West End at the National Theatre in January 2018. It was directed by James Macdonald, and starred Marylouise Burke (Mertis) and June Watson (Genevieve). Andy Propst of Time Out ranked it the 40th best play ever written, and it made a 2019 list by The Independent.

== Awards and nominations ==
The 2016 off-Broadway production was critically acclaimed and was nominated for five Lucille Lortel Awards, six Drama Desk Awards, and two Obie Awards.
