= The Test (play) =

Theatre play

The Test is the English-language translation of Swiss playwright Lukas Bärfuss' 2007 play Die Probe (Der brave Simon Korach). Themes of the play include family, paternity and identity. The translation was first staged in Toronto by The Company Theatre (TCT) in association with Canadian Stage in 2011. According to Christopher Hoile of Stage Door, The Test paints "the frightening image of the older generation so self-obsessed with creating a 'legacy' that it has driven away anyone who could possible carry it on."

== World Premiere ==
The English translation of Bärfuss' Die Probe had its world premiere on the Berkley Street Theatre Stage in Toronto in January 2011. A co-production between TCT and Canadian Stage, the show was directed by Irish-Canadian director Jason Byrne, a longtime collaborator of TCT who also helmed A Whistle in the Dark (2005/2007) and Festen (2008). Set designer John Thompson (A Whistle in the Dark, 2005/07; Marion Bridge, 2007; Festen, 2008; Through the Leaves, 2010) returned to TCT for the production was joined by sound designer Richard Feren. The cast of five included several TCT alumni, including co-artistic director Philip Riccio, as well as a score of newcomers:

- Eric Peterson as Simon
- Sonja Smits as Helle
- Gord Rand as Peter
- Liisa Repo-Martell as Agnes
- Philip Riccio as Franzeck

In 2012, Riccio received the Toronto Theatre Critics Award for Best Supporting Actor in a Play for his role in The Test. Peterson also received a Special Citation for his work as Simon.
