= The Company Theatre =

The Company Theatre is a Toronto-based independent theatre company that produces provocative international plays with Canada's best actors.

== History ==
The Company Theatre (TCT) was created in 2004 by Canadian actors Allan Hawco and Philip Riccio. Their goal was to create a company that encouraged actors to use their natural human instincts to create the most powerful, viscerally exciting on-stage performances possible. Wanting to provide audiences with exciting, relatable and thought-provoking experiences, they focused on producing Canadian premieres of deeply human international stories. Today, TCT works with a mix of established and emerging actors from across the country, inspiring them to embrace their instincts in each performance to create radically live theatre. Sometimes provocative and often hard-hitting, TCT's shows stem from a place of curiosity and authenticity, free from choreographed and often limiting choices.

Their debut production, the Canadian premiere of A Whistle in the Dark, opened in 2005 to great critical acclaim. Helmed by Irish director Jason Byrne, who quickly became a regular face in TCT productions, the company's production of Tom Murphy's masterpiece was described by the National Post as “one of the best things ever seen in Canada.” The show was so successful that it was remounted it in 2007 in highly acclaimed runs at both LSPU Hall in Newfoundland and Toronto's Young Centre for the Performing Arts.

=== Canadian Stage Partnership ===
In 2010, TCT began a five-year partnership with Canadian Stage, with five shows featured as part of the Toronto-based company's subscription series. The first play of the partnership was the 2011 original English translation of Lukas Bärfuss’ The Test, for which artistic director and performer Philip Riccio received a Toronto Theatre Critics Award for Best Supporting Actor in a Play. The second production, Australian playwright Andrew Bovell's Speaking in Tongues, saw the stage debut of acclaimed Australian-Canadian actor Helene Joy. After a successful run in 2012, TCT re-mounted the show at the Belfry Theatre in Victoria, BC, in January 2013.

In 2014, co-Artistic Director and co-founder Allan Hawco returned to the stage after a five-year hiatus to perform in Amy Herzog's Belleville, the third play in the partnership. He worked alongside TCT ensemble member Christine Horne, as well as newcomers Dalmar Abuzied and Marsha Regis.

TCT's 2015 interpretation of The Seagull by Anton Chekhov, a co-production with Crow's Theatre, received a sold-out run. In the same year, TCT and Canadian Stage closed their partnership with a production of Bruce Norris's Domesticated. The play starred Paul Gross and Martha Burns, alongside a cast of nine other actors, in what was TCT's largest ensemble production since 2008's Festen. Due to the popularity of the production, Domesticated ran for an extended, completely sold-out fifth week at the 244-seat Berkeley Street Theatre downstairs space.

=== Return to Self-Produced Theatre ===
With their Canadian Stage partnership complete, TCT returned to self producing in January 2017 with the Canadian premiere of Annie Baker's John. The production was directed by TCT ensemble member Jonathan Goad in his directorial debut, and starred Nancy Beatty, Nora McLellan, Philip Riccio, and Loretta Yu. John opened to immense critical acclaim, receiving top marks from the Globe and Mail, Toronto Star, NOW Magazine and various other publications.

TCT's most recent production, Jez Butterworth's Jerusalem, was co-produced with Toronto-based theatre company Outside The March. The Canadian premiere of the play starred Kim Coates ("Sons of Anarchy" and "Bad Blood") in his epic return to the stage after 27 years of working exclusively in film and television. The 14-member cast marked TCT's largest production to date, and was composed of both TCT veterans and newcomers. Due to the overwhelmingly positive response to the show, TCT extended their run of Jerusalem at the Streetcar Crowsnest for a fifth sold-out week, and went on to earn seven Dora Mavor Moore Awards, including Outstanding Production and the Jon Kaplan Audience Choice Award.

=== Training Programs and Development Opportunities ===
Since their inception in 2004, TCT has produced a variety of development workshops for actors, writers, and directors. Some of their most successful sessions included a workshop exploration of Canadian playwright Ivana Shein's play The Lovers; a deep-dive into the work of Canadian poet Anne Carson, led by acclaimed Australian director Lindy Davies; and several in-depth explorations of the works of Anton Chekhov and Harold Pinter.

In an effort to share their unique rehearsal and performance process with more creators, in 2019, TCT piloted an emerging directors program. Four directors were selected to attend a week-long workshop run by esteemed directors who had previously worked with TCT. Throughout the workshop, participants had the opportunity to work with 15 professional actors, using TCT's unique working method to explore scenes. In its inaugural year, the program focused on providing opportunities for women directors, with plans to focus on other under-represented groups in subsequent years.

In the fall of 2020, the company introduced the Blueprint New Play Development Program to their roster of development opportunities. Over the course of two years, selected playwrights have the opportunity to work closely with TCT writing mentors, preparing the first draft of their plays for a staged reading led by a professional director and featuring union performers.

== Intermission Magazine ==
In the summer of 2015, TCT was awarded a Strategic Initiatives grant from the Metcalf Foundation to aid in the creation of a digital theatre magazine. Having noticed the rapid decline of theatre coverage in Toronto and across Canada, the company came up with an online publication meant to empower and showcase artists across the country. In March 2016, TCT officially launched Intermission Magazine — an online platform for Canadian theatre artists and arts journalists to share their voices and help develop audience engagement. The site currently features articles, videos, photography and illustrations from over 300 Canadian theatre artists, ranging from high-profile interviews with some of Canada's most beloved actors to news pieces and artist perspectives from local writers. In its inaugural year, NOW Magazine named Intermission one of its “Bright Lights of 2016,” and Torontoist selected the company as one of their “Heroes of 2016.”

== Past productions ==
Year	Production	Playwright	Theatre
2005	A Whistle In the Dark	Tom Murphy	Berkeley Street Theatre, Toronto
2007	Marion Bridge	Daniel MacIvor	Young Centre, Toronto
2008	Festen	Thomas Vinterberg, Mogens Rukov, Bo Hr. Hansen	Berkeley Street Theatre, Toronto
2010	Through The Leaves	Franz Xaver Kroetz	Tarragon Theatre, Toronto
2011	The Test	Lukas Bärfuss	Berkeley Street Theatre, Toronto
2012	Speaking In Tongues	Andrew Bovell	Berkeley Street Theatre, Toronto
2014	Belleville	Amy Herzog	Berkeley Street Theatre, Toronto
2015	The Seagull	Anton Chekhov	Berkeley Street Theatre, Toronto
2015	Domesticated	Bruce Norris	Berkeley Street Theatre, Toronto
2017	John	Annie Baker	Berkeley Street Upstairs Theatre, Toronto
2018	Jerusalem	Jez Butterworth	Crow's Theatre, Toronto

== Awards and nominations ==
Year	Show	Award	Category	Recipient	Result
2005	A Whistle in the Dark	26th Dora Mavor Moore Awards (Independent Theatre)	Outstanding Production	The Company Theatre	Nominated
2005	A Whistle in the Dark	26th Dora Mavor Moore Awards (Independent Theatre)	Outstanding Performance - Male	Joseph Ziegler	Nominated
2007	Marion Bridge	28th Dora Mavor Moore Awards (Independent Theatre)	Outstanding Performance by a Female	Sarah Dodd	Won
2009	Festen	30th Dora Mavor Moore Awards (Independent Theatre)	Outstanding Production	The Company Theatre	Nominated
2009	Festen	30th Dora Mavor Moore Awards (Independent Theatre)	Outstanding Direction	John Byrne	Nominated
2009	Festen	30th Dora Mavor Moore Awards (Independent Theatre)	Outstanding Performance - Male	Philip Riccio	Nominated
2011	Through the Leaves	32nd Dora Mavor Moore Awards (Independent Theatre)	Outstanding Production	The Company Theatre	Won
2011	Through the Leaves	32nd Dora Mavor Moore Awards (Independent Theatre)	Outstanding Direction	Philip Riccio	Nominated
2011	Through the Leaves	32nd Dora Mavor Moore Awards (Independent Theatre)	Outstanding Performance - Male	Nicholas Campbell	Nominated
2011	Through the Leaves	32nd Dora Mavor Moore Awards (Independent Theatre)	Outstanding Performance	Maria Vacratsis	Nominated
2011	Through the Leaves	32nd Dora Mavor Moore Awards (Independent Theatre)	Outstanding Scenic Design	John Thompson	Won
2012	The Test	2nd Toronto Theatre Critics Awards	Best Supporting Actor in a Play	Philip Riccio	Won
2017	John	Dora Mavor Moore Awards (Independent Theatre)	Outstanding Performance - Male	Philip Riccio	Nominated
2017	John	Dora Mavor Moore Awards (Independent Theatre)	Outstanding Performance - Female	Nancy Beatty	Nominated
2017	John	Dora Mavor Moore Awards (Independent Theatre)	Outstanding Performance - Female	Nora McLellan	Won
2017	John	Dora Mavor Moore Awards (Independent Theatre)	Outstanding Scenic Design	Shannon Lea Doyle	Won
2017	John	Toronto Theatre Critics' Awards	Best Production of a Play	The Company Theatre	Won
2017	John	Toronto Theatre Critics' Awards	Best International Play	The Company Theatre	Won
2017	John	Toronto Theatre Critics' Awards	Best Supporting Actress in a Play	Nora McLellan	Won
2018	Jerusalem	Dora Mavor Moore Awards (General Theatre)	Outstanding Production	The Company Theatre, Outside the March, and Starvox Entertainment	Won
2018	Jerusalem	Dora Mavor Moore Awards (General Theatre)	Outstanding Direction	Mitchell Cushman	Won
2018	Jerusalem	Dora Mavor Moore Awards (General Theatre)	Outstanding Performance by a Male in a Principal Role	Kim Coates	Won
2018	Jerusalem	Dora Mavor Moore Awards (General Theatre)	Outstanding Performance by an Ensemble	Jason Cadieux Nicholas Campbell Brenna Coates Shakura Dickson, Diana Donnelly Peter Fernandes, Christo Graham Daniel Kash Evan Kearns David Kohlsmith Katelyn McCulloch Philip Riccio Kieran Sequoia Michael Spencer-Davis	Won
2018	Jerusalem	Dora Mavor Moore Awards (General Theatre)	Outstanding Scenic Design	Nick Blais	Won
2018	Jerusalem	Dora Mavor Moore Awards (General Theatre)	Outstanding Lighting Design	André du Toit	Won
2018	Jerusalem	Dora Mavor Moore Awards (General Theatre)	John Kaplan Audience Choice Award	The Company Theatre, Outside the March, and Starvox Entertainment	Won
2018	Jerusalem	Toronto Theatre Critics Awards	Best Design	Nick Blais (scenic), Lindsay Dagger Junkin (costume), André du Toit (lighting), and Richard Feren (music & sound)	Won
