= Allan Hawco =

Newfoundland writer, actor and producer

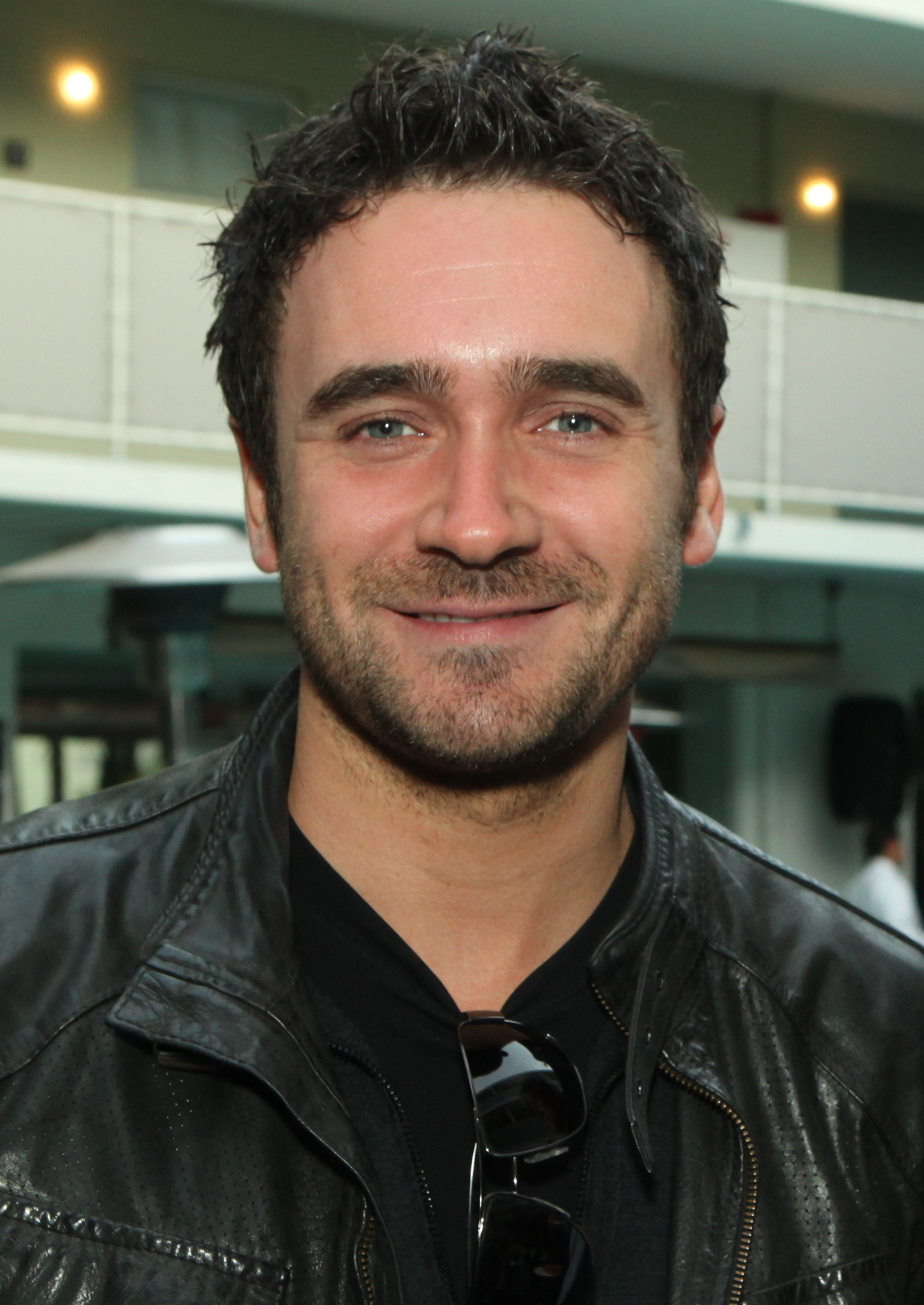
- Born: Bell Island, Newfoundland, Canada
- Education: National Theatre School of Canada
- Occupations: Actor, writer, producer
- Years active: 1996–present
- Spouse: Carolyn Stokes (m. 2012)

Allan Hawco is a Canadian writer, actor, and producer from Bell Island, Newfoundland. He is best known for his roles in the series Tom Clancy's Jack Ryan, Republic of Doyle, Saint-Pierre, The Book of Negroes, and Caught.

== Early life and education ==
Allan Hawco was born on Bell Island, Newfoundland and Labrador, as the youngest of four children, and moved to Goulds at a young age. His father Michael worked on the Bell Island Ferry, and his mother Mary was an elementary school teacher and former nun.

He studied business at Memorial University of Newfoundland, but dropped out to attend the National Theatre School of Canada.

After appearing in a Shakespeare by the Sea production of Macbeth directed by Aiden Flynn, director Danielle Irvine encouraged the young actor to audition for the National Theatre School of Canada, where he was one of 13 selected from thousands of applicants that year. He graduated from the National Theatre School of Canada in 2000.

== Career ==
Hawco worked in many of the major theatres in Canada. In 2005, motivated by the want for greater creative control, he started his own production company the Company Theatre with Philip Riccio. The company's inaugural production, A Whistle in the Dark, brought Hawco critical acclaim. Their 2009 production of Festen won him three Dora Awards, including Outstanding Production of a Play.

Some of Hawco's earlier movie roles include Canadian productions such as Making Love in Saint Pierre, Above and Beyond, and Love and Savagery, the latest of which won him an ACTRA nomination for Outstanding Male Performance. His career took off with the launch of his own TV series Republic of Doyle, which premiered in 2010. Hawco is co-creator with Perry Chafe and Malcolm MacRury, executive producer, lead actor, head writer as well as the show's showrunner. The show has been sold to over 90 countries, and maintained over a million viewers a week on CBC television in Canada.

In 2010, Hawco was nominated for the ACTRA Toronto award for Outstanding Performance – Male for his performance in Love and Savagery. He was also nominated that year for two Gemini Awards, Best Performance by an Actor in a Continuing Leading Dramatic Role and Best Dramatic Series for his work as actor, co-creator, writer and executive producer of Republic of Doyle.

In 2011, Hawco was the recipient of the National Theatre School's prestigious Gascon-Thomas Award.

Also in 2011, Hawco was presented with the Canadian Film and Television Hall of Fame's Outstanding Achievement Award.

In 2016, Hawco's production company in Newfoundland produced the Netflix original series: Frontier, starring Jason Momoa. Hawco also stars in the series as well as functioning as an executive producer on the show.

In 2018, Hawco served as executive producer, writer/showrunner and starred in the CBC adaptation of Lisa Moore's novel Caught. The series received a number of CSA nominations including best series and a best actor nod for Hawco. Caught's other screen writers include Hawco's writing partner Perry Chafe, John Krizanc, Julia Cohan, and Adriana Maggs. Caught is distributed by eOne entertainment, and eOne exec Tecca Crosby was the inspiration behind the making of the limited series according to interviews with Hawco on the topic.

In 2019, Hawco starred as "Coyote" in the Amazon Prime TV series Jack Ryan alongside John Krasinski and Wendell Pierce. Jack Ryan was written by Lost creator Carlton Cuse. Filming took place in Colombia. Also in 2019, Hawco featured as Captain Donovan in the British-Canadian suspense drama Departure.

== Personal life ==
One of Hawco's brothers, Greg, is a composer, and has composed for Republic of Doyle, while his father has also worked on the show and his mother has appeared as a background performer.

Hawco married CBC anchor Carolyn Stokes in 2012 in the midst of working on Republic of Doyle.

== Filmography ==
=== Films ===
Year	Title	Role	Notes
1998	When Ponds Freeze Over	Young Paddy	Short film
2002	Apartment Story	Ramone	TV movie
2004	Making Love in St. Pierre	Sebastian	
2004	Wilby Wonderful	Radio Announcer	Voice only
2005	Snapshots for Henry	Pent	Short film
2006	The Secret Miracle	Ryan Kilpatrick	Short film
2007	The Third Eye	Ryan	
2007	Closing the Ring	Peter Etty	
2009	Love and Savagery	Michael	
2009	Quiet at Dawn	Manning	Short film
2015	Hyena Road	MCpl. Travis Davidson	
2016	Weirdos	Dave	
2017	The Child Remains	Liam	
2022	The Breach	John Hawkins	
2023	Quicksand	Josh	
2024	Soul's Road	Gordie Robinson	
2025	In Cold Light	Bob Whyte	

=== Television ===
Year	Title	Role	Notes
2002	Sue Thomas: F.B.Eye	Mitch	Episode: "The Heist"
2003	Mutant X	Scientist	Episode: "Under the Cloak of War"
2003	The Eleventh Hour	Linus	Episode: "Hall of Mirrors"
2004	Bliss	Andrew	Episode: "Steph's Life"
2004	H_{2}O	Christie Berger	Mini-series
2005	Heritage Minutes	Evers	Episode: "Home from the Wars"
2006	Slings and Arrows	Mr. Waugh	Episode: The Promised End?
2006	Above and Beyond	Nathan Burgess	Mini-series
2008	The Trojan Horse	Christie Berger	Mini-series
2009	ZOS: Zone of Separation	Captain Mick Graham	Mini-series
2010-2014	Republic of Doyle	Jake Doyle	Series lead; also co-creator, writer, director and producer
2010	This Hour has 22 Minutes	Jake Doyle	1 episode skit
2013	Murdoch Mysteries	Jacob Doyle	Episode: "Republic of Murdoch"
2015	The Book of Negroes	Solomon Lindo	Mini-series
2016-2018	Frontier	Douglas Brown	Main cast
2018	Caught	David Slaney	Also writer and producer
2019	Street Legal	Cole Haney	2 episodes
2019	Departure	Captain Donovan	6 episodes
2019	Tom Clancy's Jack Ryan	Coyote	6 episodes
2020	The Detectives	Detective Garry Belliveau	1 episode
2021	Hudson and Rex	Danny	Episode: Manhunt
2021	Another Life	Gabriel	Episode: Will to Power
2021-2023	Moonshine	Gale Favreau	11 episodes
2023	Sullivan's Crossing	Andrew Mathews	3 episodes
2025-	Saint-Pierre	Donny "Fitz" Fitzpatrick	Series co-lead; also co-creator, writer and producer

=== Theatre ===
Year	Title	Role	Notes
2014	Belleville	Zach	The Company Theatre, director: Jason Byrne
2008	Festen	Michael	The Company Theatre, director: Jason Byrne
2005	A Whistle in the Dark	Harry	The Company Theatre, director: Jason Byrne
2004	Who's Afraid of Virginia Woolf?	Nick	Manitoba Theatre Centre, director: Michael Shamata
2003	Richard III	Richard III	LSPU Hall-Resource Centre for the Arts, director: Aiden Flynn
2002	Shape of Things	Adam	Canadian Stage, director: James Guedo
2002	Macbeth	Malduff	Festival of Classics, director: Michael Shamata
2002	The Cripple of Inishmaan	Bartley	Centaur Theatre, director: Ben Barnes
2001	Salt-Water Moon	Jacob	Saidye Bronfman Centre, director: Chris Abraham
2001	You Are Here	Paul/Justin	Theatre Passe-Muraille, director: Daniel MacIvor
2001	La Ronde	Young Gentleman	Soulpepper Theatre Company, director: Herbert Olschok
2001	Present Laughter	Fred	Soulpepper Theatre Company, director: Joseph Ziegler
2001	Triumph of Love	Agis	Pleiades Theatre, director: John Van Burek
2001	Macbeth	Malcolm	The Grand Theatre Company, director: Susan Ferley
2000	Twelfth Night	Sebastian	Resurgence Theatre Company, director: Chris Abraham
1999	The Return of the Curse of the Mummy's Revenge!	The Mummy/Milhouse	LSPU Hall-Resource Centre for the Arts, director: Danielle Irvine
1998	Goodnight Desdemona (Good Morning Juliet)	Romeo	LSPU Hall-Resource Centre for the Arts, director: Danielle Irvine
1998	A Midsummer Night's Dream	Demetrius	Shakespeare by the Sea-First Light Productions, director: Jillian Keiley
1997	Place of First Light: The Bell Island Experience	Billy Swain/Nish Jackman	First Light Productions, director: Danielle Irvine
1996	Macbeth		Shakespeare by the Sea-First Light Productions, First Light Productions, director: Danielle Irvine

== Awards ==
Year	Award	Category	Film/play	Result
2005	Birdland Young Actor Award		A Whistle in the Dark	Won
2010	ACTRA Awards	Outstanding Male Performance	Love & Savagery	Nominated
2010	Gemini Awards	Best Dramatic Series	Republic of Doyle	Nominated
2010	Gemini Awards	Best Performance by an Actor in a Continuing Leading Dramatic Role	Republic of Doyle	Nominated
2011	Gascon Thomas Award-National Theatre School	Achievement given by National Theatre School for “exceptional contribution to the growth of theatre,”		Won
2011	Outstanding Achievement Award	Playback’s Canadian Film and Television Hall of Fame		Won
2018	Canadian Screen Awards	Limited Series or Program	Caught	Nominated
2018	Canadian Screen Awards	Lead actor, drama program or limited series	Caught	Nominated
