= Marla Rubin =

Canadian theatre producer

- Born: Montreal, Canada
- Education: Columbia University, University of Manchester
- Occupation: Theatre Producer
- Years active: 2000–present

Marla Rubin is a Canadian West End and Broadway theatre producer. She has won the Olivier Award and South Bank Sky Arts Award.

She is known for originating plays based on Scandinavian books and films, and has helped launch the careers of a number of high-profile actors, directors and writers, including Tom Hardy, Rory Kinnear, Rufus Norris, John Tiffany, and Jack Thorne.

Rubin began her career working in television documentaries. Her stage productions are recognised for their transgressive subject matter and for championing society's misfits and underdogs.

== Education ==
Marla Rubin is one of the historic first five women to graduate from Columbia University's undergraduate division, Columbia College. In 1985 she graduated magna cum laude and Phi Beta Kappa with a bachelor's degree in psychology and East Asian studies. Rubin was awarded an international fellowship to study in Japan in 1986. In 1999, she earned a master's degree from the University of Manchester and Sotheby's Institute of Art.

Rubin was a board member of the Danenberg Oberlin College-in-London Program.

== Productions ==
Let the Right One In - Adapted for the stage by Jack Thorne and directed by John Tiffany. The production received its world premiere at Dundee Repertory Theatre (2012), before transferring to the Royal Court Theatre, London (2013), the Apollo Theatre, West End (2014), and St. Ann's Warehouse, New York (2015). In addition to a US tour (2016), there have also been international productions of the play produced in Japan (2015), Finland (2015), Norway (2015), Korea (2016), Iceland (2016), Denmark (2016), Mexico (2017), Australia (2017 and 2022), Hungary (2017), Ireland (2018), Sweden (2019), Turkey (2019), Romania (2019), El Salvador (2019) and USA (2023). Upcoming productions of the show include Korea (2025) and New Zealand (2026).

The Mountaintop - Written by Katori Hall and directed by James Dacre. The show received its world premiere at Theatre 503, London (2010), before transferring to Trafalgar Studios, West End (2010) starring David Harewood, and to the Bernard B. Jacobs Theatre, Broadway (2011), directed by Kenny Leon and starring Samuel L. Jackson and Angela Bassett. Subsequent productions have been produced throughout the United States and Canada (2012–present).

Festen - Adapted for the stage by David Eldridge and directed by Rufus Norris. The production premiered at the Almeida Theatre, London (2004), before transferring to the Lyric Theatre, West End (2004), and the Music Box Theatre, Broadway (2006). The play has also been produced internationally at theatres including the Sydney Opera House (2005), the Arts Theatre, Melbourne (2006), Gate Theatre, Dublin (2006), Habima Theatre, Jerusalem (2008), as well as productions in South Africa (2007), Canada (2008), Cyprus (2009) and Turkey (2011), and a national tour of the United Kingdom (2007).

== Awards and nominations ==
Let the Right One In

- 2013 South Bank Sky Arts Awards, London: Winner Best New Play in UK (2013).
- 2015 Drama Desk Awards, New York: Nominee Outstanding Play: Jack Thorne, Outstanding Director: John Tiffany, Outstanding Set Design: Christine Jones, Outstanding Sound Design: Gareth Owen.

The Mountaintop

- 2011 Olivier Awards, London: Winner Best New Play (2011) and Nominee Best Actress: Lorraine Burroughs.
- 2011 Evening Standard Awards, London: Nominee Most Promising Playwright: Katori Hall and Best Actor: David Harewood.

Festen

- 2004 Critics Circle Theatre Awards, London: Winner Best Director: Rufus Norris
- 2004 Evening Standard Awards, London: Winner Best Director: Rufus Norris and Best Set Design: Ian MacNeil
- 2005 WhatsOnStage Awards, London: Winner Best New Play
- 2005 Olivier Awards, London: Nominee Best New Play: David Eldridge, Best Director: Rufus Norris, Best Set Design: Ian MacNeil, Best Lighting Design: Jean Kalman, Best Sound Design: Paul Arditti
- 2005 Sydney Theatre Awards, Winner Best Director: Gayle Edwards and Best Set Design: Brian Thomson
