= Georgia Engel =

American actress (1948–2019)

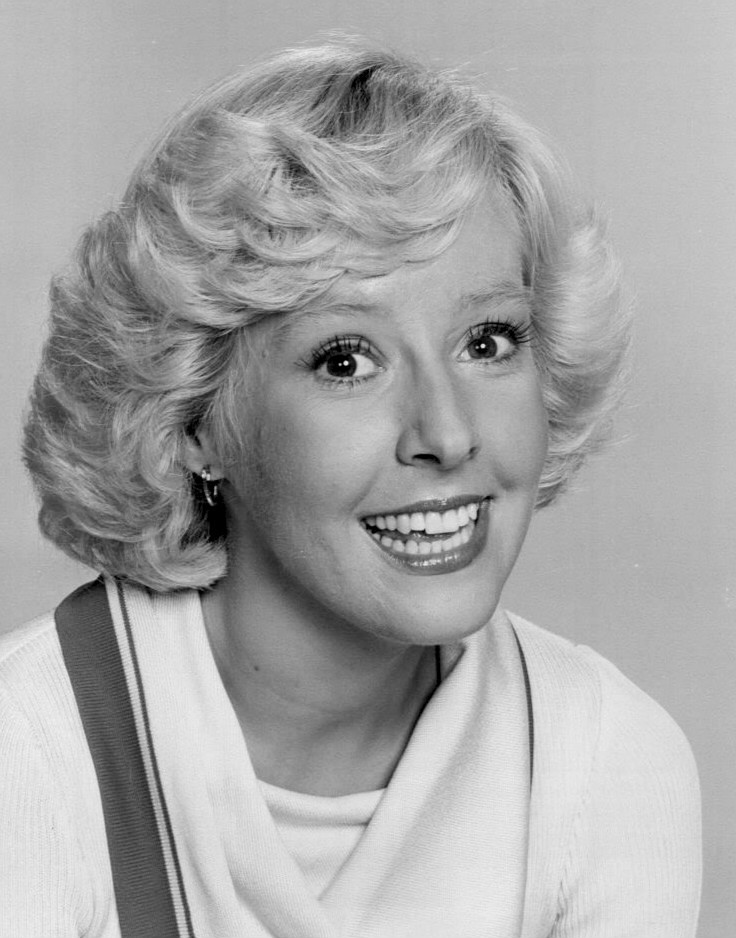
- A photo of Engel from The Betty White Show, 1977
- Born: Georgia Bright Engel; July 28, 1948; Washington, D.C., U.S.
- Died: April 12, 2019 (aged 70); Princeton, New Jersey, U.S.
- Resting place: Cape Charles Cemetery, Cape Charles, Virginia, U.S.
- Education: Walter Johnson High School; University of Hawaii at Manoa
- Occupation: Actress
- Years active: 1969–2018
- Known for: The Mary Tyler Moore Show; Everybody Loves Raymond; Hot in Cleveland

Georgia Bright Engel (July 28, 1948 – April 12, 2019) was an American actress and comedian.

She played Georgette Franklin Baxter in the sitcom The Mary Tyler Moore Show from 1972 to 1977, Pat MacDougall on Everybody Loves Raymond from 2003 to 2005, and Mamie Sue on Hot in Cleveland from 2012 to 2015. She was nominated for five Primetime Emmy Awards and a BAFTA award.

== Early life ==
Georgia Engel was born on July 28, 1948, in Washington, D.C. She was the daughter of Ruth Caroline (née Hendron) and Benjamin Franklin Engel, who was a vice admiral in the United States Coast Guard. Engel attended a school in Kodiak, Alaska, Walter Johnson High School in North Bethesda, Maryland, and the Academy of the Washington Ballet from which she graduated. She earned a theater degree from the University of Hawaii at Manoa.

== Career ==
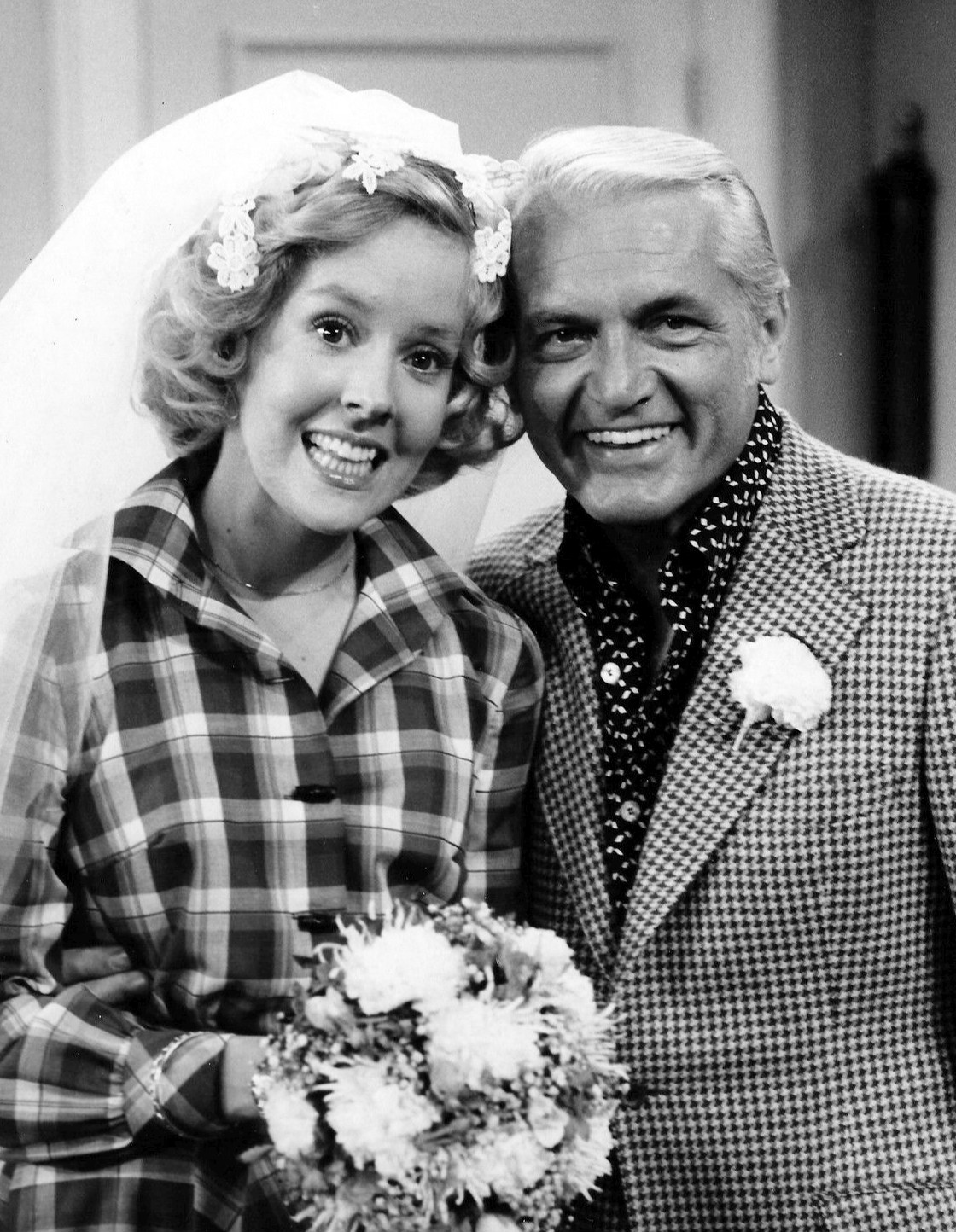
The wedding of Georgette and Ted in 1975

After college, Engel appeared in musical productions with Washington's American Light Opera Company. She moved to New York City in 1969, appearing off-Broadway in Lend an Ear, and for a year as Minnie Fay in the Broadway production of Hello, Dolly!, starting in December 1969. A 1971 off-Broadway production of The House of Blue Leaves eventually played in Los Angeles, where Engel was seen by Mary Tyler Moore and her husband, producer Grant Tinker, her soon-to-be employers.

Engel portrayed the character Georgette on The Mary Tyler Moore Show from 1972 until the sitcom ended in 1977. The role won her two Emmy nominations. After that sitcom ended, she teamed up with former Mary Tyler Moore Show co-star Betty White for The Betty White Show during its only (1977–78) season. She later co-starred on two short-lived 1980s sitcoms, Goodtime Girls as Loretta Smoot, and in Jennifer Slept Here featuring Ann Jillian.

Engel had a recurring role on Coach as Shirley Burleigh, and starred as the voice of Love-a-Lot Bear in The Care Bears Movie (1985). She played a good witch in a 2007 recurring role of Esmeralda on the now-defunct NBC soap opera Passions. Engel received consecutive Emmy Award nominations as outstanding guest actress in a comedy series in 2003, 2004, and 2005 for her role on Everybody Loves Raymond as Robert Barone's mother-in-law, Pat MacDougall.

Engel made her "big screen" debut in Miloš Forman's first English-language movie Taking Off (1971), playing "Margot", a performance that earned her a BAFTA nomination for best supporting actress. Her other film appearances include The Outside Man (1973), Papa Was a Preacher (1987), Signs of Life (1989), The Sweetest Thing (2002), and the made-for-TV movies The Day the Women Got Even (1980) and A Love Affair: The Eleanor and Lou Gehrig Story (1978).

She lent her distinctive voice to the animated films Open Season (2006), Open Season 2 (2008), Open Season 3 (2010) and Dr. Dolittle 2 (2001). Engel returned to her stage roots in 2006, appearing on Broadway in the musical The Drowsy Chaperone, with Sutton Foster and Edward Hibbert. She created the role of Mrs. Tottendale, which she continued to perform, leaving the Broadway production as of April 1, 2007. She was featured in the North American tour, performing in Toronto in September 2007, through engagements at the Orpheum Theater in San Francisco, in August 2008, and at the Denver Performing Arts Complex in October 2008.

For the summers of 2004, 2005, 2007, 2009, and 2010, Engel appeared in various productions at The Muny Theater in Forest Park in St. Louis, Missouri. She also appeared in Show Boat in August 2010 as Parthy. In July 2005, she appeared in Mame as Agnes Gooch, in June 2007, she appeared in Oklahoma! as Aunt Eller, and in July 2009, she appeared as Mrs. Paroo in The Music Man.

In June 2010, Engel appeared at the Ogunquit Playhouse in Ogunquit, Maine, production of The Drowsy Chaperone as Mrs. Tottendale. In October through December 2010, Engel was featured in the Vineyard Theatre's off-Broadway production of Middletown, written by Will Eno.

In 2012, she appeared in episodes of The Office as Irene, an older lady being helped by Erin Hannon (Ellie Kemper). She also appeared in two episodes of Two and a Half Men as the mother of Lyndsey McElroy, Alan's girlfriend. The character also became a lesbian lover of Alan's mom, Evelyn. In March 2012, 35 years after the close of The Mary Tyler Moore Show, Engel was reunited with Betty White in the third season of Hot in Cleveland as Mamie Sue Johnson, best friend of White's character Elka, in a recurring role.

Engel appeared in John, an Annie Baker play which opened Off-Broadway at the Signature Theatre on July 22, 2015 (previews), directed by Sam Gold. The play ran to September 6, 2015. The cast also featured Lois Smith. Engel won a 2016 Obie Award for Distinguished Performance by an Actress and was nominated for the 2016 Lucille Lortel Award, Outstanding Lead Actress in a Play for her role in this play.

Engel starred in the musical Gotta Dance, which premiered at the Bank of America Theatre, Chicago, on December 13, 2015, and ran until January 17, 2016. The cast also featured Stefanie Powers, Lillias White, and André De Shields. The musical was directed and choreographed by Jerry Mitchell, with a book by Chad Beguelin and Bob Martin, and the score by Matthew Sklar and Nell Benjamin. The musical, under the new title of Half Time, played a limited engagement at the Paper Mill Playhouse in Millburn, New Jersey. The production opened on May 31, 2018, and was scheduled to run to July 1, 2018.

== Personal life and death ==
Engel was an adherent of Christian Science. She died on April 12, 2019, at the age of 70 in Princeton, New Jersey. Her friend John Quilty told The New York Times that the cause was unknown, as Engel did not consult doctors due to her religious beliefs. She was buried at Cape Charles Cemetery in Cape Charles, Virginia.

== Filmography ==
=== Film ===
Year	Film	Role	Notes
1971	Taking Off	Margot	Nominated — BAFTA Award for Best Actress in a Supporting Role
1972	The Outside Man	Mrs. Joan Barnes	
1978	A Love Affair: The Eleanor and Lou Gehrig Story	Claire Ruth	TV film
1980	The Day the Women Got Even	Kathy Scott	TV film
1983	The Magic of Herself the Elf	Willow Song	Voice; Television special
1985	Papa Was a Preacher	'Mama' Porter	
1985	The Care Bears Movie	Love-a-Lot Bear	Voice
1989	Signs of Life	Betty	
2001	Dr. Dolittle 2	Giraffe	Voice
2002	The Sweetest Thing	Vera	
2006	Open Season	Bobbie	Voice
2006	Boog and Elliot's Midnight Bun Run	Bobbie	Voice; Short film
2007	Nunsensations	Sr. Marie Eugene	Video
2007	The Beast	Doris	TV movie
2008	Open Season 2	Bobbie	Voice
2010	Open Season 3	Bobbie	Voice
2013	Grown Ups 2	Mrs. Jayne Lamonsoff	
2016	The Family Lamp	Marsha	TV film
2018	Groomzilla	Grandma Gigi	TV film

=== Television ===
Year	Title	Role	Notes
1972–77	The Mary Tyler Moore Show	Georgette Franklin Baxter	56 episodes Nominated — Primetime Emmy Award for Outstanding Supporting Actress in a Comedy Series (1976–77)
1974	Rhoda	Georgette Franklin	1 episode: "Rhoda's Wedding"
1975	Dinah!	Herself	1 episode
1975	The Dean Martin Celebrity Roasts	Herself	1 episode S1, E26
1975	The Mike Douglas Show	Herself	3 episodes
1975–76	Tony Orlando and Dawn	Herself	3 episodes
1977	The Jacksons	Herself	1 episode
1977–78	The Betty White Show	Mitzi Maloney	14 episodes
1977–82	The Love Boat	Cleo Bagby	4 episodes
1978–83	Fantasy Island	Brenda Rappaport	5 episodes
1979	Mork & Mindy	Ambrosia Malspar	2 episodes
1980	The Associates	Wendy Turner	1 episode: "A Date with Johnny"
1980	Goodtime Girls	Loretta Smoot	13 episodes
1983–84	Jennifer Slept Here	Susan Elliot	13 episodes
1991–97	Coach	Shirley Burleigh	17 episodes
1992	Hi Honey, I'm Home!	Georgette Franklin Baxter	1 episode: "Elaine Takes a Wife"
1998	Hercules	Evelyn	2 episodes
2003–05	Everybody Loves Raymond	Pat MacDougall	13 episodes Prism Award for Best Performance in a Comedy Series (2006); Nominated — Primetime Emmy Award for Outstanding Guest Actress in a Comedy Series (2003–05)
2006	The View	Herself	1 episode
2007	Passions	Esmeralda	4 episodes
2008	The Oprah Winfrey Show	Herself	1 episode
2008	Entertainment Tonight	Herself	1 episode
2012	The Office	Irene	3 episodes
2012	Two and a Half Men	Jean	2 episodes
2012–15	Hot in Cleveland	Mamie Sue Johnson	18 episodes
2018	One Day at a Time	Sister Barbara	1 episode: "Homecoming"

== Stage ==
Year	Title	Role(s)	Venue(s)	Notes	Ref.
1969	Hello, Dolly!	Minnie Fay	St. James Theatre	Broadway debut	
1971	The House of Blue Leaves	performer	Truck and Warehouse Theater		
1983	My One and Only	Mickey	St. James Theatre		
1991	Nunsense	Sister Mary Amnesia	Bucks County Playhouse, Pocono Playhouse		
1992	Cut the Ribbons	performer	Westside Theater		
1996	Sleeping Beauty	Mme. Sophie/Fairy Godmother	The Muny		
2000	The Pajama Game	Mabel	Pittsburgh Civic Light Opera		
2000	Dear World	Gabrielle	Goodspeed Opera House		
2002	The Boys from Syracuse	Seeress	American Airlines Theatre		
2006	The Drowsy Chaperone	Mrs. Tottendale	Marquis Theatre		
2007	The Drowsy Chaperone	Mrs. Tottendale	US national tour		
2009	The Music Man	Mrs. Paroo	The Muny		
2010	High Spirits	Madame Arcati	G&L Theatre		
2010	The Drowsy Chaperone	Mrs. Tottendale	Ogunquit Playhouse		
2010	Show Boat	Parthy	The Muny		
2010	Middletown	Librarian	Vineyard Theater		
2012	Uncle Vanya	Marina	Soho Rep		
2015	John	Mertis	Signature Theatre Company	Obie Award; Drama Desk Award nomination Drama League Award nomination Lucille Lortel Award nomination	
2015	Gotta Dance	Dorothy/Dottie	Bank of America Theater		
2017	John	Mertis	American Conservatory Theater		
2017	Roman Holiday	Countess	Golden Gate Theatre		
2018	Half Time	Dorothy	Paper Mill Playhouse		
