= Redgrave Theatre, Farnham =

Former theatre in Farnham, England

Coordinates: 51.2160°N 0.7945°W

Entrance to the Redgrave Theatre in 1995

The Redgrave Theatre was a theatre in Farnham in Surrey from 1974 to 1998. The theatre, named after Sir Michael Redgrave, had regular repertory seasons and also staged a variety of plays and musical productions until financial difficulties forced it to close. Now demolished, the surrounding site is under redevelopment.

In January 2018, the Redgrave Theatre was finally approved for demolition. The theatre was demolished to make room for the "Brightwells Yard development".

== History and present day ==
A modern, purpose-built theatre designed by architect Frank Rutter, the Redgrave Theatre replaced the Castle Theatre in Farnham which had opened for Farnham Repertory Company in 1941, and which operated as a weekly repertory theatre. Eventually, Farnham Repertory Company outgrew its premises and moved to the newly built Redgrave Theatre in 1973. The first Artistic Director was Ian Mullins (1929–2014) from 1974 to 1977, followed by David Horlock from 1978 to 1979, Stephen Barry taking the position from 1982 to 1986, Patrick Sandford from 1986 to 1988, Graham Watkins from 1988 to 1994 and Roland Jaquarello from 1994 to 1995.

Located in the town's East Street, the Redgrave Theatre was given the family name of actor Sir Michael Redgrave who inaugurated the start of the theatre's construction in September 1971. Judi Dench was among the founding members. The theatre officially opened on 29 May 1974 and commenced with a production of Romeo and Juliet attended by Princess Margaret. Princess Margaret returned to the theatre in 1984 to join the celebrations surrounding the Redgrave's tenth anniversary. She watched a performance of David and Jonathan which had been specially commissioned by local playwright William Douglas-Home and which had George Waring and Sean Bean in the cast.

The Redgrave Theatre was mainly funded by the local community at a cost of £260,000 and was built in the grounds of the Grade II listed Brightwell House, which dates to the 1790s, and is attached to the house itself. Brightwell House supplied a restaurant (the Castle Restaurant) and club room, with offices and dressing rooms above. The Redgrave Theatre was built with an orchestra pit for 10 musicians and with a stage equipped with a permanent revolve. The auditorium was a plain concrete structure, fan shaped in a single rake. The theatre's foyer was extended in 1986 but facilities were limited.

Among those who appeared at the theatre were Zoë Wanamaker, Stephen Mangan, Fiona Fullerton, Prunella Scales, Tom Watt, Sandra Payne, Philippa Urquhart, David McAlister, Christopher Cazenove, Angharad Rees, Lisa Bowerman, George Waring, Sean Bean, Ian Bartholomew, Stephanie Turner, Gareth Thomas, Christopher Timothy, Maureen Lipman, James Bolam, Bernard Holley, David Hargreaves, Jack McKenzie, Simon Callow, William Gaunt and Rachel Kempson, the widow of Sir Michael Redgrave.

The theatre company Cheek by Jowl premiered its production of As You Like It at the theatre in July 1991 before a run at the Lyric Theatre in Hammersmith. A 1991 production of The Seven Descents of Myrtle at the Redgrave starring Kit Hollerbach as Myrtle and Stephen Hattersley as Chicken led to Hattersley winning Best Actor 1991 in the TMA Awards for his performance.

In 1981, the Redgrave Theatre staged the first revival of Noël Coward's Cavalcade in a production directed by David Horlock (1942–1990) and with a cast of 12 professional actors and 300 amateur performers. The production was filmed by the BBC and shown in 1982 as a two-part documentary, Cavalcade – A Backstage Story.

Present day

As of March 2019, the theatre is in the process of being demolished, this is to make way for the "Brightwells yard development”

Whilst numerous attempts of protest was made to stop the theatre being demolished, it was eventually approved and the demolition is so far successful.

== Neglect ==
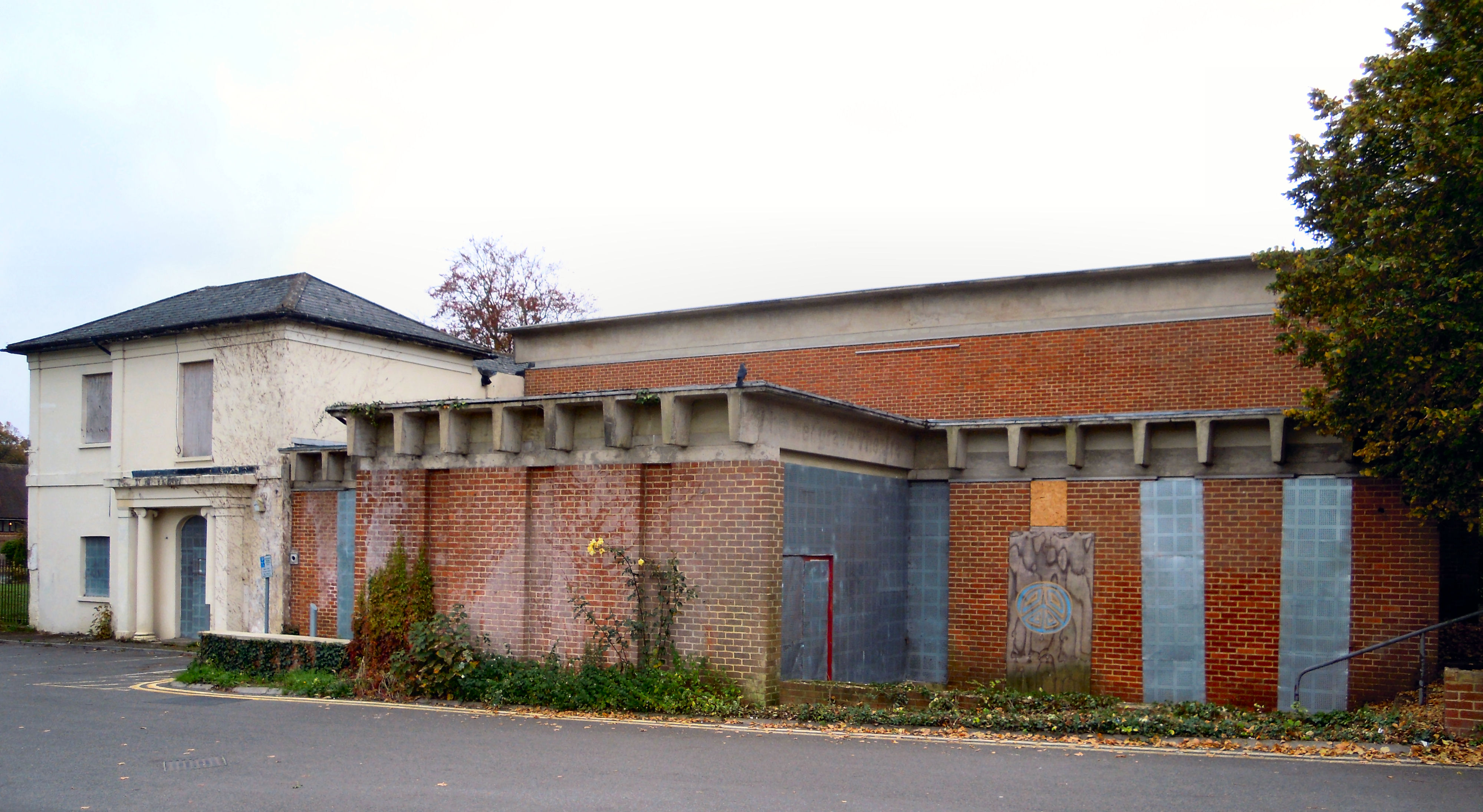
The theatre entrance in 2016

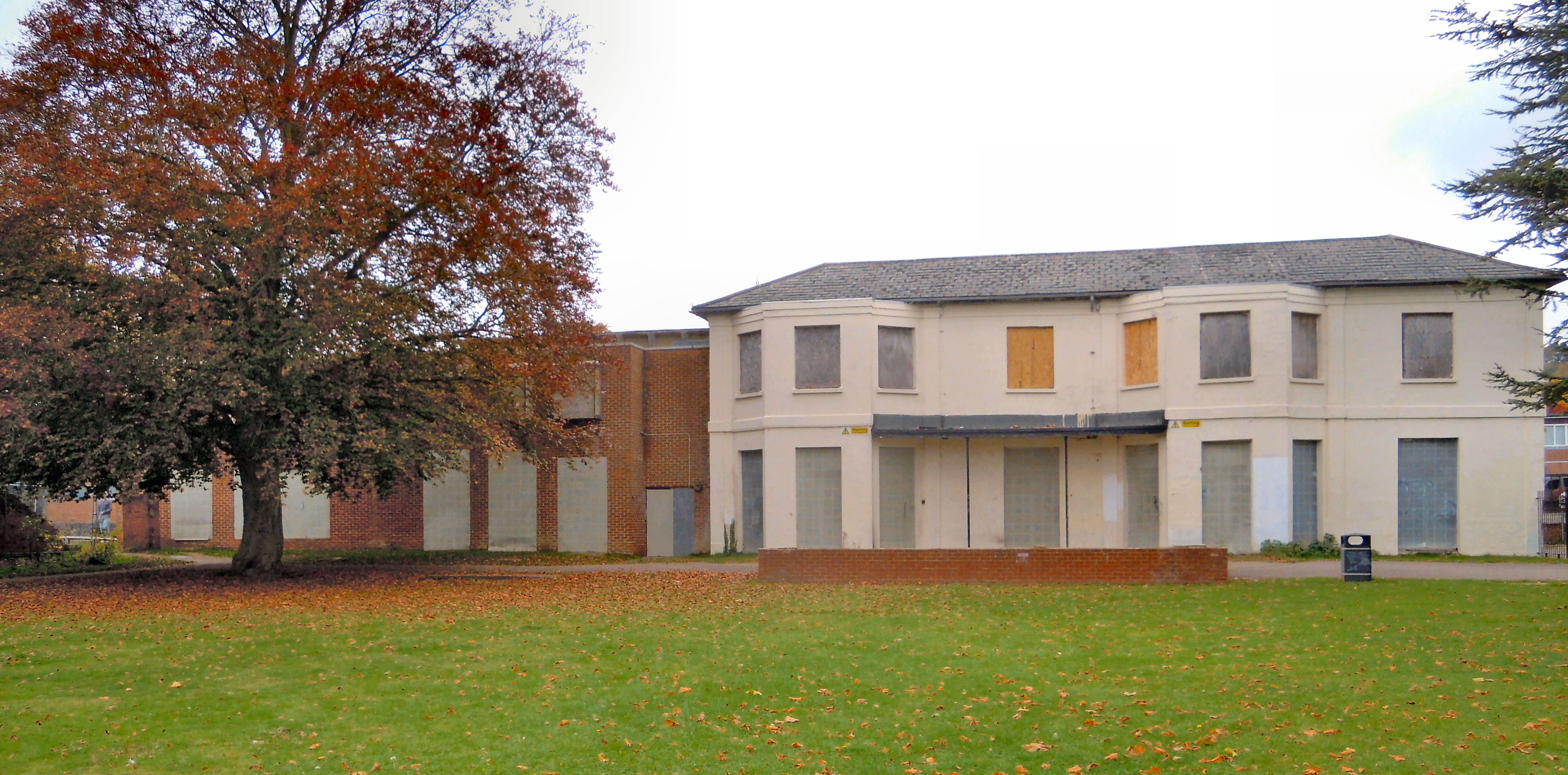
The derelict Redgrave Theatre (left) and Brightwell House (right) in 2016

By the 1990s interest in repertory theatre had declined and after closing down completely for a period Waverley Borough Council took over the theatre and began to show films and to stage plays which did not appeal to local audiences. Roland Jaquarello was appointed Artistic Director in 1994 but he was only able to direct one season, the "incomprehensible" The Playboy of the Western World, a commercial failure, before the theatre "went dark", temporarily closing in January 1995. Having endured long-term underfunding with a smaller than average subsidy, the theatre made large financial losses during its final years and in 1998 the Council decided to permanently close the theatre and to demolish the building and develop the area. The Farnham Theatre Association (FTA) campaigned to either save the theatre or have a similar venue built in the town. The proposed developer of the East Street site, Crest Nicholson, has said the scheme will help to revitalise an under-used part of the area and will see the creation of more than 200 homes and more than 800 new jobs.

Full planning permission to develop the Brightwell House site was granted in 2008 in a scheme that included 239 residential units, a multi-screen cinema, together with retail and restaurant units. Listed building consent to demolish the Redgrave Theatre had been granted on two previous occasions, and both times it expired without implementation. In January 2015, permission was again given by Waverley Borough Council for the demolition of the theatre and conversion of Brightwell House, but campaigners again objected. The actor Simon Callow, who had appeared at the theatre, lent his support to the campaign to save it.
