= Gotta Dance =

- Movie poster
- Directed by: Dori Berinstein
- Starring: The NJ NETSationals
- Music by: Craig Sharmat
- Release date: 2008
- Running time: 93 minutes
- Country: United States
- Language: English

Gotta Dance is a 2008 documentary film and Tribeca Film Festival Audience Award Finalist directed by Dori Berinstein. The film "chronicles the debut of the New Jersey Nets' first-ever senior hip-hop dance team, 12 women and 1 man - all dance team newbies, from auditions through to performance.”

== Plot synopsis ==
Gotta Dance documents the creation of the New Jersey Nets basketball team's senior citizen dance troupe, The NJ NETSationals. The Nets franchise already employed a professional dance team, a cheerleading squad, and a kids dance team, but in 2007 they added the NJ NETSationals to their entertainment family. "Essentially, the New Jersey Nets basketball team came up with a PR stunt that includes forming a hip-hop dance crew made up entirely of senior citizens (or folks over the age of 60)."

Filmmaker Dori Berinstein followed and filmed as they recruited, auditioned, and trained the NETSationals. The team members range in age from 59 to 80 years old and come from varied backgrounds. The film documents not only the NETSationals rehearsals, but also includes personal information about each of the team members, as well as lively team dinners. During the film the NETSationals, debut at a halftime show to an ecstatic and astonished Meadowlands crowd.

"Two of the oldest recruits have granddaughters on the Nets' professional dance team, and the interaction between the highly athletic younger women and their less flexible elders offers some particularly poignant moments, as does the final half-time show incorporating a cute faceoff with a kids' dancing troupe."

== Miscellaneous ==
The film premiered at the 2008 Tribeca Film Festival.

Royal Caribbean Cruise Lines sponsored a Gotta Dance program on some cruises which began with a screening of the film and the opportunity for guests to perform routines choreographed by a member of the New Jersey Nets Dance Coach. It also spawned the Gotta Dance Slide, and a social networking site for seniors, GottaDanceWithUs.com, were all inspired by the film.

== Adaptation ==
A stage musical has been written, with the book by Chad Beguelin and Bob Martin, music by Matthew Sklar and lyrics by Nell Benjamin. Additional music is by Marvin Hamlisch. Directed and choreographed by Jerry Mitchell, the cast featured Lillias White, André De Shields, Georgia Engel, Haven Burton, Lori Tan Chinn, Jonalyn Saxer and Stefanie Powers. The musical premiered at the Bank of America Theatre in Chicago on December 13, 2015, running through January 17, 2016. It had been expected to open on Broadway in the Fall of 2016. However, the producers announced on July 13, 2016 that the musical would open on Broadway in the Spring of 2017, and that the musical has a new title, Half Time. They further announced that Ester Dean has written a new finale with the composers. It was later announced the show, under the new title, will instead play a limited engagement at the Paper Mill Playhouse in Millburn, New Jersey. Engel, De Shields and White return to the cast with new cast member Donna McKechnie, as well as director/choreographer Mitchell. The production opened on May 31, and is scheduled until July 1, 2018.

The co-producer of the musical, Dori Berinstein, said that the musical "is not intended to be a precise documentation of the NETSational Seniors, nor a staging of the film...The charge for the bookwriters, Chad Beguelin and Bob Martin, and the composer, Matthew Sklar, ... was to write a story inspired by the real NETSational Seniors, whose exploits have been copied by numerous other NBA teams." Co-producer Bill Damaschke added "the central charge involved understanding that the NETSational Seniors could become a collective metaphor 'for the idea that age does not matter.' "

== Awards ==
2008 Tribeca Film Festival Audience Award Finalist
2009 Seattle International Film Festival Official Selection
2009 Palm Beach Film Festival Audience Award Best Documentary Winner
2009 Sarasota Film Festival Official Selection
2008 The Floating Film Festival Best Documentary Winner
2009 Cinequest Film Festival Official Selection
2009 Phoenix Film Festival Official Selection
2008 Williamstown Film Festival Official Selection
2009 International Film Festival of Aging Official Selection
