= Domesticated (play) =

2013 play by Bruce Norris

Domesticated is a 2013 comic-drama play from Bruce Norris. The play follows politician Bill Pulvar and his wife Judy as they navigate a sex scandal.

== Production history ==
The play was commissioned by the Lincoln Center.

=== Premiere ===
The play debuted in New York at the Mitzi Newhouse Theater, directed by Anna D. Shapiro. It starred Jeff Goldblum as Bill, opposite Laurie Metcalf as Judy. Critics praised the performances of Goldblum and Metcalf, as well as the direction and staging of the play. The following year, the show was nominated for two Lucille Lortel Awards recognising Norris for Outstanding Play and Metcalf for Outstanding Lead Actress in a Play. The play also received three 2014 Drama Desk Awards, including Outstanding Play, and Outstanding Actress in a Play (for Metcalf), and Outstanding Director of a Play (for Shapiro).

=== Steppenwolf Theatre Company ===
The play opened in Chicago in 2015, performed by the Steppenwolf Theatre Company, and directed by Norris, the author.

=== Canadian premiere ===
Toronto's The Company Theatre (TCT) brought Domesticated to Canadian Stage's Berkeley Street Theatre in 2015 for the production's Canadian premiere. A co-production between TCT and Canadian Stage, the play was directed by TCT's co-Artistic Director Philip Riccio.

Domesticated saw TCT's largest cast since their 2009 production of Festen. Completing the cast were returning TCT ensemble members Maria Vacratsis, Sarah Dodd, as well as newcomers Torri Higginson, Nicola Lipman, Salvatore Antonio, Akosua Amo-Adem, Kelly Mcnamee, Vanessa Smythe and Abigail Pew.

The creative team was composed of set designer Nick Blais, lighting designer Kevin Lamotte, sound designer Thomas Ryder Payne, costume designer Ming Wong and projection designer Cameron Davis. Rounding out the team was returning TCT stage manager Michael Sinclair, in his third production with the company.

== Reception ==
The play received mostly positive reviews for its humor and introspective treatment of gender issues, with some criticism for repetitiveness and a lack of development in its second act. Ben Brantley of The New York Times gave the play a mixed review, saying that "you grasp the basic argument so early that you start to feel that the play doesn’t really develop as it goes along; it just gets louder."
