= Roland Jaquarello =

British director

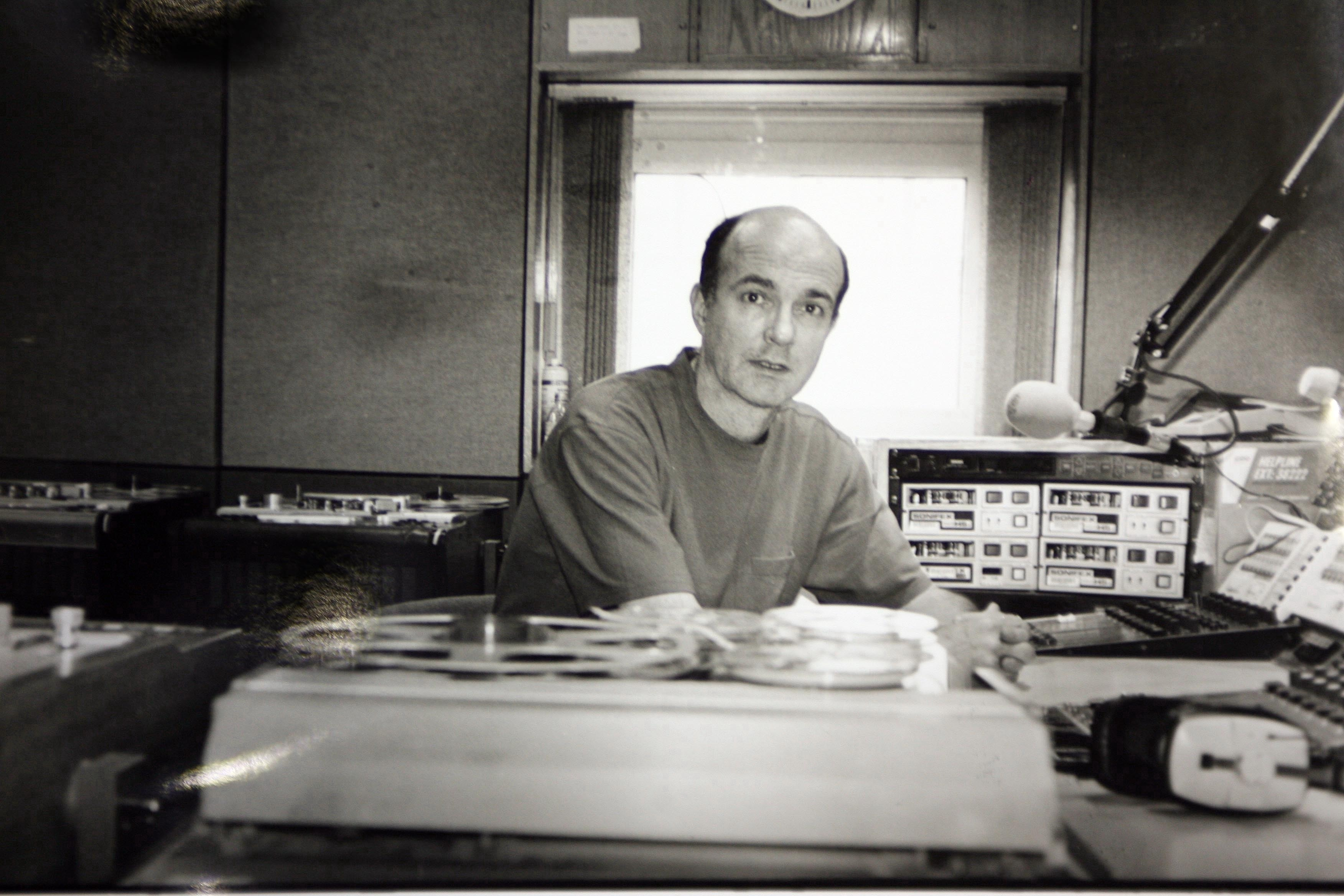
Roland Jaquarello

Roland Jaquarello, born 14 December 1945, is a British Theatre Director and Radio Director/Producer. He started his career in Dublin Theatre Festival after graduating from Trinity College Dublin in 1968. Since then he has directed over 80 theatre and 60 radio productions in the UK and Ireland.

== The 1960s ==
In 1969 he was assistant director to Lindsay Anderson on David Storey's The Contractor at The Royal Court Theatre, London. He then went on to direct the successful Irish production of It's a 2'6" Above The Ground World by Kevin Laffan, a comedy about birth control, which ran for over a year as well as the Irish premieres of two plays by Joe Orton, Loot with Donal McCann as Inspector Truscott and What The Butler Saw. During this period, he showed his interest in European drama by directing Police, the first Irish production of the Polish playwright Sławomir Mrożek's comic satire on political power.

== The Abbey Theatre Dublin ==
In the early 1970s, at the age of 26, one of the few British theatre practitioners to become a resident Director at the Abbey Theatre Dublin. While there, his productions included Richard Brinsley Sheridan's classic comedy of manners The School for Scandal, the witty Shavian drama, King Herod Advises by Conor Cruise O'Brien, the premiere of Hatchet, a play about violence in working class Dublin by Heno Magee, and Irish premieres of continental writers Fernando Arrabal and Michel De Ghelderode.

== Half Moon Theatre London ==
He later successfully redirected Hatchet, regarded as one of the best Irish plays of that period at Half Moon Theatre, London, with Colm Meaney in the title role.

== The Welsh Drama Company Cardiff ==
In the mid-1970s he ran an enterprising season for the Welsh Drama Company at The Sherman Theatre, Cardiff where he directed productions of August Strindberg's Miss Julie, Bertolt Brecht's The Exception and the Rule and Fernando Arrabal's The Car Cemetery.

== Green Fields and Far Away ==
From 1977 to 1981, he ran his own touring company Green Fields and Far Away. It was the first company of its kind in Britain. Based in London, the company produced 12 productions of Irish and Irish-related work and toured the UK. It also toured Ireland and its production of Jack Doyle – The Man Who Boxed Like John McCormack! by Ian McPherson, about the celebrated Irish boxer and entertainer, featured at the Lyric Hammersmith, London in the 1980 'A Sense of Ireland' Festival. The company produced work by writers Desmond Hogan, Leigh Jackson (who wrote a specially commissioned play about Erskine Childers, English author, turned Irish patriot), James McKenna, James Pettifer and Bryan MacMahon. Actors like Brid Brennan, Liam Neeson, Michael Loughnan, John O'Toole, Patch Connolly, David Haig, Robert O'Mahoney and Kevin Wallace were among those who worked for the company. Green Fields and Far Away received an Irish Post Award for its work in 1981 and an insightful documentary film about the company, directed by John Lynch, was transmitted on RTÉ.

== Live Theatre Company Newcastle and The Group ==
During the 80s, he also worked as artistic director of Live Theatre Company, Newcastle, England where he expanded the repertoire to include Graham Reid's The Death of Humpty Dumpty, a powerful play about how a Belfast family deals with a father becoming a paraplegic as a result of sectarian violence. Later, during the same period, he also founded The Group with actor Tim Woodward. The company presented a series of rarely performed European and American plays in London fringe venues. The work included plays by Luigi Pirandello, Ernst Toller, Fernando Arrabal, Michel De Ghelderode and Howard Fast. John McEnery, Ray Winstone, Catherine Harrison, Mark Drewry and Tim Woodward were among those actors who performed for the company.

== The Young Vic ==
Between productions for The Group, he also directed the revival of Tom Kempinski's play about soldiers in Northern Ireland – Flashpoint at The Young Vic.

== Lyric Theatre Belfast ==
From 1988 to 1991, Roland Jaquarello was artistic director of The Lyric Theatre Belfast. During his tenure, four new plays by Robin Glendinning, Christina Reid, John McLelland and Robert Ellison were produced. There was also the premiere of a 'glasnost' play Threshold by Alexei Dudarev which was directed and designed by a visiting Belarusian team. During this time, The Lyric Theatre also visited The Glasgow Mayfest with his production of Sam Thompson's Over The Bridge, a play about sectarianism in the Belfast shipyards. They also visited The International Ibsen Festival in Oslo, Norway with Ghosts and instigated a new Summer Festival presenting work by international writers such as Václav Havel and the Argentinian playwright Eduardo Pavlovsky. Innovative classical revivals of Sean O' Casey's The Plough and the Stars, Oscar Wilde's The Importance of Being Earnest with Conleth Hill as Algernon and J. M. Synge's 'The Playboy of the Western World' were also produced. However at the centre of his progressive artistic leadership were his own ambitious productions of three American classics: After the Fall by Arthur Miller, with Tim Woodward and Claire Hackett giving memorable performances in the leading roles, The Iceman Cometh with Peter Marinker as a fine Hickey and Cat on a Hot Tin Roof with strong performances from Sara Stewart as Maggie and Patrick O'Kane as Brick.

== Druid Theatre Galway ==
In 1991, he directed a well received production of Cheapside by David Allen at the Druid Theatre, Galway, about the rivalry between Shakespeare and his contemporary Robert Greene.

== Redgrave Theatre, Farnham ==
In the mid-1990s he was artistic director of the Redgrave Theatre in Farnham, for a season. He directed J. M Synge's The Playboy of the Western World, Molière's George Dandin and produced George Bernard Shaw's Mrs. Warren's Profession and Neil Duffield's adaptation of Rudyard Kipling's The Jungle Book.

== BBC Radio Drama ==
In 1996 he became senior producer for Radio Drama at BBC Northern Ireland. He worked in Belfast for three years in broadcasting and then turned freelance, basing himself in London. His productions include work for BBC Radio 4 and 3 by experienced writers like John Arden, Brian Friel, Sebastian Barry, Mark Lawson, Gary Mitchell, Carlo Gébler, Robin Glendinning, Christopher Fitz-Simon, Christina Reid, Jonathan Myerson and Larry Gelbart, writer of TV's M*A*S*H. He also produced and directed William Trevor's The Property of Colette Nervi, which was nominated for the Prix Italia Play Section, 1999, and Martin Lynch's modern Belfast version of Henrik Ibsen's An Enemy of the People. The latter won a ZeBBie Award for Best Radio Script 2007 from the Irish Playwrights and Screenwriters Guild. A Whistle in the Dark by Tom Murphy, which he produced and directed for BBC Radio 3, also won a ZeBBie Award from the same guild for Best Radio Script 2011.

Colum McCann, Kaite O'Reilly and Rob John are among other talented writers he has helped to develop in radio drama.

Roland Jaquarello has also expanded his work in broadcasting by producing music documentaries on Van Morrison, Joni Mitchell, Mel Tormé and Marlon Brando for BBC Radio 2.

== Recent Irish Theatre ==
Despite working in radio he continues to direct for the theatre. His recent productions include two Irish plays performed in Belfast and a tour:The Butterfly of Killybegs by Brian Foster, a comic play, set in the 1960s, about a young woman trying to grow up against the background of a suffocating invalid mother and an oppressive rural town and New York State of Mind by Sam McCready, a play about an Irish actor trying to succeed in America while leaving his roots and family behind.

== Giant Steps ==
In 2008 Roland Jaquarello founded his own company Giant Steps which produced ‘Enduring Freedom’ by Anders Lustgarten, a play, which dramatised how the personal and political legacy of the post 9/11 orthodoxy affected a New Jersey couple. He directed the production which was designed by Vanessa Hawkins. Vincent Riotta and Lisa Eichorn played the leading roles. Fiz Marcus, Charlie Roe and Anna Savva completed the strong cast.

In 2013 Giant Steps produced Where The Shot Rabbits Lay by Brad Birch at The White Bear Theatre London. The play explores the relationship between a father and his son after a fractious divorce and what happened when they went on a trip together. Roland Jaquarello directed the production, Andy Robinson was the designer and Roger Simonsz the lighting designer. Peter Warnock who played The Man and Richard Linnell who was The Boy were praised for their performances.

== Books ==
In 2016 Roland Jaquarello's book, 'Memories of Development: My Times in Irish Theatre and Broadcasting' was published by the Liffey Press. The Irish Independent described it as an 'honest account of a life in theatre in politically challenging times', while The Irish News said it showed 'a great insight to those years...which he records with humour and detail.'

In 2017, he diversified and his book 'Being Fulham' about Fulham Football Club's journey to the 2016-17 Championship play-offs, was published and praised by many fans.
