= Shakespeare by the Sea, Newfoundland =

Theatre festival in St. John's, Newfoundland and Labrador, Canada

Shakespeare by the Festival Inc.
- Genre: Arts Festival
- Dates: May to August
- Locations: St. John's, Newfoundland, Canada
- Years active: 1993–present
- Founded: 1993
- People: Mallory Fisher (2021); Paul Rowe (2018-2021); Ian Campbell (2015-2017); Jennifer Deon (1995-2014)

The Shakespeare by the Sea Festival is an annual event that runs throughout the months of July and August in St. John's, Newfoundland and Labrador, Canada that presents outdoor productions of the plays of William Shakespeare, as well as pieces related to the province and culture.

The Festival is under the governance of Shakespeare by the Sea Festival Inc., a community-based, charitable organization that produces and promotes artistic works with a focus on William Shakespeare.

The company mounts site-specific productions in a variety of venues that may change from season to season.

Shakespeare by the Sea, Newfoundland is listed as a Major Festival in the book Shakespeare Festivals Around the World by Marcus D. Gregio (Editor), 2004.

== History ==
The company was founded in 1993 by Aiden Flynn and Danielle Irvine, and was under the artistic direction of Jennifer (Jenn) Deon from 1995 to 2014. Ian Campbell served as artistic director from 2015 to 2017. Paul Rowe took up the artistic director role in 2018 and the festival instituted a General Manager role for the first time. The General Manager position is currently filled by Sandra Mills.

The Shakespeare by the Sea Festival is the longest running outdoor summer theatre event in the St. John's area and celebrated its 25th season in 2017. Since 1993, the Festival has been performing the works of Shakespeare all around the St. John's area. In addition to works by the Bard, the festival also strives to produce works that highlight the province of Newfoundland and Labrador. An original piece, "The Curious Case in the Colony" was written by local playwright Chris Hibbs, and sees Sherlock Holmes and John Watson visit the once British colony to solve a mystery. Celebrated storyteller and musician Kelly Russell (musician) has also performed a one-man show in partnership with the festival. In 2020, because of the COVID-19 pandemic, the festival instituted their first "virtual" festival, consisting of a virtual reading of 'Pericles: Prince of Tyre', and a series of recorded short scenes called 'Shakespeare Shorts'. The festival returned to in person performances in 2021 with a physical re-mount of "Pericles: Prince of Tyre" as they originally envisioned, with additional writing by Andy Jones. The same year, Mallory Fisher took over the artistic director title.

Shakespeare by the Sea Festival Inc. is a registered charity (No. 891781841RR0001) with the Canada Revenue Agency and is a member of the Shakespeare Theatre Association and the Institute of Outdoor Drama.

== Past productions ==
1993 The Tempest
1994 King Lear
1995 Twelfth Night
1996 Macbeth and Romeo & Juliet
1997 Macbeth, Hamlet, I Hate Hamlet and Rosencrantz & Guildenstern Are Dead
1998 A Midsummer Night's Dream
1999 Much Ado About Nothing and Richard III
2000 The Mousetrap, Julius Caesar (play), Love's Labour's Lost
2001 Dial M for Murder, Two Gentlemen of Verona, The Merchant of Venice and A Streetcar Named Desire (play)
2002 The Tempest and Twelfth Night
2003 The Importance of Being Earnest, Othello, Romeo & Juliet, The Cask of Amontillado and The Compleat Works of Wllm Shkspr (Abridged)
2004 As You Like It and The Winter's Tale
2005 Henry V (play)
2006 The Two Noble Kinsmen, A Midsummer Night's Dream and Dear Brutus
2007 Macbeth, The Comedy of Errors and The Rats in the Walls / The Cask of Amontillado
2008 Macbeth
2008 Merry Wives of Windsor, Much Ado About Nothing, Anthony and Cleopatra, and The Rats in the Walls / The Cask of Amontillado
2009 The Tempest, Romeo & Juliet, The Tell-Tale Heart / The Cask of Amontillado / The Signal-Man, The Tunes and Tales of Newfoundland, and Fairy Tale Mix-Up
2010 Love's Labour's Lost, Troilus & Cressida, The Compleat Works of Wllm Shkspr (Abridged), Fairy Tale Mix-Up, The Tunes and Tales of Newfoundland, and The Rats in the Walls / The Signal-Man, The Cask of Amontillado
2011 Hamlet, Twelfth Night, Above and Below, The Curious Case of the Colony: A Sherlock Holmes Adventure, and The Tunes and Tales of Newfoundland
2012 King Lear, A Midsummer Night's Dream, The Curious Case of the Colony: A Sherlock Holmes Adventure, and Above and Below.
2013 Harvey, Julius Caesar, Cymbeline, The Curious Case of the Colony: A Sherlock Holmes Adventure, Shake It Up!, Tunes and Tales with Kelly Russell
2014 The Taming of the Shrew, All's Well that Ends Well, The Curious Case of the Colony: A Sherlock Holmes Adventure, Shake It Up!, Tunes and Tales with Kelly Russell, Shylock
2015 The Comedy of Errors, Two "Great Shakespearean Walking Tours" - Scenes from Britain, and The Course of True Love, The Curious Case of the Colony: A Sherlock Holmes Adventure, Shake It Up!, Tunes and Tales with Kelly Russell
2016 Richard III, A Midsummer Night's Dream, Salt-Water Moon, Shake It Up!, Tunes and Tales with Kelly Russell
2017 The Tempest, Timon of Athens, Soldier's Heart, Shake It Up!, Tunes and Tales with Kelly Russell
2018 As You Like It, Shake It Up!, Tunes and Tales with Kelly Russell
2019 Macbeth, The Comedy of Errors, Tunes and Tales with Kelly Russell
2020 Pericles, Prince of Tyre (virtual presentation), Shakespeare Shorts
2021 Pericles, Prince of Tyre (in-person performance), Depths of Desire: Have you reached the bottom yet (original virtual production, Tunes and Tales with Kelly Russell
2022 Coriolanus, The Cherry Orchard
2023 Much Ado About Nothing, Romeo and Juliet, Picnic in the Backyard
2024 The Winter's Tale, Twelfth Night
