= Lukas Bärfuss =

Swiss writer and playwright

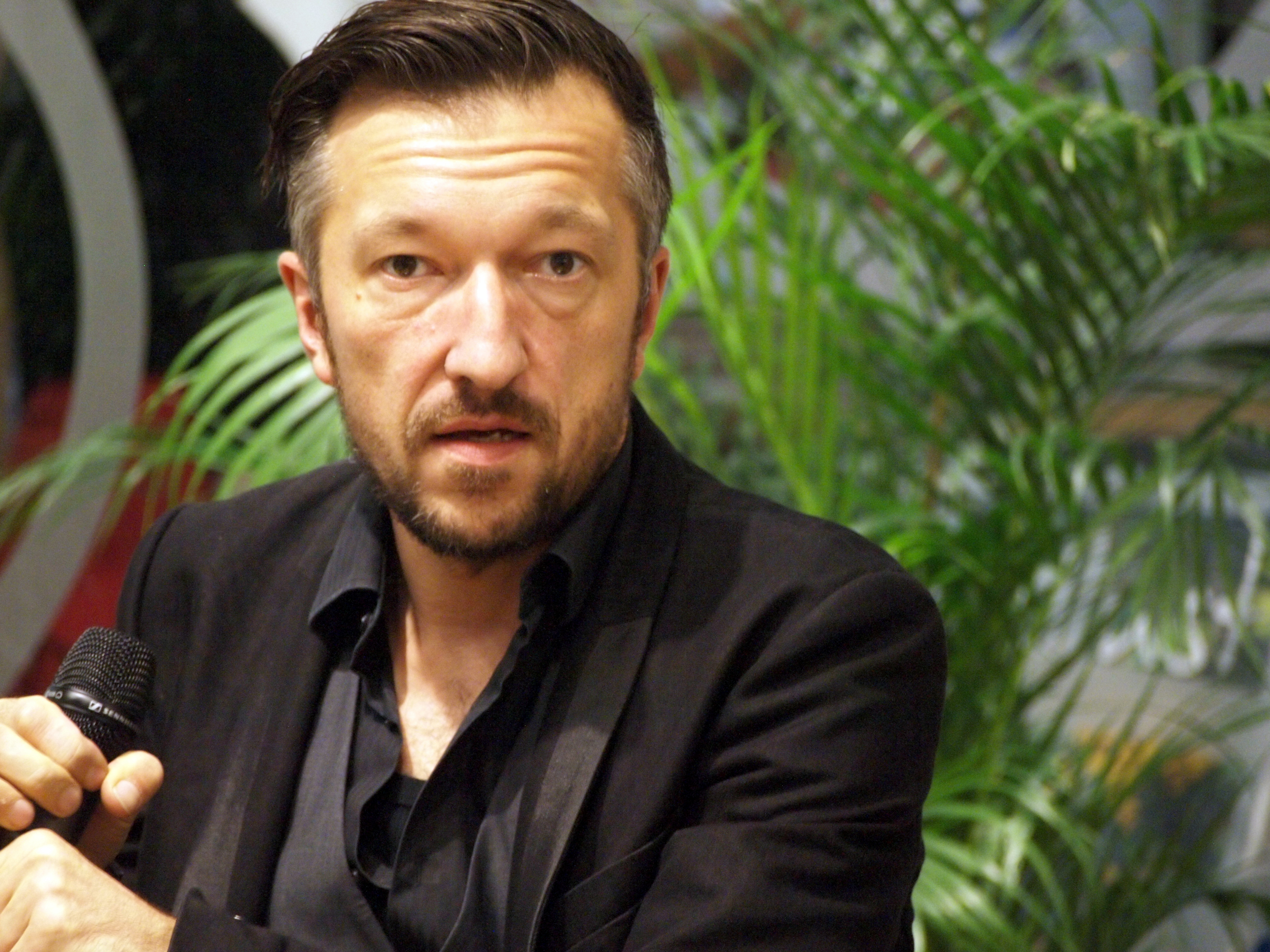
- Bärfuss in 2014
- Born: 30 December 1971 (age 54); Thun, Switzerland
- Occupations: Playwright, novelist
- Writing career
- Language: German
- Website: www.lukasbaerfuss.ch

Lukas Bärfuss (born 30 December 1971) is a Swiss writer and playwright who writes in German. He won the Georg Büchner Prize in 2019.

== Biography ==
Born in Thun, Switzerland on 30 December 1971, Lukas Bärfuss began training as a bookseller after graduating from high school. In 1998, he co-founded the independent theater group 400asa.

== Awards ==
Bärfuss has won the Mülheimer Dramatikerpreis in 2005 for the play Der Bus (Das Zeug einer Heiligen), the Anna Seghers-Preis in 2008, the Hans Fallada Prize in 2010, the Solothurner Literaturpreis in 2014, the Swiss Book Prize (German: Schweizer Buchpreis) in 2014 for Koala, the Nicolas Born Prize in 2015 and the Johann-Peter-Hebel-Preis in 2016.

In 2019, he was awarded the Georg Büchner Prize for his dramas, novels and essays. The Deutsche Akademie für Sprache und Dichtung praised his work, among other things, as being permeated by "a high degree of stylistic certainty and formal richness of variation" that explores "always anew and differently fundamental existential situations of modern life." The prize was awarded in Darmstadt on 2 November 2019. The Georg Büchner Prize is regarded as the most prestigious prize in German literature. Bärfuss was the fourth Swiss to win the Prize and the first Swiss winner in 25 years, the last Swiss winner being Adolf Muschg in 1994.

=== Memberships ===
Bärfuss has been a member of the Deutsche Akademie für Sprache und Dichtung since early summer 2015.

== Works ==
=== Plays ===
- Sophokles' Ödipus (1998)
- Siebzehn Uhr Siebzehn (2000)
- 74 Sekunden (2000)
- Vier Frauen (2000)
- Die Reise von Klaus und Edith durch den Schacht zum Mittelpunkt der Erde (2001)
- Meienbergs Tod (2001)
- Vier Bilder der Liebe (2002)
- Die sexuellen Neurosen unserer Eltern (2003)
- Der Bus (Das Zeug einer Heiligen) (2005)
- Alices Reise in die Schweiz (2005)
- Die Probe (Der brave Simon Korach) (2007)
- Amygdala (2009)
- Öl (2009)
- Malaga (2010)
- Zwanzigtausend Seiten (2012)
- Die schwarze Halle (2013)
- Frau Schmitz (2016)
- Der Elefantengeist (2018)
- Julien – Rot und Schwarz (2020)
- Verführung (2023)
- Einsiedler Welttheater (2024)
- Sex mit Ted Cruz (2025)

=== Books ===
- Die toten Männer. Frankfurt am Main: Suhrkamp Verlag. 2002. ISBN 978-3-518-12306-5.
- Hundert Tage. Göttingen: Wallstein Verlag. 2008. ISBN 978-3-8353-0271-6.
  - Hundert Tage. Munich: btb Verlag. 2010. ISBN 978-3-442-73903-5.
- Koala. Göttingen: Wallstein. 2014. ISBN 978-3-8353-0653-0.
- Stil und Moral. Göttingen: Wallstein. 2015. ISBN 978-3-8353-1679-9.
- Hagard. Göttingen: Wallstein. 2017. ISBN 978-3-8353-1840-3.
- Krieg und Liebe. Göttingen: Wallstein. 2018. ISBN 978-3-8353-3241-6.
- Contact. with Michael Günzburger. Zürich: Edition Patrick Frey. 2018. ISBN 978-3-906803-59-3.
- Malinois. Göttingen: Wallstein. 2019. ISBN 978-3-8353-3600-1.
- Die Krone der Schöpfung. Essays. Göttingen: Wallstein. 2020. ISBN 978-3-8353-3831-9.
- Vaters Kiste. Eine Geschichte über das Erben. Hamburg: Rowohlt. 2022. ISBN 978-3-498-00341-8.
- Die Krume Brot. Hamburg: Rowohlt. 2023. ISBN 978-3-498-00320-3.
