= Festen (play) =

2004 stage adaptation by David Eldridge

Festen is a British stage adaptation of the 1998 Danish film of the same name (The Celebration being the film's release title in North America). The adaptation is by English playwright David Eldridge. It was first staged in 2004 by producer Marla Rubin at the Almeida Theatre in London, and has since been staged in many countries around the world.

== Synopsis ==
As in the original movie, Festen satirises the hypocrisy of a large and wealthy family by observing the events that unfold at the ancestral home during a reunion held to celebrate the oldest family member's 60th birthday.

As the time arises for birthday speeches to be made to the party's subject, one of his sons stands and asks the assembled guests to choose which of two prepared speeches he should read. The guests select one not knowing its contents, and the son declares it the "truth speech". As he begins to talk, it becomes dramatically clear that he is not praising his father but accusing him of having sexually abused him and his sister, who committed suicide shortly before the events, during their childhood. The rest of the story traces the family's turbulent battle with the truth to discover whether the son's cold rage is justified or the product of a deranged imagination.

== London productions ==
Festen premiered at the Almeida Theatre in London and ran until 1 May 2004 before transferring to the Lyric Theatre. It was directed by Rufus Norris, designed by Ian MacNeil and co-produced in the West End by Marla Rubin and Bill Kenwright. The production then went on a four-month tour throughout the UK. Festen has gone on to be produced around the world in countries including Australia, Greece, Ireland, Mexico & South Africa.

In a review of the Almeida production, The Stage noted that in the conversion from a film to a stage version, the story had "lost little of its power to shock and enthral in its transfer to the West End." A BBC London reviewer described the play as "one of the most powerful, poignant and overwhelming evenings I've ever spent in the theatre."

The West End production ran from 15 September 2004 until 9 April 2005.

== New York production ==
The U.S. production ran at the Music Box Theatre on Broadway from 23 March until 9 April 2006.

The production retained director Norris, designer McNeil and co-producers Kenwright and Rubin, but was recast with American actors.

== Toronto production ==
In 2008, Toronto's The Company Theatre (TCT) mounted the Canadian premiere of the play at Canadian Stage's Berkeley Street Theatre. The production was directed by TCT ensemble member, Irish director Jason Byrne, and starred veteran stage and screen actor Eric Peterson as family patriarch and businessman Helge Klingenfeldt. The balance of the cast was made up of a mix of TCT alumni and newcomers:

- Rosemary Dunsmore as Elsa
- Nicholas Campbell as Poul
- Philip Riccio as Christian
- Allan Hawco as Michael
- Tara Rosling as Helene
- Caroline Cave as Mette
- Richard Clarkin as Helmut
- Earl Pastko as Lars
- Milton Barnes as Gbatokai
- Gray Powell as Kim
- Alex Paxton-Beesley as Pia
- Gary Reineke as Grandfather
- Isabella Lobo as Little Girl

The creative team was composed of stage manager Robert Harding, set and costume designer John Thompson, lighting designer Andrea Lundy and sound designer Michael Laird. All four team members had previously worked on a TCT production, with Harding, Lundy and Laird all working on the company's debut production, A Whistle in the Dark (2005), and Harding, Thompson and Laird taking part in Marion Bridge (2007).

The play ran at the Berkeley Street Theatre from 20 November through 13 December 2008, with previews beginning 17 November. The production received the nomination at the 2009 Dora Mavor Moore Awards in the Independent Theatre category: Outstanding Production of a Play, Outstanding Direction of a Play (Byrne) and Outstanding Performance by a Male in a Principal Role (Riccio).

== Awards ==
The London production was nominated for five Olivier Awards in 2005. It also won both the Evening Standard and Critics Circle Best Director Awards and the Evening Standard Best Designer award, in addition to the Whatsonstage Theatregoer's Choice Award for Best New Play.
