= LSPU Hall =

Coordinates: 47.56613°N 52.706491°W

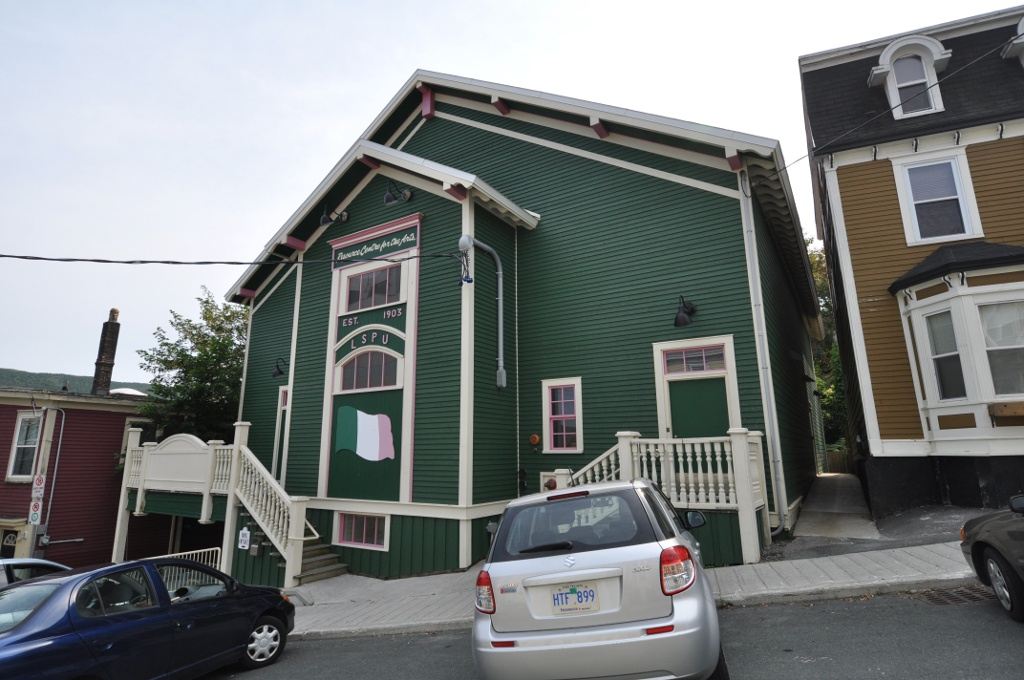
Front of LSPU Hall

The LSPU Hall is a large wooden structure in St. John's, Newfoundland and Labrador. Located on 3 Victoria Street, it is currently the home of the Resource Centre for the Arts (RCA). The name comes from a previous owner, the Longshoremen's Protective Union (not to be confused with the Fisherman's Protective Union). The Hall is a registered heritage building.

In its mission statement the Resource Centre for the Arts states that it "aims to provide accessible, supportive and well-resourced programs and venues, with a primary focus on the creation, development, and advancement of the performing arts in Newfoundland and Labrador".

Many prominent artists from Newfoundland and Labrador have performed at the Hall, including Mary Walsh, Andy Jones, Rick Mercer, Bob Joy, Jillian Keiley, Allan Hawco and Danielle Irvine.

== History ==
The LSPU Hall is on the site of "the first Congregationalist Church in Newfoundland" that was built in 1789. After that was destroyed by the Great Fire of 1817, a meeting hall was built on the site, which was purchased by the Sons of Temperance in 1853. This meeting hall was destroyed by the Great Fire of 1892 and rebuilt. The Longshoremen's Protective Union purchased the building from the Sons of Temperance in 1912, to be used as their union hall. There was another fire in 1922, when the building was extensively damaged. Subsequently "the building was used for both union meetings and local activities including speeches and bingo". The Resource Foundation for the Arts was founded by The Mummers Troupe who helped purchase, renovate and develop the LSPU Hall as a downtown St. John's performance centre. The RFA started leasing the building in 1975 and bought in 1976, The Mummers Troupe was founded in the autumn of 1972 by Chris Brookes and Lynn Lunde, and is best known for their performances of the "Traditional Newfoundland Christmas Mummers Play" every December from 1972 to 1982. The Hall is now "one of the most important centres for the arts in Newfoundland and Labrador".

The LSPU Hall is a registered heritage building "because of its historical and architectural values". This followed renovations done to "enhancing its heritage features" in 1984. There were further major renovations in 2008. While the interior of the building "has been extensively changed over the years", the exterior is "virtually unchanged since 1922". There are also remains of the original stone foundation walls from the Congregational Church built in 1789. Its plain architectural style is typical of early twentieth century Newfoundland meeting halls.
