= Through the Leaves (play) =

Theatre Play

Through the Leaves is a 1976 play from German playwright, actor and film director Franz Xaver Kroetz. Developed from one of Kroetz' earlier pieces, Men's Business, Through the Leaves premiered in 1981. Critics have described the play as "not pleasant," with Frank Rich of The New York Times going on to write that "it sticks in the mind" in his 1984 review. In 2010, Naomi Skwama of Toronto's NOW Magazine described the play as "absorbing, but nearly unbearable in its intimacy – offering the sick pleasure that comes from reading a stranger’s diary."

The play marked Kroetz' first venture into stark social realism, later followed by the critically successful Tom Fool (1978). Through the Leaves follows a lonely butcher, Martha, and her relationship with factory worker Otto. Through Martha's diary and her interactions with Otto, the audience discovers the pains of an unremarkable relationship in which neither party can relate with the other.

== Canadian Production ==
Toronto's The Company Theatre (TCT) staged the play in 2010, starring Canadian actors Maria Vacratsis and Nicholas Campbell as Martha and Otto. Directed by TCT's co-Artistic Director Philip Riccio, the production played from September 10 – October 3 at Tarragon Theatre to critical acclaim. Through the Leaves was nominated for five Dora Mavor Moore awards in 2011 in the Independent Theatre division: Outstanding Production, Outstanding Direction (Riccio), Outstanding Performance Female (Vacratsis), Outstanding Performance Male (Campbell) and Outstanding Set Design (for set, costume and lighting designer John Thompson). Thompson won the award for set design, his first win in that category, and the show received the award for Outstanding Production.
