= The Diary of Anne Frank (2009 TV series) =

2009 British miniseries

- Genre: Historical drama
- Written by: Anne Frank (diary); Deborah Moggach
- Directed by: Jon Jones
- Starring: Ellie Kendrick; Tamsin Greig; Geoff Breton; Iain Glen; Felicity Jones
- Music by: Charlie Mole
- Country of origin: United Kingdom
- Original language: English
- No. of episodes: 5

Production
- Producer: Elinor Day
- Running time: 150 min.
- Production company: Darlow Smithson Productions

Original release
- Network: BBC One
- Release: 5 January – 9 January 2009

The Diary of Anne Frank is a BBC adaptation, in association with France 2, of The Diary of a Young Girl originally written by Anne Frank from 1942 to 1944 and adapted for television by Deborah Moggach.

It was shown from 5–9 January 2009 in five half-hour episodes. Representatives of the BBC have said that they "hope [that] this drama will bring Anne [Frank] alive to viewers of all generations." A DVD of the series was released on 12 January 2009. It also aired on the Public Broadcasting Service (PBS) Public television in the United States on 11 April 2010, as part of its Masterpiece series. The American broadcast was cut from 150 minutes to 100 and broadcast in one evening instead of over five evenings.

== Episodes ==
=== Amsterdam 6 June 1942 ===
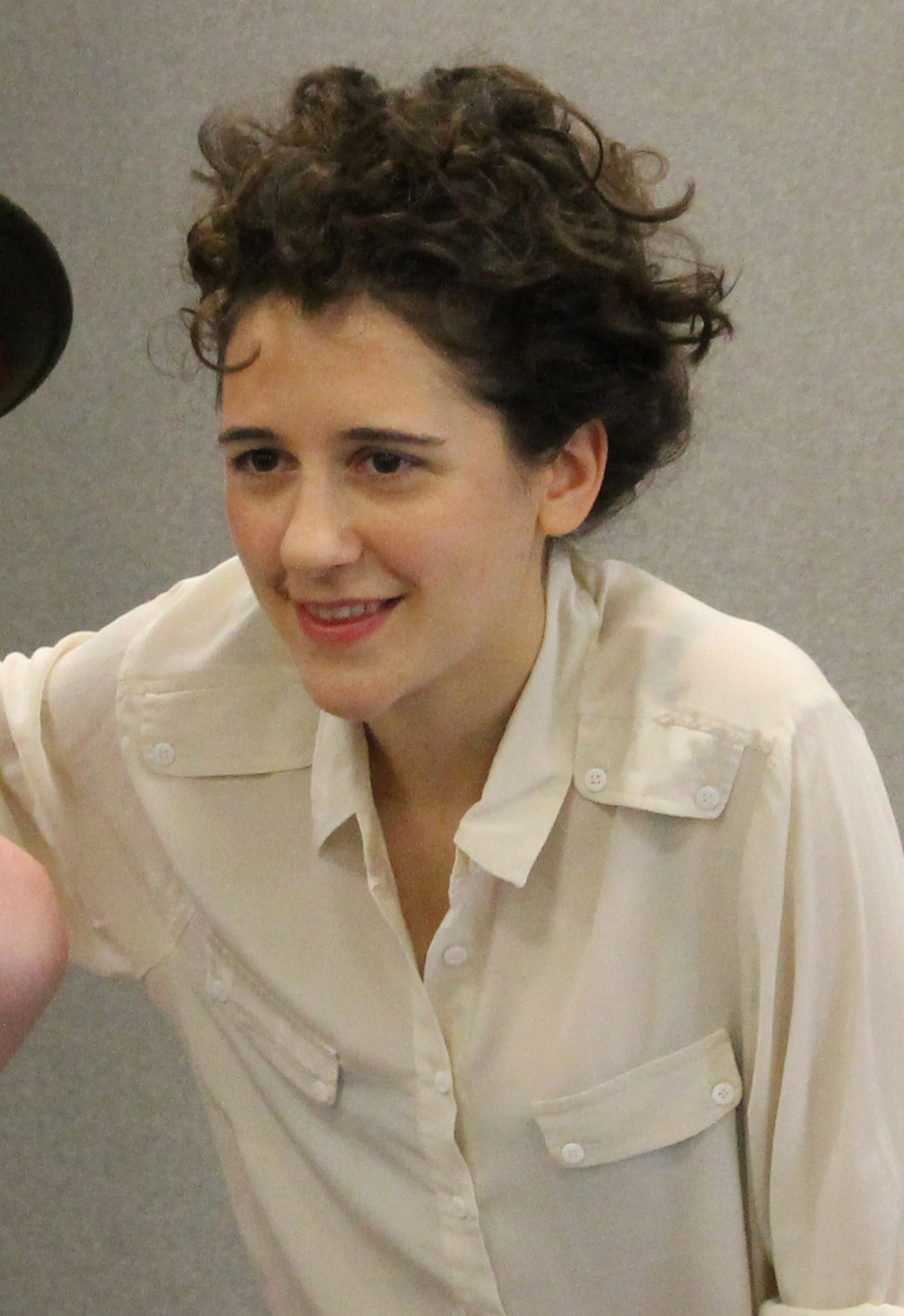
English actress Ellie Kendrick, who portrayed Anne Frank.

The series begins in June 1942, in wartime Nazi-occupied Amsterdam. Annelies Marie Frank, a Jewish girl, is celebrating her 13th birthday; amongst her birthday presents is a red diary. Days later, call-up papers arrive for her 16-year-old sister Margot. Their parents, Otto and Edith, decide to hasten their plan to go into hiding to ensure that the family does not get separated.

The next morning, 6 July 1942, the Franks head to Otto's pectin and spice company. They proceed up to a Secret Annex at the back of the building. Only the trustworthy office staff, such as Miep Gies, know of their existence and have agreed to help them survive. In the annex they must obey strict rules, remaining completely silent during working hours. Otto and Edith sleep in one room, with Margot and Anne next door in another. At the very top of the building is a disused attic for storing food. This soon becomes Anne's getaway, as she is able to gaze outside at a chestnut tree and the tower of the Westerkerk.

At first, Edith and Margot find the confinement hard to bear, while Otto and Anne sew material together to make black-out curtains. They are soon joined by their Jewish friends Mr and Mrs van Daan and their teenage son Peter. Their arrival liven things up, but also brings tension, especially since Peter brought his pet cat. She continues writing her diary.

=== October 1942 ===
It is now October 1942. In the secret annex, the achterhuis, the toilet is blocked and her father, Otto, is forced to try and unblock by hand. Their helpers in the offices downstairs call a plumber, and the family are terrified that he will need to come up to the annex.

Anne finds Mrs. van Daan increasingly hard to bear, as she orders her around and criticises her in a way that her liberal parents never do. But overall they are getting used to their time together, and the strict routine by which they must live. Otto begins to oversee their school studies so that they won't be behind after the war. During an air raid, Anne is so scared that she runs to her father for comfort.

One day Anne invites Miep and her husband Jan to dinner and to stay overnight in her room. When they agree, Anne draws up a special menu in their honour, which Mrs van Daan cooks for them. But Miep brings bad news, which she tells only the Franks, that the van Daans' apartment has been ransacked and all their property confiscated. Also another person arrives to stay at the annex, a dentist called Mr Dussel, who will sleep in Margot's bed.

=== November 1942 ===
It is now November 1942. The routine in the rear annex is now well established - as are the squabbles. Otto is shocked to discover that the building has had to be sold. They fear that the new owner will demand access to the annex and they will be discovered. The lease won't be exchanged for months yet, so for now the threat is over.

When Miep arrives she tells them their helpful grocer has gone missing. Miep also gives Mr Dussel the latest letter and food parcel from his fiancé - this annoys Anne as she thinks he is putting them at greater risk. Her parents agree but do not want to intervene. That evening Anne helps to wash her mother's hair and for once they are close. Soon it is Hanukkah and everyone in the annex gathers for the ceremony around the dinner table.

Food shortages are getting worse and Bep Voskuijl from the office now comes up to the annex for lunch every day. Anne asks Mr Dussel to let her use their shared bedroom for the agreed time but he isn't ready to give up the desk and they row. Otto talks to Dussel and persuades him how important writing is to Anne. Mr Dussel also begins to learn Spanish for his life post-war.

=== June 1943 ===
It is June 1943 and Anne is dreaming about her fourteenth birthday party. Suddenly she wakes up and remembers she is in the annex. Her family give her whatever they can, but the only present that really excites her is a bar of chocolate.

Also, the families are wearing out their clothes and don't have the money to replace them. In fact, the van Daans have little money left and argue about whether they should sell Mrs van Daan's fur coat. Otto measures Anne and Margot against the wall and finds that Anne has grown three inches in the last year. They learn on BBC radio of the capitulation of Italy (September 1943).

Anne is growing into a young woman and is amazed by the changes happening to her body and emotions. Her periods have started and she is becoming aware of her feminine sexuality. She has even started to look differently at Peter. When Peter comes up to the attic she tells him that she sees him differently now and apologises for having teased him in the past. He invites her to accompany him down to the warehouse to collect the potatoes. However, one day on his potato run, Peter forgets to unlock the front doors, forcing the employees to break in. Later, in response to her feelings, Anne writes her parents a hurtful letter.

=== May 1944 ===
It is May 1944 and the Franks are woken up by the sound of intruders downstairs. When the noises seem to stop, Otto and Peter go downstairs to lock the front door so as not to attract the police, but they discover that the burglars are still there and flee back to the annex. The next morning Mr Kugler informs them that the burglars took a lot of valuables and that they must be more careful.

The tension and the summer heat start to get to them and they continually snap at each other. Food shortages are getting worse and the authorities have confiscated all radios. Luckily, Mr Kleiman secretly gives them a replacement. As the bombing raids get worse, Anne, now 15 years old, takes to running up and down the annex stairs to block out the sound. But they try to keep their spirits up and are thrilled when Miep finds some butter to bake a small cake for Edith's birthday.

Finally, their worst nightmare comes true when the Sicherheitsdienst (SD) and Dutch plain-clothed police raid the warehouse (4 August 1944). As all of the Jews are being led away one by one end titles reveal each of their fates. In the final scene, Miep finds Anne's notebooks scattered across the floor and reaches down to pick them up.

== Production ==
The Diary of Anne Frank began filming in October 2007, in the UK.

== Cast ==
- Ellie Kendrick as Anne Frank
- Iain Glen as Otto Frank
- Tamsin Greig as Edith Frank
- Ron Cook as Hermann van Daan
- Lesley Sharp as Petronella van Daan
- Nicholas Farrell as Albert Dussel
- Kate Ashfield as Miep Gies
- Geoff Breton as Peter van Daan
- Felicity Jones as Margot Frank
- Hayley White as Hanneli Goslar (Uncredited)
- Robert Morgan as S.S. Silberbabuer

== Reception ==
Michael Fox of jweekly.com, wrote:

Solidly engrossing and vigorously paced, The Diary of Anne Frank takes place almost entirely (after the first five minutes) in the secret annex above Otto Frank’s warehouse and office. It confines itself to the events recorded by our unintentional heroine — which is to say that younger viewers unfamiliar with the Nazis’ systematic, continent-spanning implementation of the Final Solution aren’t provided with a great deal of detail.(...) This production also has a more contemporary feel thanks to a shockingly candid scene where Anne acknowledges the changes in her body and admits her confusion over puberty. This was one of the passages regarding Anne’s sexuality that Otto Frank removed before the diary’s original publication in 1947, and which were restored in an edition published well after his 1980 death.
