= The Attic: The Hiding of Anne Frank =

1988 television film

- Genre: Drama; History; War
- Based on: Anne Frank Remembered by: Alison Leslie Gold; Miep Gies
- Written by: William Hanley
- Directed by: John Erman
- Starring: Mary Steenburgen; Paul Scofield; Huub Stapel; Eleanor Bron; Frances Cuka; Miriam Karlin; Ronald Pickup; Gary Raymond; Victor Spinetti; Tom Wilkinson; Lisa Jacobs
- Music by: Richard Rodney Bennett
- Countries of origin: United States; United Kingdom
- Original language: English

Production
- Executive producers: Kenneth Kaufman; Michael Lepiner
- Producers: Timothy J. Fee; Nick Gillott; Marjorie Kalins
- Cinematography: Peter Jackson
- Editor: Jerrold L. Ludwig
- Running time: 95 minutes
- Production companies: Telecom Entertainment Inc. Yorkshire Television

Original release
- Network: CBS
- Release: April 17, 1988

The Attic: The Hiding of Anne Frank is a 1988 television film directed by John Erman. It is based on Miep Gies's 1988 book Anne Frank Remembered. The film was broadcast as part of an ad hoc network, Kraft Golden Showcase Network. Playwright William Hanley received an Emmy for his script. The film premiered on CBS on April 17, 1988.

== Plot ==
In 1940, the Nazis invade the Netherlands. Miep Gies is a young woman, and an office assistant of Otto Frank, who is Jewish. As the Nazis begin to murder the Jews, Otto Frank becomes worried about his family. In July 1942, Otto Frank decides to hide his family after his daughter Margot is called to appear for transport to a Nazi labor camp. Miep, who is trusted by Otto, hides them in the attic above the office, that was called The Annexe. The film tells the true story of Gies' struggle to keep the family hidden and safe, as the Nazis turn Amsterdam upside-down.

A few days later, the van Daans join the Franks in hiding, and after some months Albert Dussel, a Jewish dentist, joins them in hiding. Miep, her husband Jan Gies, along with Miep's fellow office workers Mr Kraler, Mr Koophuis, and Elli actively helps the innocent Jews to hide. Miep is never able to keep these hiders out of her thoughts, and she does her best to protect them. But all her efforts are destroyed on August 4, 1944. The Gestapo is informed about the hiders, and they come to the building to arrest them. Mr Kraler and Mr Koophuis are arrested with the hiders, while Miep is spared because she is Austrian (which was pro-Nazi since the Anschluss took over in 1938, the year before the war started as it is German-speaking and the birthplace of Hitler) as well as a Gentile, and Karl Silberbauer, the Gestapo officer who arrested the hiders, was also an Austrian Gentile. So, out of mercy, Silberbauer spares Miep. After the arrest, Miep and Jan go to the annex, and Miep finds Anne Frank's diary in the floor of Anne's room, and she collects it before the Annex is emptied by the Nazis. A day later, Miep decides to bribe Silberbauer in return of her friends, but Silberbauer denies. The war is finished a few months later, and Otto Frank safely returns to Amsterdam. Miep and Jan shelter him. Otto tells Miep that Mrs Frank had been murdered in the Auschwitz concentration camp, and Mr van Daan was gassed by the Nazis in Auschwitz. However, Anne, Margot and Mrs van Daan were sent to the Bergen-Belsen concentration camp, which was not a death camp, and Otto has high hopes for them. But a few days later, a letter comes to Otto informing him that Anne and Margot had both died in the Bergen-Belsen concentration camp. Otto tells Miep, who is distraught. Miep takes Anne's diary, which she has not read, from her drawer and gives it to Otto Frank. While Otto reads Anne's diary, Miep goes to Anne's room in the hiding place, and sits in a chair. She then leaves the building, and the films ends with her cycling home, as we hear her speak in a voice-over.

== Cast ==
- Mary Steenburgen – Miep Gies
- Paul Scofield – Otto Frank
- Lisa Jacobs – Anne Frank
- Huub Stapel – Jan Gies
- Eleanor Bron – Edith Frank
- Frances Cuka – Petronella Van Daan
- Victor Spinetti – Herman Van Daan
- Miriam Karlin – Mrs. Samson
- Ian Sears – Peter van Daan
- Georgia Slowe – Margot Frank
- Isabelle Amyes – Elli Vossen
- Ronald Pickup – Mr. Jo Koophuis
- Gary Raymond – Mr. Victor Kraler
- Jeffrey Robert – Dr. Albert Dussel
- Edda Barends – Lotte Dussel
- Tom Wilkinson – Karl Silberbauer

== Awards ==
Primetime Emmy Award for Outstanding Writing for a Miniseries, Movie or a Dramatic Special (1988)

== See also ==
- The Diary of Anne Frank (1959 film)
- Anne Frank: The Whole Story (2001 mini-series)
- People associated with Anne Frank
- List of Holocaust films
