= The Diary of Anne Frank (play) =

1955 theater play

- Original language: English
- Written by: Frances Goodrich; Albert Hackett
- Characters: Anne Frank; Otto Frank; Miep Gies; Edith Frank; Peter van Daan; Margot Frank; Mr. van Daan; Mrs. van Daan; Mr. Dussel; Mr. Kraler; 1st Man; 2nd Man; 3rd Man
- Genre: Drama
- Setting: Nazi-occupied Amsterdam

Premiere
- Date: October 5, 1955
- Place: Cort Theatre

The Diary of Anne Frank is a stage adaptation of the posthumously published 1947 book The Diary of a Young Girl by Anne Frank. It premiered on Broadway at the Cort Theatre in 1955. Its script also primarily formed the basis of the Academy Award-winning 1959 film adaptation.

== Original Broadway production ==
The play is a dramatization by Frances Goodrich and Albert Hackett, and opened at the Cort Theatre on Broadway on October 5, 1955. The play was produced by Kermit Bloomgarden and directed by Garson Kanin, with scenic design by Boris Aronson and lighting design by Lee Watson. The cast was led by Joseph Schildkraut as Otto Frank, Susan Strasberg as Anne Frank, David Levin as Peter van Daan, Gusti Huber as Edith Frank, Jack Gilford as Mr. Dussel, Dennie Moore as Mrs. van Daan, and Lou Jacobi as Mr. van Daan. The play transferred to fellow Broadway theatre, the Ambassador Theatre in February 1957, and closed there on June 22 after 717 performances. The play then traveled the United States with the original cast, save for Millie Perkins playing Anne Frank.

== Awards ==
The play received the Tony Award for Best Play and was nominated for Best Actress (Susan Strasberg), Best Scenic Design (Boris Aronson), Best Costume Design (Helene Pons), Best Director (Garson Kanin). The play received the Pulitzer Prize for Drama for Albert Hackett and Frances Goodrich. Susan Strasberg won the 1956 Theatre World Award. The play received the 1956 New York Drama Critics Circle award for best play.

== 1997 version ==
The Diary of Anne Frank was presented in June 1997, in a revision of the Goodrich and Hackett adaptation by Wendy Kesselman, directed by James Lapine. Otto Frank was played by George Hearn, Anne by Natalie Portman, Mrs. Van Daan by Linda Lavin, Mr. Van Daan by Harris Yulin, Peter Van Daan by Jonathan Charles Kaplan, and Edith Frank by Sophie Hayden. The play previewed in Boston in the Colonial Theatre before opening at Manhattan's Music Box Theatre in December 1997.

The production received two nominations for 1998 Tony Award for Best Revival of a Play and for Best Featured Actress (Linda Lavin). It received two Drama Desk nominations: for Outstanding Featured Actor (Harris Yulin) and Outstanding Featured Actress (Linda Lavin).
