= Johannes Hendrik Voskuijl =

Hider of Anne Frank (1892–1945)

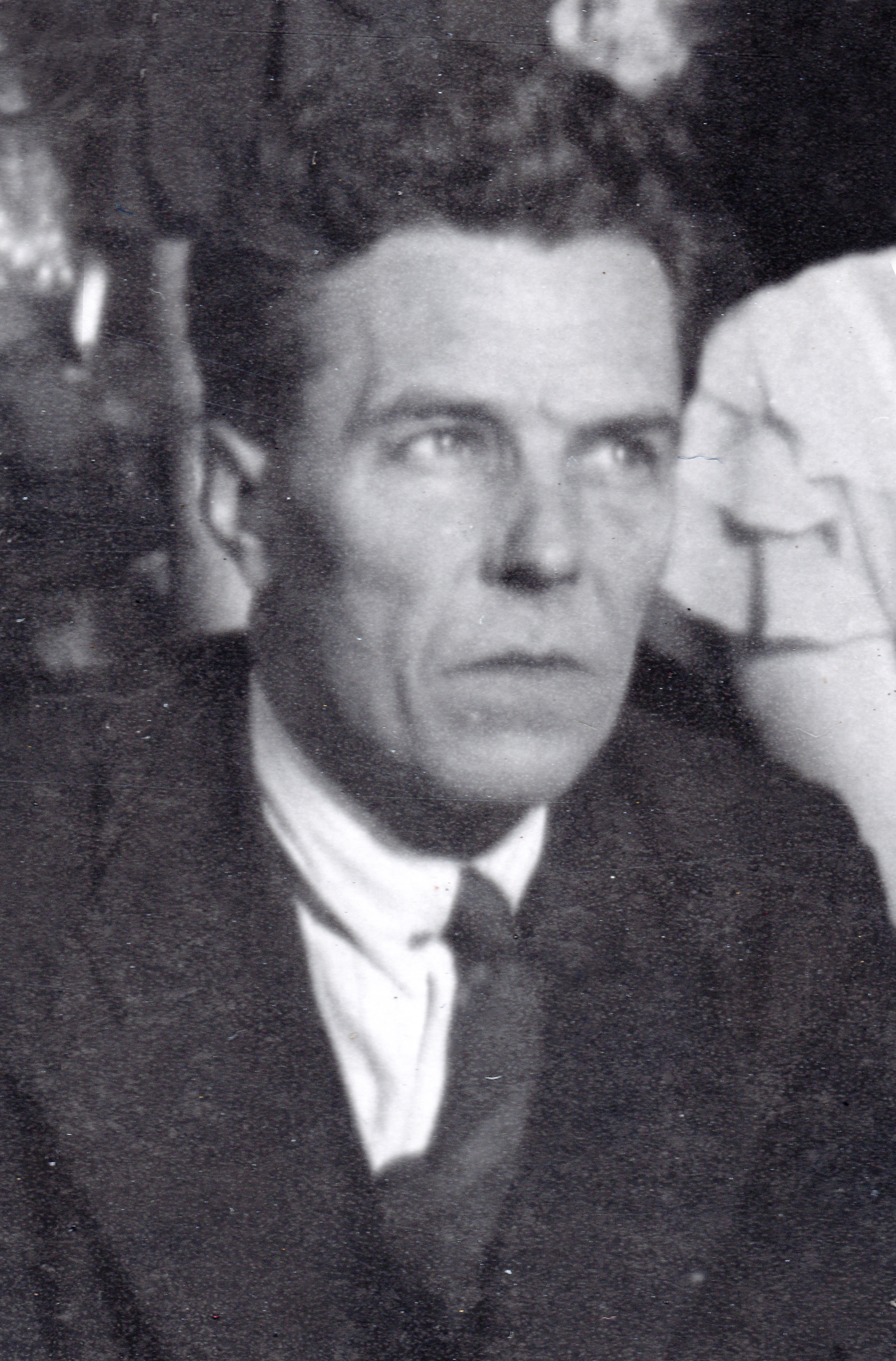
- December 1940
- Born: January 15, 1892; Amsterdam, Netherlands
- Died: November 27, 1945 (aged 53); Amsterdam, Netherlands
- Occupation: Warehouse manager
- Employer: Otto Frank
- Known for: helping to hide Anne Frank and her family
- Children: 8, including Bep Voskuijl

Johannes Hendrik Voskuijl (15 January 1892 – 27 November 1945) was one of the people who helped to hide Anne Frank and the other people of the Secret Annex in Amsterdam. In the earliest editions of Het Achterhuis, known in English as The Diary of Anne Frank, Voskuijl is referred to as "Mr. Vossen", as he was the father of helper Bep Voskuijl, who is named "Elli Vossen" in the diary. Voskuijl built the famous bookcase that covered the hiding place.

== Helper in the Secret Annex ==
Voskuijl and his wife Christina Sodenkamp had eight children, one of whom was Bep Voskuijl (1919–1983). He worked as the manager of the warehouses of the Opekta company at 263 Prinsengracht, administered by Otto Frank. In July 1942, Frank went into hiding in the same building, together with his wife Edith Holländer and his daughters Margot and Anne, later accompanied by the van Pels family and dentist Fritz Pfeffer. After his daughter Bep, who worked at the Opekta office, Voskuijl was let in on the secret, too. The other warehouse employees were not aware of the presence of people in hiding. Voskuijl and his daughter supported each other tremendously in these years. They could only discuss the Annex with each other, as they kept silent to the rest of the Voskuijl family for safety reasons.

In her diary, Anne Frank wrote that Voskuijl "couldn't do enough to help". For the hiders, it was a great reassurance knowing he would keep an eye on the situation in the warehouse. Johannes would also make sure that the waste from the hiding place disappeared unnoticed in the morning. Furthermore, in August 1942, Voskuijl built the famous bookcase that concealed the entrance to the Secret Annex. He also made Saint Nicholas gifts for the people in hiding, such as an ashtray for Hermann van Pels, a picture frame for Pfeffer, and bookends for Otto Frank.

== Illness ==
The people in hiding felt a great loss when Voskuijl had to stop working in the summer of 1943, as he suffered from stomach cancer. On 15 June 1943, Anne Frank wrote: "It is a disaster for us that good old Voskuijl won't be able to keep us in touch with all that goes on, and all he hears in the warehouse. He was our best helper and security adviser; we miss him very much indeed."

Johannes Voskuijl died, at the end of the war, in Amsterdam on 27 November 1945. Otto Frank and the rest of the helpers attended his funeral on 1 December.
