= Voskuijl =

Voskuijl is a surname. Notable people with the surname include:

- Bep Voskuijl (1919–1983), Dutch resident of Amsterdam who helped hide Anne Frank and others from the Nazis
- Johannes Hendrik Voskuijl (1892–1945), Dutch resident of Amsterdam who helped hide Anne Frank and others from the Nazis
