= List of people associated with Anne Frank =

Anne Frank (12 June 1929 – c. February – March 1945) was a German-born Jewish girl who, along with her family and four other people, hid in the second and third floor rooms at the back of her father's Amsterdam company during the Nazi occupation of the Netherlands in World War II. Helped by several trusted employees of the company, the group of eight survived in the achterhuis (literally "back-house", usually translated as "secret annex") for more than two years before they were arrested, it is not known whether by chance or after a betrayal. Anne kept a diary from 12 June 1942 until 1 August 1944, three days before the residents of the annex were arrested. Anne mentioned several times in her writings that her sister Margot Frank also kept a diary, but no trace of Margot's diary was ever found.

After spending time in both Westerbork and Auschwitz, Anne and her elder sister Margot were eventually transported to Bergen-Belsen, which was swept by a massive typhus epidemic that began in the camp in January 1945. Evidently, they died a few days apart sometime in February or March 1945. Both were buried in one of the mass graves at Belsen, though it is unknown to this day exactly which of the many mass graves at Belsen contains their remains. Their "tombstone" that can be viewed at Belsen today is a cenotaph for the two sisters. Their father, Otto Frank, survived the war and upon his return to Amsterdam was given the diary his daughter had kept during their period of confinement, which had been rescued from the ransacked achterhuis by Miep Gies (below) who, out of respect for Anne's privacy, had not read it. The diary was first published in 1947, and by virtue of worldwide sales since then, it has become one of the most widely read books in history. It is recognized both for its historical value as a document of the Holocaust and for the high quality of writing displayed by such a young author. In 2010, Anne was honored as one of the most iconic women of the year. She is also one of the most well known victims of the Holocaust. Her friend Eva Schloss, who survived the Holocaust, became her stepsister after Anne Frank's death.

== The other occupants of the Secret Annex ==
- The Frank family moved into the Secret Annex all together. They were the first occupants, and for the first few days, the only occupants, of the hiding place, having moved in on 6 July 1942.
  - Otto Frank (12 May 1889 – 19 August 1980; Anne and Margot's father, (husband of Edith) was in poor health, due to primarily malnutrition, when he was left behind in Auschwitz with the rest of those in the sick barracks, when the Nazis evacuated all other prisoners on a death march. He survived until the Russians liberated Auschwitz shortly afterward. In 1953, he married Elfride "Fritzi" Markovits-Geiringer, an Auschwitz survivor who lost her first husband and her son when they, too, were sent on a death march out of Auschwitz, and whose daughter Eva, also a survivor, was a neighborhood friend of the Frank sisters. Otto devoted his life to spreading the message of his daughter and her diary, as well as to defending it against Neo-Nazi claims that it was a forgery or fake. Otto died in Birsfelden, Switzerland from lung cancer, on 19 August 1980 at age 91. His widow, Fritzi, continued his work until her own death in October 1998.
  - Edith Frank (16 January 1900 – 6 January 1945; Anne and Margot's mother, wife of Otto) was left behind in Auschwitz-Birkenau when her daughters and Auguste van Pels were transferred to Bergen-Belsen, as her health had started to deteriorate. Witnesses reported that her despair at being separated from her daughters led to an emotional breakdown. They described her searching for her daughters endlessly and said that she seemed to not understand that they had gone, although she had seen them board the train that took them out of the camp. They also said that she began to hoard what little food she could obtain, hiding it under her bunk to give to Anne and Margot when she saw them. They said that Edith Frank told them Anne and Margot needed the food more than she did, and she therefore refused to eat it. Edith died on 6 January 1945 from starvation and exhaustion, aged 44, 21 days before the camp was liberated.
  - Margot Frank (16 February 1926 – February 1945) died of typhus in Bergen-Belsen. According to recollections from several eyewitnesses, this occurred "a few days" before Anne's death, most likely in early-mid February 1945, though like Anne's death, the exact date is not known.
- The Van Pels family joined the Franks in their hiding place in concealed rooms at the rear of Otto Frank's office building, on 13 July 1942. Anne gave the van Pels family a pseudonym in her diary (as she did for most other characters in her diary); she called them "Van Daan" in her diary. Although their helpers are today known almost exclusively by their own names, the Franks' fellow occupants in the achterhuis retain their pseudonyms in several editions and adaptations of Anne's diary, including the Definitive Edition.
  - Hermann van Pels (31 March 1898 – October 1944; known as Hans in the first manuscript of the diary) was murdered in Auschwitz, being the first of the eight to die. He was the only member of the group to be gassed. However, according to eyewitness testimony, this did not happen on the day van Pels arrived there. Sal de Liema, an inmate at Auschwitz who knew both Otto Frank and Hermann van Pels, said that after two or three days in the camp, van Pels mentally "gave up", which was generally the beginning of the end for any concentration camp inmate. He later injured his thumb on a work detail and requested to be sent to the sick barracks. Soon after that, during a sweep of the sick barracks for selection, van Pels was sent to the gas chambers. This occurred about three weeks after his arrival at Auschwitz, most likely in very early October 1944, and van Pels' selection was witnessed by both his son Peter and by Otto Frank.
  - Auguste van Pels (29 September 1900– April 1945; known as Petronella in the diary), born Auguste Röttgen (Hermann's wife), whose date and place of death are unknown. Witnesses testified that she was with the Frank sisters during part of their time in Bergen-Belsen, but that van Pels was not present when they died in February or March. According to German records (her registration card), van Pels was sent to Bergen-Belsen concentration camp in Germany with a group of eight women on 26 November 1944. Hannah Goslar's testimony was that she spoke to van Pels through the barbed wire fence "in late January or early February". Auguste was transferred on 6 February 1945, to Raguhn (Buchenwald in Germany), then to the Czechoslovakia camp Theresienstadt on 9 April. This same card lists her as being alive on 11 April 1945. As such, van Pels must have died en route to Theresienstadt or shortly after her arrival there, the date of her death occurring most likely either the first half or mid-April 1945, but before 8 May 1945, when the camp was liberated. However, Rachel van Amerongen-Frankfoorder, eyewitness of van Pels' death, states that the Nazis murdered van Pels by throwing her onto the train tracks during the transport to Theresienstadt in April 1945.
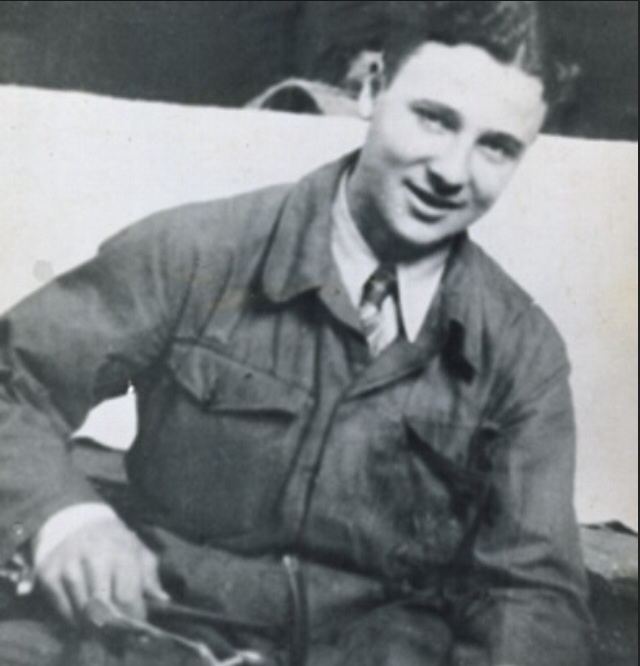
  - Peter van Pels wearing a (barely visible) Star of David; photo May–July 1942
    Peter van Pels (8 November 1926 – 10 May 1945; Hermann and Auguste's son, known as Peter in the diary and Alfred in the first manuscript) died in Mauthausen. Otto Frank had protected him during their period of imprisonment together, as they were assigned to the same work group. Frank later stated that he had urged Peter to hide in Auschwitz and stay behind with him, rather than set out on a forced march. However, Peter believed that he would have a better chance of survival if he joined the death march out of Auschwitz. Mauthausen Concentration Camp records indicate that Peter van Pels was registered upon arriving there on 25 January 1945. Four days later, he was placed in an outdoor labor group, Quarz. On 11 April, Peter was sent to the sick barracks. His exact death date is unknown, but the International Red Cross stated that it was 10 May 1945, five days after Mauthausen was liberated by men from the 11th Armored Division of the U.S. Third Army. Peter was 18 years old and the last member of the group to die while imprisoned.
- Fritz Pfeffer (30 April 1889 – 20 December 1944; family dentist of Miep Gies and the van Pels, and known as Albert Dussel in the diary) died on 20 December 1944 in Neuengamme concentration camp. His cause of death was listed in the camp records as "enterocolitis", a catch-all term that covered, among other things, dysentery and cholera, both of which were common causes of death in the camps. Of all the stressful relationships precipitated by living in such close proximity with each other for two years, the relationship between Anne and Fritz Pfeffer was one of the most difficult for both, as her diary shows.

== The Helpers ==
- Miep Gies (15 February 1909 – 11 January 2010) saved parts of Anne Frank's book (just like the younger secretary Bep Voskuijl). She later said that if she had read it, she would have needed to destroy it, as it contained a great deal of incriminating information, such as the names of all of the annex helpers, as well as many of their Dutch Underground contacts. She and her husband, Jan, took Otto Frank into their home, where he lived from 1945 (after his liberation from Auschwitz concentration camp) until 1952. In 1994, she received the "Order of Merit" of the Federal Republic of Germany, and in 1995, received the highest honor from the Yad Vashem, the Righteous Among the Nations. She was appointed a "Knight of the Order of Orange-Nassau" by Queen Beatrix of the Netherlands. In 1996, Gies shared an Academy Award with Jon Blair for their documentary Anne Frank Remembered (1995), based largely on Gies's 1987 book of the same title. She also wrote the afterword for Melissa Müller's biography of Anne Frank. Gies stated that every year she spent 4 August in mourning, the date those in the Annex were arrested. Gies died on 11 January 2010, following a short illness, at the age of 100.
- Jan Gies (18 August 1905 – 26 January 1993) (Miep's husband, known as Henk in The Diary of a Young Girl) was a social worker and, for part of the war, a member of the Dutch Resistance; thus, he was able to procure things for the people in the annex that would have been almost impossible to obtain any other way. He left the Underground in 1944, when an incident caused him to believe his safety had been compromised. Jan died of complications from diabetes on 26 January 1993 in Amsterdam. He and Miep had been married for 52 years.
- Johannes Kleiman (17 August 1896 – 28 January 1959) (known as Mr. Koophuis in The Diary of a Young Girl) spent about six weeks in a work camp after his arrest and was released after intervention from the Red Cross, because of his fragile health. He returned to Opekta and took over the firm when Otto Frank moved to Basel in 1952. He died at his office desk of a stroke in 1959, aged 62.
- Victor Kugler (5 June 1900 – 14 December 1981) (known as Mr. Kraler in The Diary of a Young Girl) spent seven months in various work camps and escaped into a farm field in March 1945, during the confusion that resulted when the prisoner march he was on that day was strafed by British Spitfires. Working his way back to his hometown of Hilversum on foot and by bicycle, he remained in hiding there until liberated by Canadian troops a few weeks later. After his wife died, he emigrated to Canada in 1955 (where several of his relatives already lived) and resided in Toronto. On September 16, 1958, he appeared on To Tell the Truth, as "the hider" of Otto and Anne Frank. He received the "Medal of the Righteous" from the Yad Vashem Memorial, with a tree planted in his honour on the Boulevard of the Righteous Among the Nations in 1973. He died on 16 December 1981 in Toronto, after a long illness, at the age of 81.
- Bep Voskuijl (5 July 1919 – 06 May 1983)(known as Elli Vossen in The Diary of a Young Girl), like her colleagues, was instructed to stay in the office on the day the Franks were forced from their hiding place, but in the confusion that followed, Bep managed to escape with a few documents that would have incriminated the Secret Annex protectors' black market contacts. Bep and Miep found Anne's diaries and papers after the eight prisoners, together with Kugler and Kleiman, had been arrested and removed from the building. Bep left Opekta shortly after the war and married Cornelis van Wijk in 1946. While she did grant an interview to a Dutch magazine some years after the war, she mostly shunned publicity. However, Bep kept her own scrapbook of Anne-related articles throughout her life. Bep and her husband had four children, the last a daughter whom she named "Anne-Marie", in honor of Anne. Bep died in Amsterdam on 6 May 1983.
- Johannes Hendrik Voskuijl 15 January 1892 – 27 November 1945) (Bep's father, known as Mr. Vossen in The Diary of a Young Girl) was lauded constantly by the eight in hiding as a tremendous help with all matters during their early days in the achterhuis. For example, he designed and built the "swinging bookcase" that concealed the entrance to the annex. However, Anne often mentioned his health problems in her diary, and he became incapacitated after a diagnosis of abdominal cancer. He ultimately died of the disease in late November 1945.

== Friends and extended family ==
- Nanette "Nanny" Blitz Konig (born 6 April 1929) was another schoolmate of Anne's. Nanette, by her own admission, was the girl given the made-up initials "E. S." in the early pages of Anne's diary. While they were not always on the best of terms during school days (their personalities were much too similar), Nanny had been invited to Anne's 13th birthday party, and when they met in Bergen-Belsen, their reunion was enthusiastic. With prisoners constantly being shifted around in the huge camp, Nanny quickly lost track of Anne. Nanette was the only member of her family to survive the war. While she was recovering from tuberculosis in a hospital immediately after the war, Otto Frank got in touch with her, and she was able to write and give him some information about her encounter with Anne at Belsen. Nanette and her family, as of 2019, resided in São Paulo, Brazil. (Müller, p. 269).
- Mary Bos (26 September, 1928 – 14 April, 2020) was a schoolmate from Anne's Montessori school and an invited guest at Anne's 10th birthday party; in the well-known photo of that gathering, she is the very slender girl third from the right. Mary was a gifted artist, whose drawings and paintings were much admired by her peers. She is mentioned in passing in Anne's diary, when Anne writes of dreaming that she and Peter Schiff are looking "at a book of drawings by Mary Bos". Mary and her parents had emigrated to the United States in February 1940. When they left, Anne wrote Mary a little poem as a goodbye note. Mary almost forgot about Anne, but after the war, when Anne's diary was published, she recalled her friend Anne from Montessori school. After the war, Mary wed Bob Schneider. After Anne's diary was first published in 1947, Mary finally learned of Anne's fate. Mary Bos died on April 14, 2020.
- Käthe "Kitty" Egyedi (1928 – 2010) was another lifelong friend of Anne's and was, like Mary Bos, a fine artist. (Kitty remained a lifelong friend of Mary Bos; they communicated regularly by letter, even after Mary moved permanently to the United States in 1940). Schoolmates at Montessori, Anne and Kitty attended different schools after sixth grade, and hence they had drifted apart somewhat. But shortly before the Franks went into hiding, Kitty visited Anne one day when Anne was in bed with a slight fever. They chatted the whole afternoon, and Kitty was impressed and pleased that the shrill, blunt, and boy-crazy friend she remembered from Montessori school had begun to mature into a somewhat more introspective and thoughtful girl. This drew them closer together again. In the picture of Anne's 10th birthday referenced above under "Mary Bos", Kitty is the girl in the center with the dark pleated skirt. Kitty never felt that Anne was specifically thinking of her when addressing her diary passages to "Kitty", and most Anne scholars and biographers agree, believing that Anne borrowed the name from Cissy van Marxveldt's Joop ter Heul books (these were a great favorite of Anne's, and Joop's best friend was a character named "Kitty Francken"). Kitty's entire family survived internment at Theresienstadt, and, following her father's profession, Kitty became a dentist after the war. (Müller p. 290).
- Bernhard (Bernd) "Buddy" Elias (2 June 1925 – 16 March 2015) was a cousin of Anne's who lived in Switzerland and a great favorite of hers. Four years older than Anne (and hence, even older than Margot), his rollicking sense of fun matched Anne's temperament perfectly, and he much preferred Anne as a playmate to the staid and proper Margot. Everyone called him "Buddy" except Anne, who always called him "Bernd". He was a very talented ice skater, which Anne hugely admired. She even wrote an imaginary movie plot in her diary, wherein she would skate with Bernd, and included a sketch of the costume she would wear. After a long career as a professional skater and actor, he eventually became the head of the Anne Frank Fund in Basel (a separate organization from the Anne Frank Foundation in Amsterdam).(Müller, p. 270). Died 16 March 2015.
- Several members of the Frank and Holländer families fled Germany, including Otto's mother and sister, who fled to Switzerland, and Edith's two brothers, Julius and Walter, who fled to the United States. All of them survived the war. In his later years, Otto Frank lamented his decision to take his own family to the Netherlands.
- Eva Geiringer (11 May 1929 – 3 January 2026) (Eva Schloss) shared a similar history with Anne. The Geiringers lived on the opposite side of Merwedeplein, the square where the Franks' apartment was located, and Eva and Anne were almost exactly the same age. Eva was also a close friend of Sanne Ledermann's, and she knew both Anne and Margot. Eva described herself as an out-and-out tomboy, and hence she was in awe of Anne's fashion sense and worldliness, but she was somewhat puzzled by Anne's fascination with boys. "I had a brother, so boys were no big thing to me", Eva wrote. But Anne had introduced Eva to Otto Frank when the Geiringers first came to Amsterdam "so you can speak German with someone", as Anne had said, and Eva never forgot Otto's warmth and kindness to her. Though they were acquainted on a first-name basis, Eva and Anne were not especially close, as they had different groups of friends aside from their mutual close friendship with Sanne Ledermann. Eva's brother Heinz was called up for deportation to labor camp on the same day as Margot Frank, and the Geiringers went into hiding at the same time the Franks did, though the Geiringer family split into two groups to do so – Eva and her mother in one location, and Heinz and his father at another. Though hiding in two separate locations, all four of the Geiringers were betrayed on the same day, about three months before the Frank family was arrested. Eva survived Auschwitz, and when the Russians liberated Birkenau, the women's sector of the camp, she walked the mile-and-a-half distance to the men's camp to look for her father and brother, finding out much later that they had not survived the prisoner march out of Auschwitz. But when she entered the sick barracks of the men's camp, she recognized Otto Frank and had a warm reunion with him. Eight years later, Otto married Eva's widowed mother Elfriede (Fritzi) Geiringer, thereby making Eva a stepsister of Anne and Margot's. Eva later wrote her autobiography Eva's Story: A Survivor's Tale by the Stepsister of Anne Frank (1988), which served as the inspiration for the development of a popular multimedia stage presentation about the Holocaust called And Then They Came for Me. Eva also co-authored, with Barbara Powers, an autobiography targeted to younger readers and considered a suitable companion book to Anne's diary, titled Promise, in which she describes her family's happy life before going into hiding, and the experiences of living in hiding during the Nazi occupation, of going to the concentration camps, and finally, of going after liberation to the house where Heinz and their father had hidden, to retrieve the paintings Heinz had hidden beneath the floorboards there. Heinz's paintings have been displayed in exhibitions in the United States and are now a part of a permanent exhibition in Amsterdam's war museum. In 2013, Eva Schloss' memoir of life after the Holocaust, After Auschwitz: A Story of Heartbreak and Survival by the stepsister of Anne Frank, was published. After the war, Eva eventually built a new life in London with her husband of 60 years, Zvi Schloss, with whom she has three daughters. In May 2013, she was featured on BBC Radio 4's Woman's Hour.
- Eugene Hollander (14 December 1912 – 15 December 1996) first-cousin of Frank's mother. Holocaust survivor, wrote the memoir From the Hell of the Holocaust: A Survivor's Story. Died 15 December 1996.
- Charlotte Kaletta (16 June 1908 – 13 June 1986) the common law wife of Fritz Pfeffer, was not Jewish and therefore was able to remain in her Amsterdam apartment during the occupation. Kaletta and Pfeffer had been regulars at the Sunday afternoon "coffees" hosted by the Franks before the war, and hence she knew the entire Frank family. Miep Gies was especially touched by the devotion Pfeffer and Kaletta displayed to each other, and frequently passed letters from one to the other, an act which the other members of the household viewed as imprudent, but which Gies felt was important. Kaletta's Jewish husband died in Neuengamme, but she held hope for some time after the war's end that Pfeffer had survived. When she learned of his death, she married him posthumously; Otto Frank made the arrangements for her. Frank was always sympathetic to her and continued to offer her assistance, but in the mid-1950s she severed all contact with him, and with Miep and Jan Gies, because she was offended by the unflattering depiction of Pfeffer in Anne's diary and later by the way his character was written in the stage play The Diary of Anne Frank by Goodrich and Hackett. Charlotte died in Amsterdam on 13 June 1986.
- Juultje Ketellaper (26 June, 1928 – 9 July 1943) and Martha van den Berg (29 January, 1929 – 09 July, 2013) are two other childhood friends of Anne's who appear in the picture of Anne's 10th birthday party. Very little is known about either girl. Juultje, the very tall girl near the center, was gassed by the Nazis in Sobibór. She may have been a Montessori schoolmate of Anne's or merely a neighborhood friend. Martha, on the far right in the photograph, survived the war. Martha was Anne's Montessori schoolmate and is seen in another picture with Anne taken during Anne's last term at Montessori.
- Hannelore "Hansi" Klein (born 3 August 1927) (Laureen Nussbaum) was exactly midway in age between Anne and Margot. Hansi was an exception among those who knew Anne – she was rather indifferent about Anne and idolized Anne's sister Margot instead. But Anne, Hansi, and Hansi's two sisters performed in a holiday play about a vain princess who is punished with a long nose for her vanity, until she sees the error of her ways. Anne played the princess; Hansi noted that she played the role to perfection and had "natural charisma". Most people felt that Margot was the more beautiful of the Frank sisters, but Hansi observed that Anne, in her opinion, was prettier than Margot because "she [Anne] was always smiling". Aside from those anecdotes, however, Hansi thought of Anne primarily as a noisy chatterbox, and "a shrimp", and she was surprised and impressed with Anne's inner depth upon reading the diary much later. Hansi married a young physician after the war and, upon emigrating to America, changed her first name to "Laureen". She ultimately became a professor of foreign literature and languages at Portland State University.
- Barbara Ledermann (born 4 September 1925) Sanne's sister who was a friend of Margot's, had, through contacts in the Dutch Underground, acquired a German ID card (becoming "Barbara Waarts") and worked as a courier for the Underground. She survived the war and later married the Nobel Prize–winning biochemist Martin Rodbell.
- Susanne "Sanne" Ledermann (7 October 1928 – 19 November 1943) was Anne's constant companion from the time of her arrival in Amsterdam and is mentioned several times at the beginning of the diary. She was considered the "quiet" one of the trio of "Anne, Hanne and Sanne". She was very intelligent, and according to Anne, very facile with poetry. Sanne's full first name is variously listed in different sources as both "Susanne" and "Susanna". Only her friends called her "Sanne"; her family used the more Germanic "Susi". After his return to Amsterdam, Otto Frank learned that Sanne and her parents, Franz and Ilse, were arrested on 20 June 1943. Sanne and her parents were sent first to Westerbork, then on 16 November to Auschwitz, where all three were gassed upon arrival.
- Gertrud Naumann (28 March, 1917 – 1 December, 2002) was a friend, companion, and occasional babysitter of Anne and Margot's in Germany. Although several years older than Margot, she always played with both of the Frank sisters, and she was a neighborhood favorite of both Mr. and Mrs. Frank's. After the Franks moved to Amsterdam, Gertrud kept contact with them through letters. Being Christian, Gertrud and her family were able to avoid persecution in the war. Gertrud was one of the first friends in Germany with whom Otto Frank got in touch after the war. In 1949, Gertrud married Karl Trenz. She died in 2002 at the age of 85.
- Hannah Elisabeth "Hanneli" Pick-Goslar (12 November 1928 – 28 October 2022) known to most of her friends as "Lies", was Anne's oldest friend, along with Sanne Ledermann. While Hannah was in Bergen-Belsen, she met Auguste van Pels by asking through a hay-filled barbed wire fence if anyone who could hear her voice spoke Dutch. Mrs. van Pels answered her and remembered Hannah from peacetime in Amsterdam. Mrs. van Pels then told Hannah that Anne was a prisoner in the section of the camp van Pels herself was in. Hannah was astonished, as she, like most people back in Amsterdam, believed the Franks had escaped to Switzerland. Hannah was able to talk to Anne several times through the barrier and to toss some essentials over it for her. Anne had told Hannah at this point that she believed both of her parents were dead, and in later years Hannah reflected that if Anne had known her father were still alive, she might have found the strength to survive until the camp was liberated. Shortly after Hannah threw the bundle over the fence for Anne, Anne's contingent of prisoners was moved, and Hannah never heard from her again. Hannah and her little sister Gabi were the only members of their family to survive the war, and Hannah was near death from typhus and tuberculosis when the Russians liberated the train in which she and Gabi were being transported, reportedly to Theresienstadt. After recovering, Hannah emigrated to Israel, became a nurse, and ultimately a grandmother of ten. She died on October 28, 2022, at the age of 93.
- Lutz Peter Schiff (9 September 1926 – 31 May 1945) For all the admiring boys Anne was surrounded with during her school days, she said repeatedly in her diary that the only one she deeply cared about was Peter Schiff, whom she called "Petel". He was three years older than Anne and they had, according to Anne, been "inseparable" during the summer of 1940, when Anne turned 11. Then, Peter changed addresses, and a new acquaintance slightly older than Peter convinced him Anne was "just a child". Anne had several vivid dreams of Peter while in hiding, wrote about them in her diary, and realized herself that she saw Peter van Pels, at least partially, as a surrogate for Peter Schiff. Anne implies in her diary (12 January 1944) that Peter Schiff gave her a pendant as a gift, which she cherished from then on. Schiff was also a prisoner at Bergen-Belsen, though he was transported from there to Auschwitz before Anne and Margot arrived at Belsen. It is known for certain that he died in Auschwitz, although the exact date of his death is unclear. In 2009, the Anne Frank House received a photograph of Schiff as a boy, donated by one of his former classmates; it can be seen, along with the story of its donation, on the Anne Frank House website.
- Helmuth "Hello" Silberberg (8 June 1926 – 26 June 2015) was the boy Anne was closest to at the time her family went into hiding, though they had only known each other about two weeks at that time. Born in Gelsenkirchen, Germany, his parents sent him to Amsterdam to live with his grandparents, believing, like Otto Frank, that Hitler would respect The Netherlands' neutrality. Silberberg's grandfather, who disliked the name Helmuth, dubbed him "Hello". Hello was 16 and adored Anne, but she wrote in her diary that she was "not in love with Hello, he is just a friend, or as mummy would say, one of my 'beaux'", though Anne also remarked in her diary on how much she enjoyed Hello's company, and she speculated that he might become "a real friend" over time. By a very convoluted series of events, including several narrow escapes from the Nazis, Hello eventually reunited with his parents in Belgium. Belgium was also an occupied country, however, and he and his family were still "in hiding", though not under circumstances as difficult as the Franks'. The American forces liberated the town where the Silberbergs were hiding on 3 September 1944, and Hello was freed. This was on the same day that Anne and her family left on the last transport from Westerbork to Auschwitz. Hello emigrated to the United States after the war and was later known as Ed Silverberg. He appeared as Ed Silverberg in the multimedia stage presentation about the Holocaust called, And Then They Came for Me. He died in 2015 at age 89.
- Rie "Ietje" Swillens (12 July 1929 – September 1, 2001) was another good friend of Anne's all the way through Montessori school. Ietje was the girl with whom Anne breathlessly shared the news concerning one of Anne's maternal uncles, who had been arrested by the Nazis and sent to labor camp (he later was released and emigrated to the United States). Being Christian, Ietje's family was able to live out the war in Amsterdam. Ietje became a teacher in later years and today lives in Amstelveen, outside of Amsterdam. She is the girl second from right in the "10 birthday" picture.
- Lucia "Lucie" van Dijk (March 28, 1929 – January 14, 2000) was a Christian friend from the Montessori school. Lucie's mother was an adamant member of the NSB until the end of the war, but Lucie's disillusioned father left the party in 1942. Anne was shocked when the van Dijks became party members, but Otto Frank patiently explained to her that they could still be good people even if they had distasteful politics. Lucie herself was briefly a rather conflicted and nervous member of the Jeugdstorm (Nazi youth group), but between her father's later abandonment of the party and her grandmother's absolute abhorrence of anything connected with National Socialism, Lucie dropped out of the Jeugdstorm in late 1942. She married after the war and has lived her whole life in Amsterdam. In the group picture of Anne's 10th birthday party, Lucie is the girl on the extreme left.
- Jacqueline Yvonne Meta "Jacque" van Maarsen (30 January 1929 – 13 February 2025) or "Jacque", as she was known to everyone, was Anne's best friend at the time the Frank family went into hiding. Jacque sincerely liked Anne, but at times found her too demanding in her friendship. Anne, writing later in her diary, was remorseful for her own attitude toward Jacque, regarding with better understanding Jacque's desire to have other close girlfriends as well – "I just want to apologize and explain things", Anne wrote. After two and a half months in hiding, Anne composed a farewell letter to Jacque in her diary, vowing her lifelong friendship. Jacque read this passage much later, after the publication of the diary. Jacque's French-born mother was a Christian, and that, along with several other extenuating circumstances, combined to get the "J" (for "Jew") removed from the family's identification cards. The van Maarsens were thus able to live out the war years in Amsterdam. Jacque later married her childhood sweetheart Ruud Sanders and lived in Amsterdam, where she was a bookbinder and wrote four books on their notable friendship: Anne and Jopie (1990), My Friend, Anne Frank (1996), My Name Is Anne, She Said, Anne Frank (2003), and Inheriting Anne Frank (2009). Van Maarsen died on 13 February 2025, aged 96.
- Max van Reveled was a boarder with the Van Daans at Guider Amsterdam 34 (before the Van Daans moved into the Annex), and frequently had dinner with the Van Daans and Franks. Max survived the war. After the war, Otto Frank gave Max a first edition of Anne's book, published in 1947 as "Het Achterhuis."
- Ilse Wagner (26 January 1929 – 2 April 1943) whom Jacque van Maarsen described as "a sweet and sensible girl", is mentioned several times in the early part of the diary. Ilse's family had a table tennis set, and Anne and Margot frequently went to her house to play. Wagner was the first of Anne's circle of friends to be deported. Along with her mother and grandmother, she was sent to Westerbork in January 1943, then to Sobibór extermination camp, where all three were gassed upon arrival on 2 April 1943. (Müller, p. 301).

== Arresting officer ==
- Karl Silberbauer (21 June 1911 – 2 September 1972) was the Sicherheitsdienst (Nazi Security Service) officer who arrested Anne Frank and her family in their hiding place in 1944. He was tracked down and identified as the arresting officer in October 1963 by the Nazi hunter Simon Wiesenthal. Although his memories of the arrest were notably vivid, Silberbauer had not been told by his superior officer, Julius Dettmann, who had made the tip-off, only that it came from a "reliable source" and was unable to provide any information that would further a police investigation. Silberbauer's confession helped discredit claims that The Diary of Anne Frank was a forgery. Given Otto Frank's crucial declaration that Silberbauer had obviously acted on orders and behaved correctly and without cruelty during the arrest, judicial investigation of Silberbauer was dropped, and he was able to continue in his career as a police officer. Silberbauer died in 1972. Silberbauer's statements in 1963 have been highly contradictory and considered unreliable, so it is not certain that the anonymous phone call ever took place. Silberbauer and his team were not involved in tracking down hidden Jews but in financial crimes and the company at Prinsengracht 263 was also involved in these, having to source supplies from the black market to feed the eight people in the secret annex. In March 1944, two company employees, Hendrik Daatzelaar and Martin Brouwer (named D and B in the diary), were arrested in possession of 8000 ration cards and it is very likely that the raid which took place in August was a consequence of this. When officers entered the business, they inspected every crate, bag of seeds and can of beans in a search that lasted nearly two hours until they came across the revolving bookcase, moving it and discovering the hidden passageway.

== Fellow prisoners ==
- Janny Brandes-Brilleslijper (24 October 1916 – 15 August 2003) and her sister Lientje (13 December 1912 – 31 August 1988) were Anne and Margot's fellow prisoners in all three camps. Both had trained as nurse aides and were among the last people to see Anne and Margot Frank alive. After the war, Janny and Lientje were freed and Janny contacted Otto about his daughters' deaths.

== See also ==
- The Diary of a Young Girl
- The Last Seven Months of Anne Frank
- Yoko Moriwaki

== Bibliography ==
- Lee, Carol Ann (2000). The Biography of Anne Frank – Roses from the Earth. Viking. ISBN 0-7089-9174-2.
- Müller, Melissa; Rita Kimber and Robert Kimber (translators), with a note from Miep Gies. Anne Frank: The Biography. Metropolitan books, 2000. ISBN 0-7475-4523-5.
- Anne Frank. The Diary of Anne Frank: The Revised Critical Edition, edited by Harry Paape, David Barnouw, and Gerrold Van der Stroom (Netherlands Institute for War Documentation, NIOD), translated by Arnold J. Pomerans, compiled by H. J. J. Hardy, second edition. Doubleday 2003.ISBN 0-385-50847-6.
- Eva Schloss, with Evelyn Julia Kent. Eva's Story. Castle-Kent, 1988. ISBN 0-9523716-9-3
- Jacqueline van Maarsen. My Friend Anne Frank. Vantage Press, 1996. ISBN 0-533-12013-6
- Dutch Jewry Search
- Sawyer, Kem Knapp. Anne Frank: A Biography of a Lifetime.
- Lindwer, Willy. The Last Seven Months of Anne Frank. Random House, 1991. ISBN 0-385-42360-8
