= Lisa Jacobs (actress) =

British actress

- Occupation: Actress
- Known for: Playing Anne Frank in The Attic: The Hiding of Anne Frank
- Notable work: The Attic: The Hiding of Anne Frank, Laura's Happy Adventures, Alex Builds His Farm
- Website: Lisa Jacobs at IMDb

Lisa Jacobs is a British actress who is best known for playing Jewish diarist Anne Frank in the 1988 television film, The Attic: The Hiding of Anne Frank. She was nominated for the Primetime Emmy Award for Outstanding Supporting Actress in a Miniseries or a Movie for her role in this movie. The film also starred Mary Steenburgen as Miep Gies.

Jacobs has appeared in a number of other films, television films, and television series, including Minder s8 e12. She provided her voice in the UK versions of the video games Laura's Happy Adventures and Alex Builds His Farm. She also acts in stage.

She met actor Steven Mackintosh while they were appearing on stage together, and they married in 1989. They live in North London with their two daughters, one of whom is actress Martha Mackintosh.
