= Opekta =

Former German pectin and spice company

An Opekta advertising poster from Anne Frank's room in the Secret Annexe. "Nù zelf Jam maken met Opekta", roughly "Now make homemade Jam with Opekta"

Opekta was a German pectin and spice company that existed between 1928 and 1995. It is notable for its Dutch operation being based in the building at Prinsengracht 263 that later became the Anne Frank House. Opekta was based in Cologne and expanded into the Netherlands in 1933, at which time Otto Frank moved from Germany to Amsterdam to become managing director of the new Dutch operation. Otto Frank was in charge of the manufacturing and distribution of the pectin-based gelling preparations, to be used in jam making.

The company continued to trade from the same building while Frank, his family (including his youngest daughter Anne Frank) and several other Jews hid from persecution stemming from the Nazi Occupation of the Netherlands during the Second World War.

== History ==
The Opekta company was based in Cologne, Germany, founded and owned by the Austrian chemists Robert Feix and Richard Fackeldey.

- 1933: The German businessman Otto Frank, then still residing in Germany, was appointed to aid their expansion into the Netherlands. Frank had already considered moving his family to the Netherlands following the election of Adolf Hitler and the rise of Nazism, so he accepted the post and moved alone to Amsterdam to find premises for the company. He had briefly managed a large rival firm, Pomosin, which traded pectin to factories from the Dutch town of Utrecht but decided that retail trade would be more lucrative in the Dutch market than wholesale. His franchise for the Amsterdam branch of Opekta was established in September 1933. In December 1933, his wife, Edith Frank-Holländer, found an apartment for the family on Merwedeplein in southern Amsterdam.
- 1934: The company became too cramped and moved to the Amsterdam address of 400 Singel. It moved once again to new premises located at 263 Prinsengracht. Victor Kugler, an ex-colleague from Pomosin, came on board almost immediately to help run the company. The workforce was small - apart from a junior clerk, the only other employee was a secretary, who left a few months after the company started trading. She was replaced by Miep Gies, whose duties extended from the secretarial to public relations and advertising.
- 1938: Gies appeared in a promotional film to promote the Opekta product, which was used to demonstrate to consumers how easy it was to use in cooking. That year, they were joined by two other employees, Hermann van Pels as an herb specialist and Johannes Kleiman as a bookkeeper. Bep Voskuijl, who had been the administration manager when the war broke out, had been taken on in the previous year, 1937.
- 1940: After the arrival of the German occupiers, the company was re-registered under the name of Victor Kugler to prevent it from being confiscated as a Jewish-owned business. Frank remained in charge but in secret.
- 1941: The company was renamed Gies & Co. and Frank resigned as they were forced into hiding in the secret annex within the building.
- 1942: Frank continued as a silent partner in the company. Their two-year confinement, aided by Kleiman, Kugler, Gies and Voskuijl, was famously chronicled by Frank's youngest daughter, Anne, in an autobiographical work, The Diary of a Young Girl, published posthumously in 1947.
- 1953: Frank retired as director of Opekta and was succeeded by Kleiman until he died in 1959.
- 1954: The building at 263 Prinsengracht was sold to developers and Opekta was given notice to vacate the premises. Anne Frank's diary had drawn readers to visit the premises by this time and a successful campaign saved the building from demolition.
- 1955: Opekta left the building
- 1960: The building re-opened as the Anne Frank House, a museum dedicated to the life and writings of Anne Frank.
- 1995: Dr. Oetker acquired the company in August.

== Sources ==
- Boonstra, Janrense; Rijnders, Marie-Jose (1992). Anne Frank House: a museum with a story.
- Lee, Carol Ann (2003). The Hidden Life of Otto Frank.
- Frank, Anne (2003). Barnow, David; et al. (eds.). The Diary of Anne Frank: The Critical Edition.
