= Eugene Hollander =

Hungarian-born Holocaust survivor

- Born: 14 December 1912; Huszt, Kingdom of Hungary, Austria-Hungary
- Died: 15 December 1996 (aged 84); New York City, U.S.
- Spouse: Monica
- Relatives: Edith Frank (cousin)

Eugene Hollander (14 December 1912 – 15 December 1996) was a Hungarian survivor of the Holocaust. He wrote a memoir, From the Hell of the Holocaust: A Survivor's Story, about his ordeal in Nazi Germany.

He was born in Huszt in December 1912, but raised in Técső, then part of the Kingdom of Hungary, but today in modern-day Ukraine. He was a first cousin of Edith Frank (née Hollander, Anne Frank's mother) who was the daughter of his maternal uncle and also the cousin-in-law of Otto Frank. Separated from his wife Monica for 14 months, they eventually reunited and moved to the United States. Hollander died in New York City in December 1996 at the age of 84. His widow, Monica, posthumously published his memoir in 2000. She died in 2014. The Eugene and Monica E. Hollander Foundation was a New York-based charity subsequently set established in their memory.

== Works ==
- Hollander, Eugene (2001). From the Hell of the Holocaust: A Survivor's Story. Ktav Pub Inc. ISBN 0-88125-687-0.
