= Margot Frank =

Older sister of Anne Frank and Holocaust victim (1926–1945)

- The last known photo of Margot Frank in May 1942, two months before she and her family went into hiding
- Born: Margot Betti Frank; 16 February 1926; Frankfurt am Main, Weimar Republic
- Died: c. February 1945 (aged 18–19); Bergen-Belsen concentration camp, Nazi Germany
- Cause of death: Typhus
- Education: Ludwig Richter Schule; Lyceum voor Meisjes; Jewish Lyceum; Municipal Grammar School; Municipal Lyceum
- Known for: Older sister of Anne Frank
- Parent(s): Otto Frank; Edith Holländer
- Relatives: Anne Frank (sister); Buddy Elias (cousin)

Margot Betti Frank (16 February 1926 – c. February 1945) was the elder daughter of Otto Frank and Edith Frank and the elder sister of Anne Frank. Margot's deportation order from the Gestapo hastened the Frank family into hiding. According Anne's diary, Margot kept a diary of her own, but no trace of it has ever been found. She died in the Bergen-Belsen concentration camp from a typhus outbreak.

== Early life and education ==
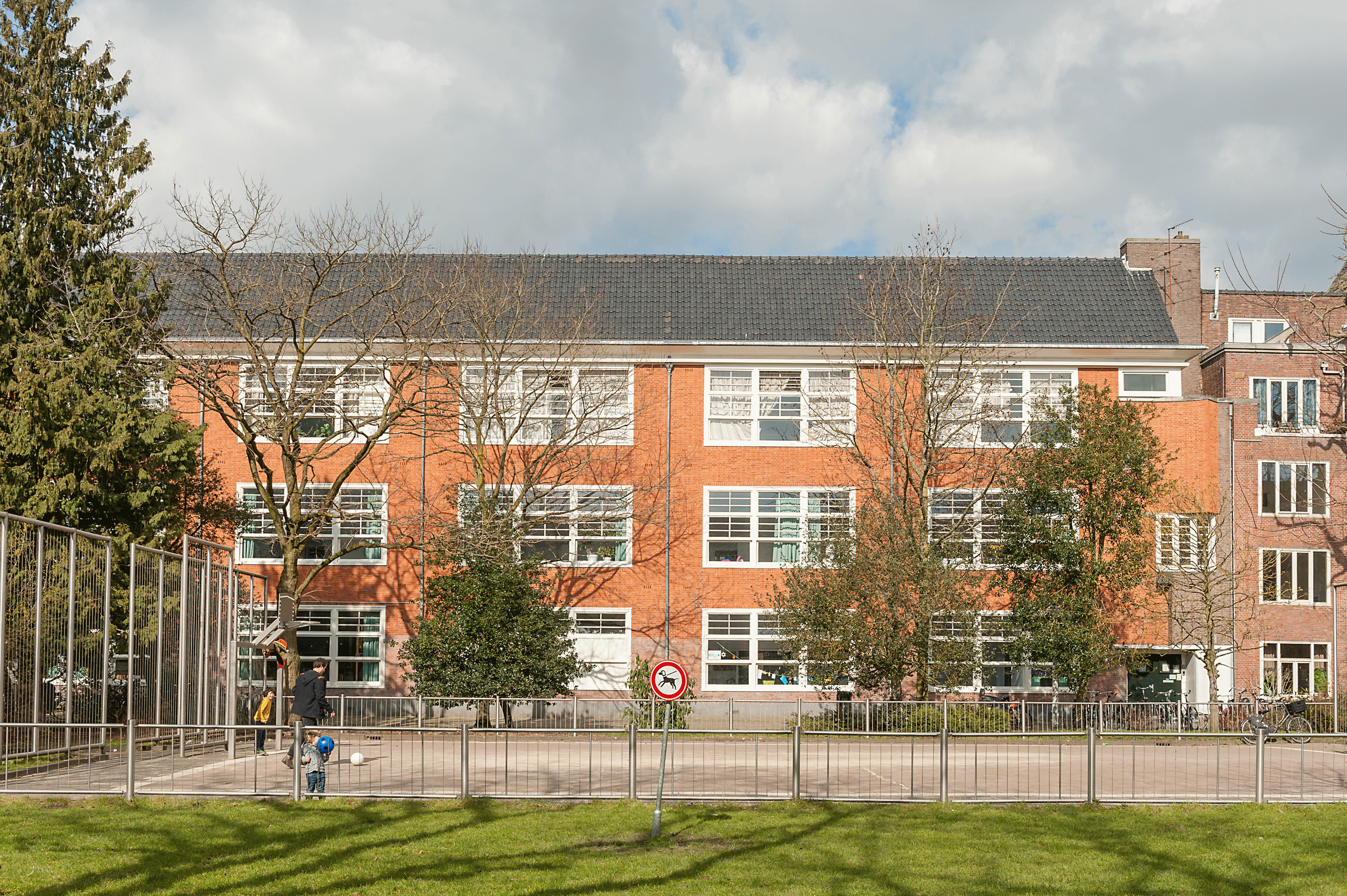
Jeker School in Amsterdam – The primary school of Margot Frank

Margot Betti Frank, named after her maternal aunt Bettina Holländer (1898–1914), was born in Frankfurt and lived in the outer suburbs of the city with her parents, Otto Frank and Edith Frank-Holländer, and also her younger sister Anne Frank. Edith and Otto were devoted parents who were interested in scholarly pursuits and had an extensive library; they encouraged the children to read. At the time her sister Anne was born, the family lived in a house at Marbachweg 307 in Frankfurt-Dornbusch, where they rented two floors. Margot and Anne played almost every day in the garden with the children of the neighborhood. They all had different backgrounds; Catholic, Protestant or Jewish. They shared a curiosity about each other's religious holidays. Margot was invited to the communion celebration of one of her friends, and the neighbors' children were sometimes invited to the Frank's celebration of Hanukkah. In 1931, the family moved to Ganghoferstrasse 24 in a fashionable liberal area of Dornbusch called the Dichterviertel (Poets' Quarter). Both houses still exist.

In the summer of 1932, the Nazis' paramilitary wing – Sturmabteilung (SA) – had marched through the streets of Frankfurt am Main wearing swastika armbands. These Brownshirts, as they were called because of the color of their uniforms, loudly sang: "When Jewish blood spurts from the knife, things will go well again". Upon hearing this, Anne's parents Edith and Otto discussed their concerns with each other. It was impossible for them to leave their homeland immediately because making a living abroad seemed incomprehensible.

Margot attended the Ludwig-Richter School in Frankfurt until the appointment of Adolf Hitler on January 30 of 1933, to the position of chancellor in Germany. His rise to power brought about an increase of anti-Jewish measures, among which was the expulsion of Jewish schoolchildren from non-denominational schools. In response to the rising tide of antisemitism, the family decided to follow the 63,000 other Jews who had left Germany that year and emigrate to Amsterdam in the Netherlands. Edith Frank and her daughters moved in with her mother in Aachen in the summer of 1933, while Otto Frank started his company Opekta in Amsterdam. Edith travelled back and forth between Aachen and Amsterdam in order to find accommodation in the Dutch capital. Margot moved to Amsterdam in December 1933, followed by Anne in February 1934. Margot was enrolled in an elementary school on Amsterdam's Jekerstraat, close to their new address on Merwedeplein, in the southern part of Amsterdam. Despite initial problems with the Dutch language, Margot became a star pupil. She achieved excellent academic results.

== German occupation ==
German armies invaded the Netherlands on 10 May 1940. Although the first anti-Jewish measures soon took effect, Margot and her sister were not immediately affected. But that changed in 1941, when they were no longer allowed to go to the cinema and were excluded from their sports clubs. Jewish children were no longer allowed to attend the school of their choice. After the summer of 1941, Margot and her sister had to attend a Jewish school with only Jewish students and teachers.

At the Jewish Lyceum, Margot displayed the studiousness and intelligence which had made her excel at her previous schools, and was remembered by former pupils as virtuous, reserved, and very obedient. Margot had a large circle of friends and enjoyed rowing and playing tennis in her spare time. In her diary, Anne recounted instances of their mother suggesting she emulate Margot, and although she wrote of admiring her sister in some respects for being handsome and clever, Anne sought to define her own individuality without role models. Margot is also shown to have a much better relationship with their mother, and had a much more modest and tolerant nature as opposed to Anne, who was determined and often spoke her mind.

Although her sister Anne also took Hebrew classes at a later point, Anne was, like her father, not as much interested in the Jewish tradition as Margot. Margot followed the example of her mother, who became involved in Amsterdam's Liberal Jewish community. She took Hebrew classes, attended synagogue, and in 1941 joined a Dutch Zionist club for young people who wanted to immigrate to Palestine to found a Jewish state, where, as Anne Frank described in her diary, she wished to become a midwife.

In the summer of 1942, the systematic deportation of Jews from the Netherlands started. On 5 July 1942, Margot received a notice to report to a labor camp in Germany and the next day went into hiding with her family in the secret annex of her father's company on Prinsengracht, in the city center of Amsterdam. They were later joined by four other Jewish refugees (Hermann, Auguste and Peter van Pels and Fritz Pfeffer) and remained hidden for two years until they were discovered on 4 August 1944.

== Life in hiding ==
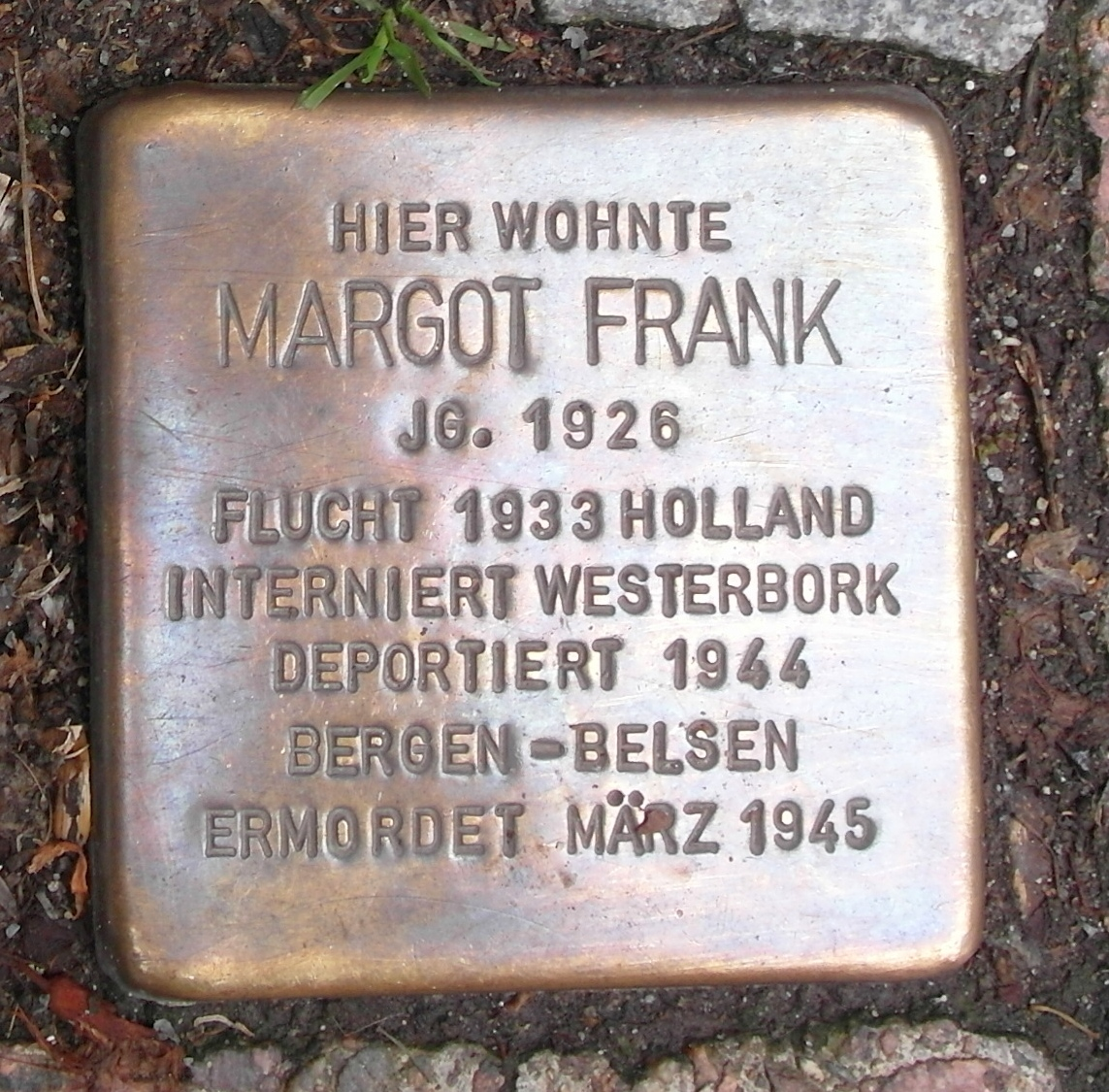
Stolperstein for Margot Frank at the Pastorplatz in Aachen, Germany

Margot was sixteen years old when she went into hiding. At first she shared a bedroom with Anne, but when Fritz Pfeffer moved in to the Secret Annex in November 1942, Margot slept in her parents' bedroom. Margot Frank and her family were only able to live in hiding because four office workers from her father's company were willing to take care of them at the risk of their own lives. The helpers were Miep Gies, Bep Voskuijl, Johannes Kleiman and Victor Kugler to whom are added Johannes Hendrik Voskuijl (Bep's father, former warehouse manager and builder of the revolving bookcase) and Jan Gies (Miep's husband). There were strict rules so that the employees in the warehouse, visitors to the company and neighbours would not notice nor suspect the eight people in hiding in the Secret Annex. Margot and the other people in hiding had to be completely silent during working hours and were not able to use any water. During the day, Margot read a lot and like Anne and Peter, she spent much time studying. Margot took a correspondence course in Latin, not under her own name, but under the name of Bep Voskuijl, one of the helpers. Early in her diary, Anne states that Margot also had a diary.

== Arrest and death ==
Along with the other occupants of the Annex, Margot Frank was arrested by the Sicherheitsdienst on 4 August 1944, and detained in the RSHA headquarters overnight before being taken to a cell in a nearby prison for three days, the Huis van Bewaring (House of Detention I) on the Weteringschans. According to Victor Kugler, while being arrested, Margot was weeping silently.

It is not known whether an informant or a chance discovery by authorities ended their period of refuge. The group, along with Kugler and Kleiman, were arrested by Karl Silberbauer, whose team was usually tasked with investigating financial crimes and not with searching for hidden Jews. This element, together with the fact that the officers inspected all the crates, bags and jars before to find the revolving bookcase indicates that perhaps they were not aware about the hiders. Miep Gies and Bep Voskuijl were not arrested with the group. Gies managed to excuse herself by saying she knew nothing of those in hiding, and Johannes Kleiman gave Voskuijl his wallet with the request to take it to his friend Derk Kollen who had a pharmacy around the corner on the Leliegracht, a pre-arranged signal to inform Kleiman's family that there was a problem, and she was able to leave the building unhindered because no police officers were guarding the outside at that moment.

The group was first taken to the Sicherheitsdienst (SD) headquarters on Euterpestraat in Amsterdam for questioning, then they were taken to the Huis van Bewaring (House of Detention I) on the Weteringschans in Amsterdam. They remained here for a few days and then, by train, on 8 August, to the Dutch Westerbork transit camp. Victor Kugler and Johannes Kleiman were taken to a different detention center on the Amstelveenseweg and later transferred to the Kamp Amersfoort. As the Frank family had failed to respond to Margot's call-up notice in 1942 and had been discovered in hiding, they (along with Fritz Pfeffer and the van Pels family) were declared criminals by the camp's officials and detained in its punishment block to be sentenced to hard labor in the battery dismantling plant. They remained there until they were selected for Westerbork's last deportation to Auschwitz on 3 September 1944. Bloeme Evers-Emden, an Amsterdam native who had known Margot and Anne from the Jewish Lyceum, recalled that Margot and Edith were selected for a transport to the Liebau labor camp in Upper Silesia, but Anne was prohibited from joining because she had developed scabies; Margot and Edith opted to stay behind with Anne and Bloeme went on without them. Another selection forcibly separated Edith from her daughters when on 30 October, Margot and Anne were transferred to the Bergen-Belsen concentration camp. Left behind, Edith died in Auschwitz on 6 January 1945.

Margot Frank died in February or March 1945 at the age of 19 from typhus; Anne succumbed to the same disease a day or two later. Janny Brandes-Brilleslijper and her sister Lientje buried them together in one of Bergen-Belsen's mass graves; in July 1945, once Janny came back to the Netherlands and recovered from typhus, she wrote to Otto Frank and informed him that both of his daughters had died.

In a documentary, Janny Brandes-Brilleslijper said:

“First, Margot had fallen out of bed onto the stone floor,”... “She couldn’t get up anymore. Anne died a day later. Three days before her death from typhus was when she had thrown away all of her clothes during dreadful hallucinations. That happened just before the liberation,”

Otto Frank was the only person to survive out of the eight people who went into hiding. When he returned to Amsterdam in June 1945 he was given Anne's diaries by Miep Gies (who had saved parts of them, just like the younger secretary Bep Voskuijl), which he published in 1947 as a remembrance to her. Along with Anne, Margot Frank also wrote a diary during their time in hiding (Anne mentioned her sister's diary in her own) but Margot's diary was never found. However, many authors wrote fan-based diaries of Margot such as the novel The Silent Sister by Mazal Alouf-Mizrahi. Letters written by both Frank sisters to American pen pals were published in 2003. Buddy Elias (1925–2015) was Margot's and Anne's first cousin and last surviving close relative.
