= Edith Frank =

Mother of Anne Frank (1900–1945)

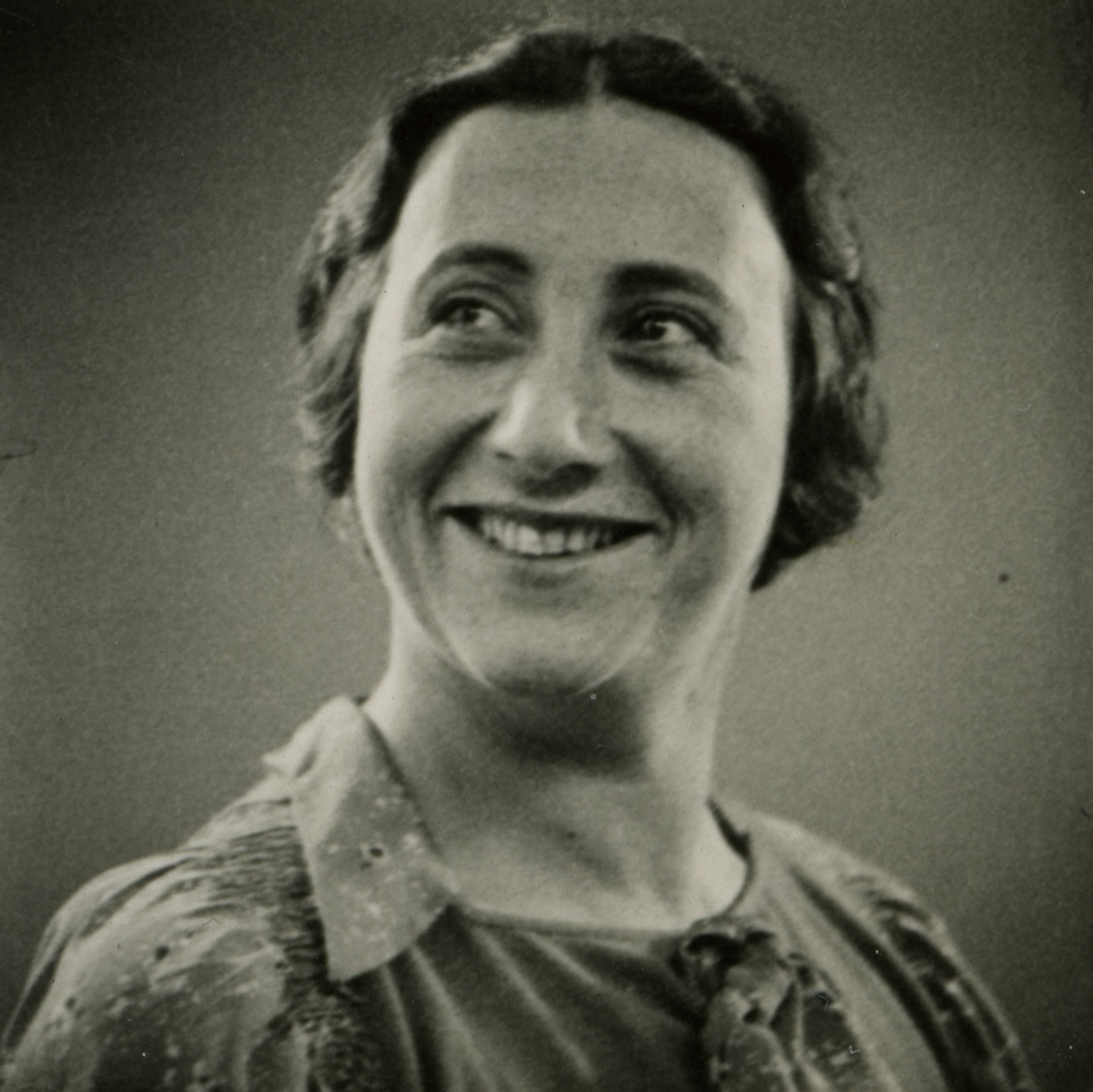
- Edith in 1939
- Born: Edith Holländer; 16 January 1900; Aachen, Germany
- Died: 6 January 1945 (aged 44); Auschwitz-Birkenau, Germany (modern Poland)
- Known for: Mother of Anne and Margot Frank
- Spouse: Otto Frank (m. 1925)
- Children: Margot; Anne
- Relatives: Eugene Hollander (cousin)

Edith Frank (née Holländer; 16 January 1900 – 6 January 1945) was the mother of Holocaust diarist Anne Frank and her older sister Margot. After the family were discovered in hiding in Amsterdam during the German occupation, she was transported to Auschwitz-Birkenau concentration camp, where she died of weakness and disease.

== Biography ==
=== Early life ===
Edith was the youngest of four children, having been born into a German Jewish family in Aachen, Germany. Her father, Abraham Holländer (1860–1928) was a successful businessman in industrial equipment who was active in the Aachen Jewish community together with Edith's mother, Rosa Holländer (1866–1942). The ancestors of the Holländer family lived in Amsterdam at the start of the 18th century, emigrating from the Netherlands to Germany around 1800. Edith's last name, Holländer, is German for "Dutchman" (literally: "Hollander"). Edith had two older brothers, Julius (1894–1967) and Walter (1897–1968), and an older sister, Bettina. Bettina died at the age of 16 from appendicitis when Edith was 14. Both Julius and Walter immigrated to the United States, surviving afterwards. The Holländer family adhered to Jewish dietary laws and was considered to be religious. Nevertheless, Edith attended the Evangelical Higher Girls' School and passed her school-leaving exams (Abitur) in 1916. Afterwards, she worked for the family company. In her free time, she read copiously, played tennis, went swimming and had a large circle of friends.

=== Family ===
She met Otto Frank in 1924 and they married on his 36th birthday, 12 May 1925, at Aachen's synagogue. They had two daughters born in Frankfurt, Margot, born 16 February 1926, followed by Anne, born 12 June 1929. At the time Anne was born, the family lived in a house at Marbachweg 307 in Frankfurt-Dornbusch, where they rented two floors. Her daughters played almost every day in the garden with the children in the neighborhood. They all had different backgrounds; Catholic, Protestant or Jewish. They shared a curiosity about each other's religious holidays. Margot was invited to the communion celebration of one of her friends, and the neighbors' children were sometimes invited to the Franks' celebration of Hanukkah. Later the family moved to Ganghoferstrasse 24 in a fashionable liberal area of Dornbusch called the Dichterviertel (Poets' Quarter). Both houses still exist.

In the summer of 1932, the Nazi Party' paramilitary wing – Sturmabteilung (SA) – marched through the streets of Frankfurt am Main wearing Haken Kreuz armbands. These Brownshirts, as they were called because of the color of their uniforms, loudly sang: "When Jewish blood spurts from the knife, things will go well again". Upon hearing this, Edith and Otto discussed their concerns with each other. It was impossible for them to leave their homeland immediately because making a living abroad was an issue.

=== Immigration ===
The appointment of Adolf Hitler on 30 January 1933, to the position of chancellor in Germany and the following rise of antisemitism and introduction of discriminatory laws in Germany forced the family to emigrate to Amsterdam in 1933. In the Dutch capital Otto established a branch of his spice and pectin distribution company, called Opekta. Edith found emigration to the Netherlands difficult. The family lived in confined conditions and she struggled with the new language. She remained in contact with her family and friends in Germany, but also made new friends in Amsterdam, most of them fellow German refugees. Edith became involved in Amsterdam's Liberal Jewish community, and attended synagogue with her oldest daughter, Margot, on a regular basis. On Friday evenings, the Franks often went to visit German-Jewish friends to eat together, and many Jewish holidays were also celebrated. Edith was an open-minded woman who educated her daughters in a modern way. Her older brothers Walter and Julius immigrated to the United States after 1938, and her mother, Rosa Holländer-Stern, left Aachen in 1939 to join the Frank family in Amsterdam, where she died in January 1942.

Anne Frank's cousin Bernhard ("Buddy") Elias has said that "Edith never felt well in Holland. Edith was German, and she missed Germany. She did not learn Dutch very well. She did not feel at home in Amsterdam."

=== Persecution and death ===
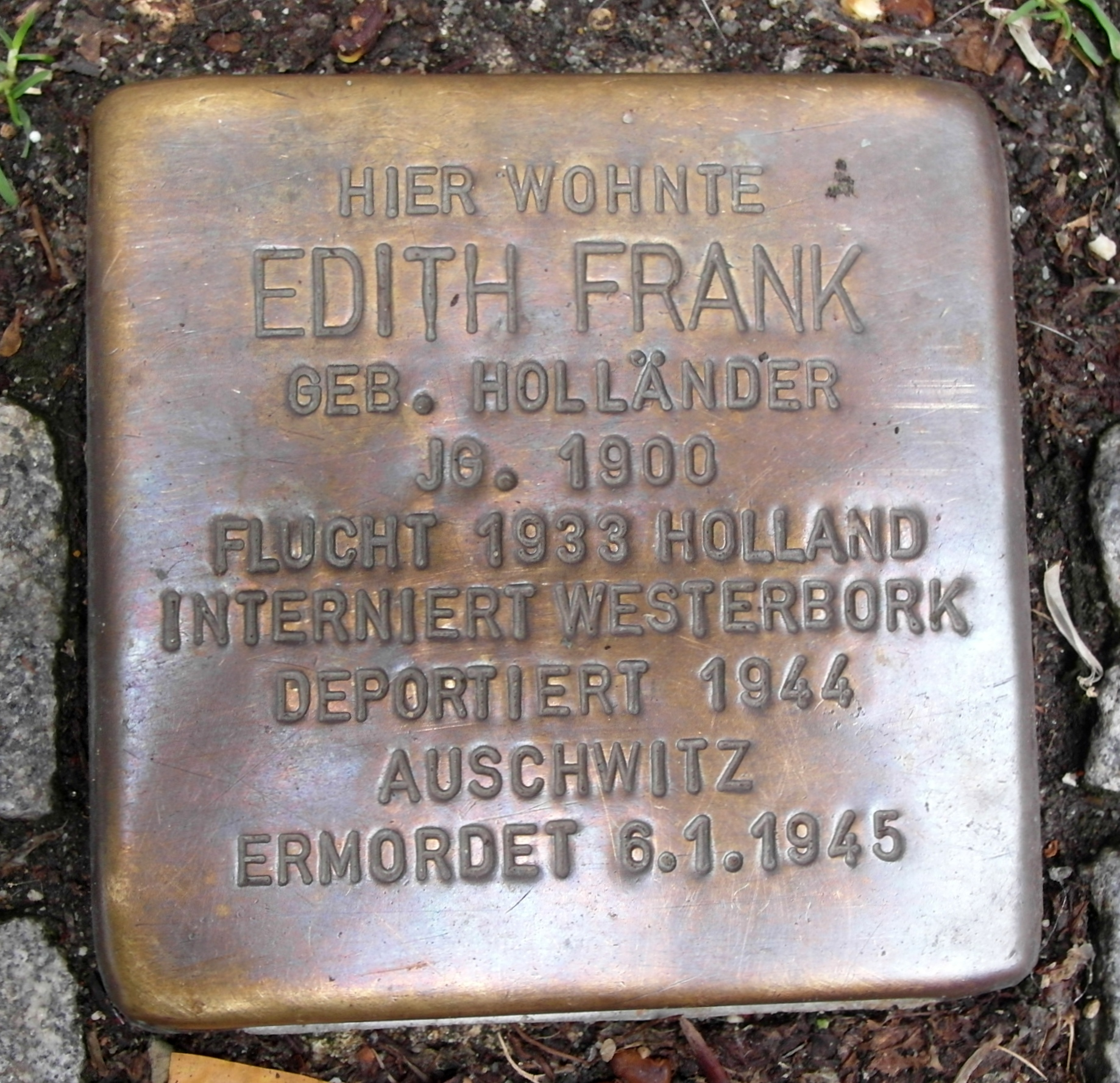
A Stolperstein for Frank at the Pastorplatz in Aachen, Germany

In 1940, Nazi Germany invaded the Netherlands and began their persecution of the country's Jews. Edith's children were removed from their schools, and her husband Otto Frank was forced by the Germans to give up his companies Opekta and Pectacon. Otto made his businesses look "Aryan" by transferring control to his Dutch colleagues Johannes Kleiman and Victor Kugler, who helped the family when they went into hiding at the company premises on 6 July 1942.

The two-year period the Frank family spent in hiding with four other people (their friends Hermann van Pels, his wife Auguste van Pels and his son Peter van Pels, and Miep Gies's dentist Fritz Pfeffer) was chronicled in Anne Frank's posthumously published diary. In her diary, the adolescent Anne frequently writes about the disagreements, conflicts, mutual lack of understanding, and the pessimism of her mother, which she wants to disassociate herself from. However, she repeatedly also describes her mother as an understanding and loyal woman who stands up for her daughters and protects them against verbal attacks from the other inhabitants. On 2 January 1944, Anne wrote in her diary: "The period of tearfully passing judgement on Mother is over. I've grown wiser and Mother's nerves are a bit steadier. Most of the time I manage to hold my tongue when I'm annoyed, and she does too." The diary ended three days before they were anonymously betrayed and arrested on 4 August 1944. After detainment in the Gestapo headquarters on the Euterpestraat and three days in prison on the Weteringschans, Edith and those with whom she had been in hiding were transported to the Westerbork transit camp. From there, they were deported to Auschwitz concentration camp on 3 September 1944, on the last train to be dispatched from Westerbork to Auschwitz.

Edith and her daughters were separated from Otto upon arrival, and they never saw him again. Edith looked for ways of keeping her children alive. Survivors later described them as an inseparable trio. On 30 October, another selection separated Edith from Anne and Margot. Edith was selected for the gas chambers, and her daughters were transported to Bergen-Belsen. Edith escaped with a friend to another section of the camp, where she remained through the winter. Edith became very ill and was taken to the sick barracks, where she died of weakness and disease on 6 January 1945, aged 44. three weeks before the Red Army liberated the camp. Her daughters outlived her by one month.

== Her daughter's diary ==
Otto Frank was the sole member of his family to survive the Holocaust and returned to Amsterdam in June 1945. One of the helpers, Miep Gies, gave him Anne's diary papers. She had saved parts of them, just like the other female secretary, Bep Voskuijl. When Otto Frank decided to edit his daughter's diary for publication, he was sure that his wife had come in for particular criticism because of her often difficult relationship with Anne, and he deleted some of the more heated comments out of respect for his wife and other residents of the Secret Annex. Nevertheless, Anne's portrait of an unsympathetic and sarcastic mother was duplicated in the dramatizations of the book. Anne's portrayal of her mother was countered by the memories of those who had known her as a modest, distant woman who tried to treat her adolescent children as her equals.

In 1999, the discovery of previously unknown pages excised by Otto showed that Anne had discerned that, although Edith very much loved Otto, Otto – though very devoted to Edith – was not in love with her; and that this understanding was leading Anne to develop a new sense of empathy for her mother's situation. By the time Edith and her daughters were in Auschwitz, Bloeme Evers-Emden, an Auschwitz survivor interviewed by Willy Lindwer in The Last Seven Months of Anne Frank (p. 129), observed that "they were always together, mother and daughters. It is certain that they gave each other a great deal of support. All the things a teenager might think of her mother were no longer of any significance."

After their arrest and transfer to camp Westerbork the relationship between Anne and her mother improved as can be seen from a letter sent by Otto Frank to his cousin Milly on 16 November 1945:

It does not grieve me what she writes (about her mother) and I know quite well that there are several things she did not see and she would have changed her ideas. In fact she was on very good terms with her mother at the camp (Westerbork) later.

In 1968, Otto Frank wrote in his 'memoirs to Anne' about his wife: she truly was an excellent mother, who put her children above all else.
