= Bep Voskuijl =

Dutch secretary who helped hide Anne Frank (1919–1983)

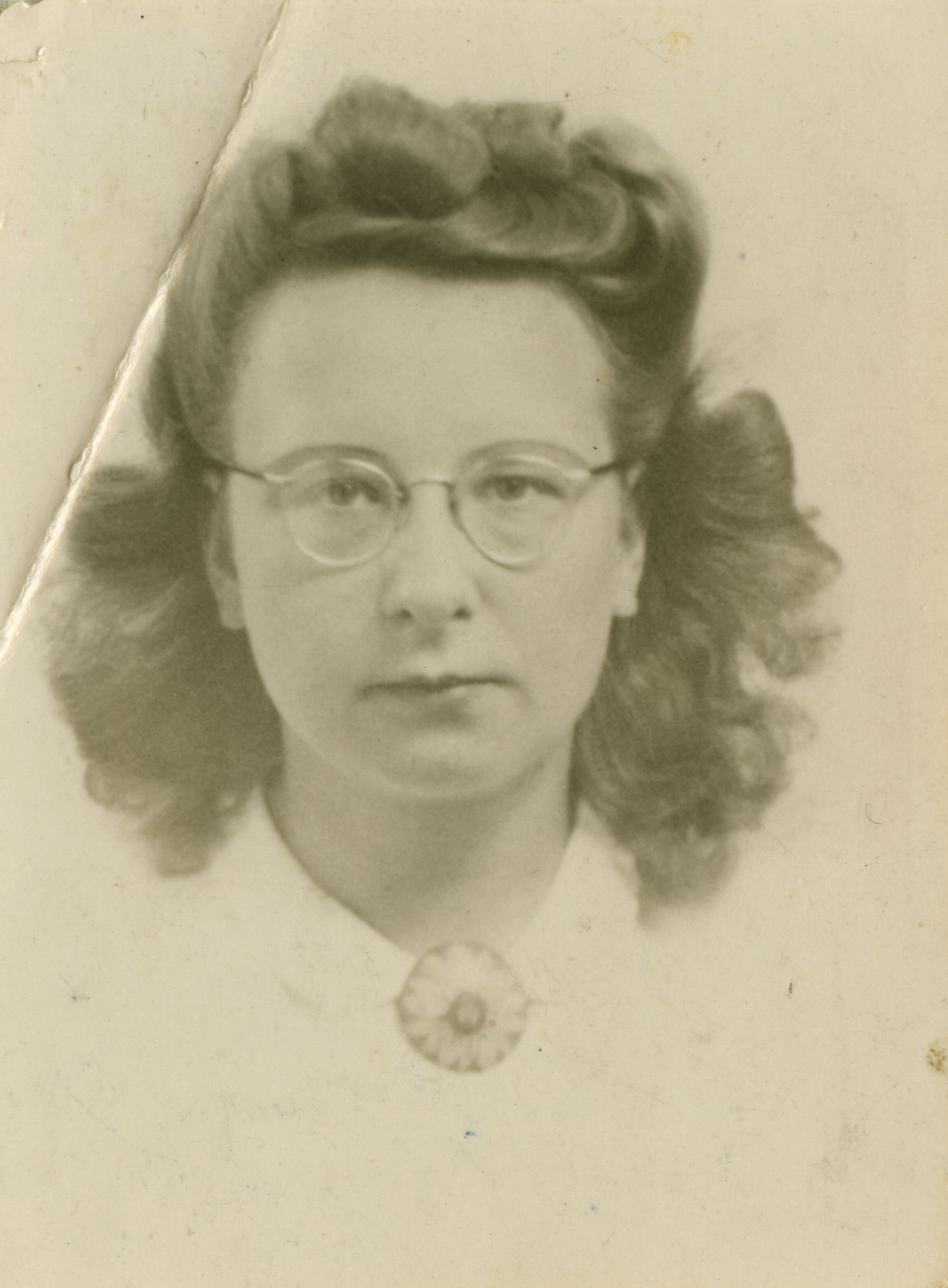
- Voskuijl in 1945
- Born: Elisabeth Voskuijl; 5 July 1919; Amsterdam, Netherlands
- Died: 6 May 1983 (aged 63); Amsterdam, Netherlands
- Other name: Elli Vossen
- Occupation: Secretary of Opekta
- Spouse: Cornelis van Wijk (m. 1946)
- Children: 4
- Father: Johannes Hendrik Voskuijl

Elisabeth "Bep" Voskuijl (Dutch pronunciation: [eːˈlisaːbɛd bɛp ˈfɔskœyl]; (Note: In isolation, Elisabeth and Voskuijl are pronounced [eːˈlisaːbɛt] and [ˈvɔskœyl], respectively.) 5 July 1919 – 6 May 1983) was a resident of Amsterdam who helped conceal Anne Frank and her family from Nazi persecution during the occupation of the Netherlands. In the early versions of Het Achterhuis, known in English as The Diary of a Young Girl, she was given the pseudonym "Elli Vossen".

== Early life ==
Bep was born in Amsterdam. She was the eldest of the eight children of carpenter Johannes Voskuijl and homemaker Christina Sodenkamp. When still a teenager, Bep worked as a chambermaid, waitress and shop assistant in order to earn money to support the large Voskuijl family.

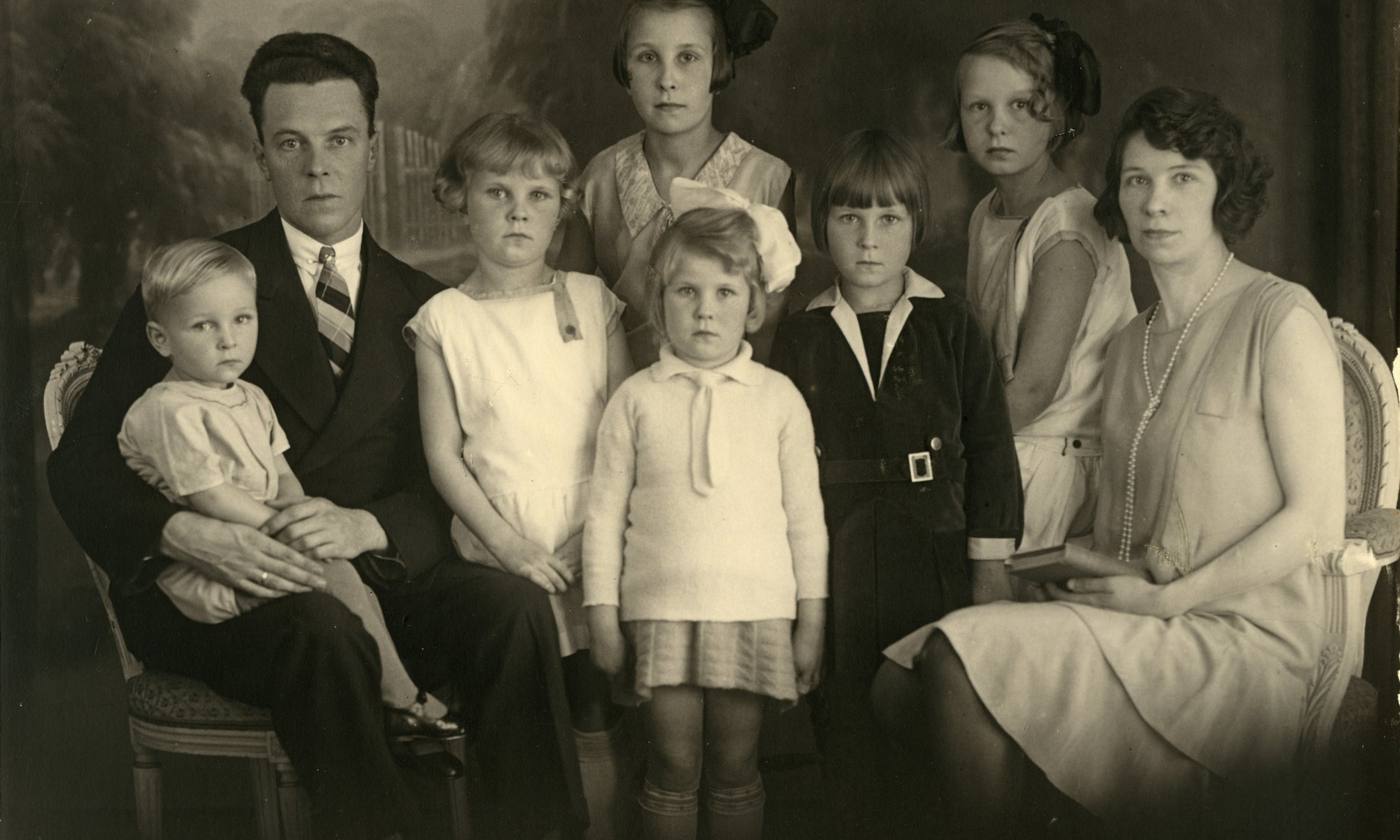
Bep stands by her mother in this c 1932 family group

In 1937, Bep enrolled in the Instituut Schoevers, the evening school for girls and women who wanted to learn secretarial work. Bep excelled at her courses in German, stenography and accounting. Soon after, she was hired by Otto Frank as a secretary for his company, Opekta, based at 263 Prinsengracht, the address which would become the Frank family's hiding place. She was eighteen when she started working and was the youngest employee in the office. Later, her unemployed father, who had health problems, became the Opekta warehouse supervisor. Her colleague, fellow "helper" and friend, Miep Gies recalled after the war: ‘Mr Frank liked her, and so did I. Right away Bep and I were a good team and became friendly,'.

Bep became close with Otto Frank's wife Edith Holländer and their daughters Margot and Anne. She also made friends with Miep Gies and got acquainted with Victor Kugler and Johannes Kleiman, all employees at Opekta who would later become protectors of the people in the Secret Annex.

== Helper in the Secret Annex ==
On Sunday 5 July 1942, Bep celebrated her 23rd birthday. The next day, when she went to work, the Frank family had already moved into the Secret Annex. For the next two years, her life was governed almost completely by her care for the people in hiding. Bep was responsible for milk and bread, and Bep's sister sewed garments such as pants and blouses for the people in hiding. She also ordered correspondence courses for those in hiding, such as shorthand and Latin.

Bep was lucky to have the support of her father, who was soon informed of the Secret Annex. Johannes Voskuijl kept an eye on the situation in the warehouse, as the other employees were not let in on the secret. Johannes would also make sure that the waste from the hiding place disappeared unnoticed in the morning. Furthermore, in August 1942, Voskuijl built the famous bookcase that concealed the entrance to the Secret Annex. Voskuijl and his daughter discussed the Annex a lot with each other, as they kept silent to the rest of the Voskuijl family for safety reasons. Bep also managed to keep her fiancé Bertus Hulsman ignorant for twenty-five months.

=== Friendship with Anne Frank ===
Bep got on well with Anne and the feeling was mutual. In his memoirs, Otto Frank remembered about the friendship between his younger daughter and Bep that "the two (...) were frequently whispering to each other in a corner". Anne considered Bep, who was ten years older, to be one of the "young people" and was very curious about Bep's experiences: the films she was seeing, but also how things were going between Bep and her fiancé. For lunch, Bep joined the people in the Secret Annex, because at home there was not always enough to eat for ten people. In her diary Anne characterized her as follows: "Bep has a healthy appetite. Leaves nothing on her plate and is not picky and choosy. She is easy to please and that is just what pleases us. Cheerful and good-tempered, willing and good-natured, these are her characteristics."

In October 1942, Anne convinced Bep to spend a night in the Secret Annex, but Bep did not sleep a wink. "To tell you the truth, I was terrified. Every time I heard a tree creaking in the October wind or a car driving along the canal, I grew afraid. I was grateful when morning came, and I was able to get back to work." During the evening of her stay, Bep had become acquainted with Anne's talent for writing, when she was given a few stories to read that Anne had come up with. In a letter to Otto Frank, she later remembered: "I couldn't believe what I was hearing. I could not believe that Anne had written those words. I can still see Margot's face: 'Yes, Anne wrote these all by herself.' Then I thought, you've got to be older to be able to write such a thing, or perhaps it was her inner self that came out." Later, Anne would occasionally show Bep diary passages, although she carefully screened her notes from the eyes of the other hiders. Bep provided Anne with carbon paper she brought from the office.

In addition to her care for the people in hiding, Bep also had to take care of her father. In the spring of 1943, he became seriously ill and was no longer able to work for the company. On 15 June 1943, Anne Frank wrote in her diary: "It is a disaster for us that good old Voskuyl won't be able to keep us in touch with all that goes on, and all he hears in the warehouse. He was our best helper and security adviser; we miss him very much indeed."

=== After the arrest ===
During the Gestapo raid, Bep managed to escape with a few documents which would have incriminated the black market contacts of the Secret Annex helpers. She went into hiding for a week and then got back to the office, after which she entered the Secret Annex and saved parts of Anne's diaries, that were scattered over the floor. A few days earlier, Miep had already saved Anne's red-checkered diary and a few other notebooks.

== After World War II ==
Bep was honored in later years for her activities during the Second World War, but disliked publicity and gave few interviews about her association with Anne Frank. She and others helping the Frank family while they were in hiding were honored by Yad Vashem, a Holocaust Memorial and Research Center in Jerusalem, as Righteous Among the Nations.

Bep followed the news about Anne's diary closely and composed scrap books with newspaper articles and photo reports. In 1959, she also testified in Otto Frank's lawsuit against two Holocaust deniers in the German city of Lübeck. Together with Miep Gies, she gave a statement to confirm that Anne had written her diary during the hiding.

That same year, Bep met with Queen Juliana at the Dutch premiere of the Hollywood film The Diary of Anne Frank by George Stevens. In a letter to Otto Frank, Bep admitted she would much prefer to "distance herself from everything (...). Also, the pleasant things, such as invitations here and there, are nerve-racking before and after. You know, a loss for words plays the main role here. I know that you all mean well and certainly appreciate it and don't want to break with anyone in our Opekta circle. (...) I would do everything in my power to uphold the symbol of the idealized Anne, which for me (...) is combined with always thinking about what has happened, what I witnessed. This great pain never leaves my heart."

Bep kept in contact with Otto Frank even after his move to Switzerland and new marriage. Otto knew that Bep had troubles making ends meet and did his best to help her, too. He occasionally lent money to her. Bep also corresponded with Victor Kugler, who moved to Canada after the war. In 1978, she visited him and his wife Loes (Lucy) van Langen in Toronto.

Bep Voskuijl died in Amsterdam on 6 May 1983, due to a traumatic aortic rupture. She was 63 years old. In an article in Dutch national newspaper De Telegraaf, Miep Gies was quoted, stating that "the special thing about Bep was that she was so humble. She was heroic without bravura, simply assumed that the hiders in the Annex must be helped. For her, that wasn't a difficult choice to make."

== Biography ==
In 2015, the Belgian journalist Jeroen De Bruyn and Joop van Wijk, Bep Voskuijl's youngest son, released their biography Bep Voskuijl, het zwijgen voorbij. Een biografie van de jongste helpster van het Achterhuis. They were the first ones to provide in-depth information on Bep Voskuijl's life, such as her aid to the people in the Secret Annex, her relationship with Anne Frank and her postwar life, which was highly influenced by her war past. In Belgium and the Netherlands, the biography received much media attention, mainly because the authors claimed that Bep's sister Nelly (1923–2001) could be seen as a suspect of the betrayal of the Secret Annex. According to De Bruyn and van Wijk, Nelly worked for the Germans during the war and had several German soldiers among her friends. She also had a relationship with an Austrian non-commissioned officer.

According to Bertus Hulsman, Bep's former fiancé, who was interviewed by the authors, Nelly knew that her father and sister hid Jews. The authors underline that Karl Silberbauer, the SS man who arrested the people of the Secret Annex, later claimed that the infamous call to the Germans was made by a female. They find it curious that Bep was strongly convinced of stockroom manager Willem van Maaren's guilt, but changed her mind and even refused to cooperate with the new investigation when Simon Wiesenthal tracked down Silberbauer in 1963. After this period, Bep started avoiding the media.

== See also ==
- Anne Frank House
- People associated with Anne Frank
