= Miep Gies =

Dutch citizen who hid Anne Frank (1909–2010)

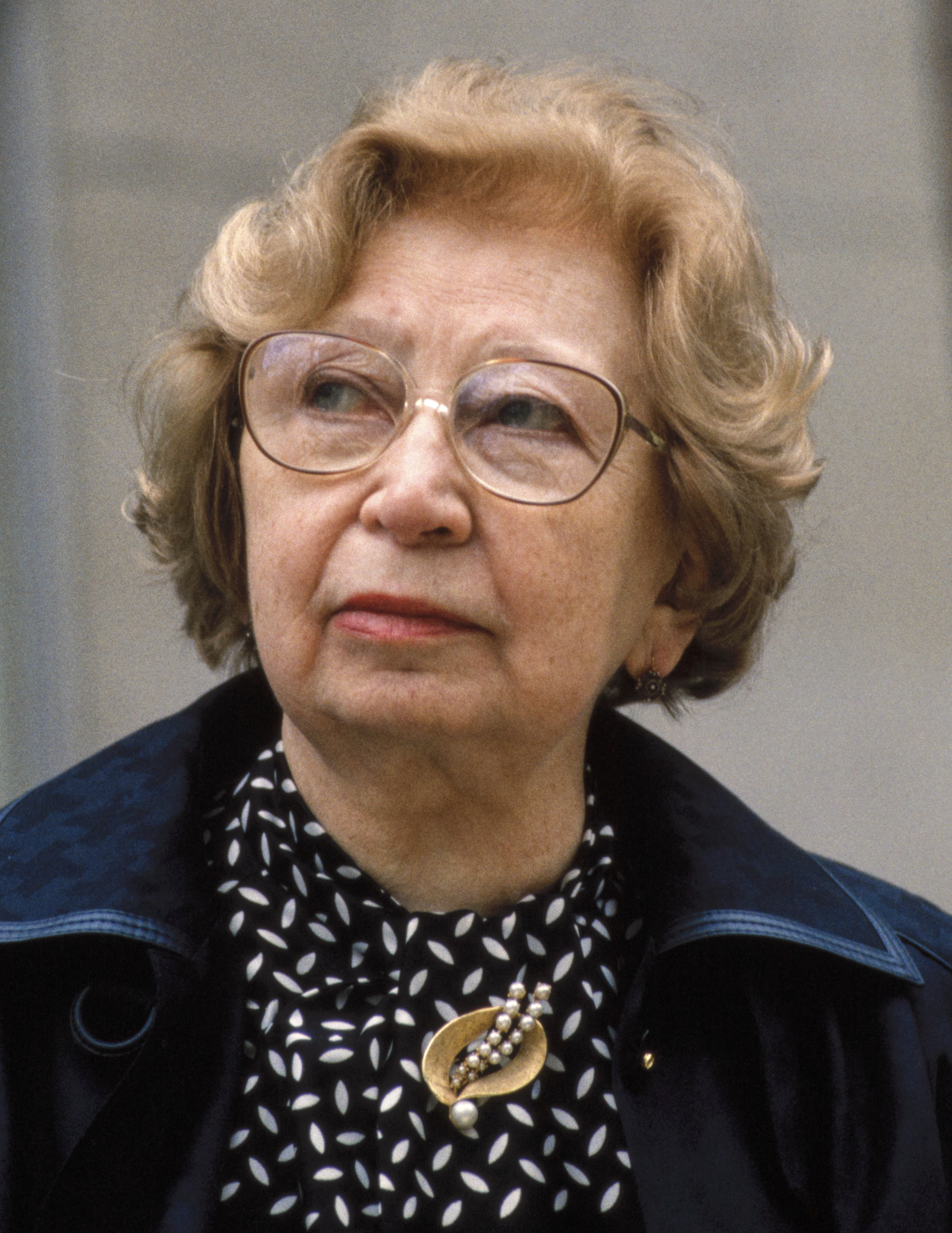
- Gies in 1987
- Born: Hermine Santrouschitz; 15 February 1909; Vienna, Austria-Hungary
- Died: 11 January 2010 (aged 100); Hoorn, Netherlands
- Known for: Hiding Dutch Jews, including Anne Frank and her family, from the Nazis; keeping Anne's diary
- Spouse: Jan Gies (m. 1941; died 1993)
- Children: 1
- Website: miepgies.com

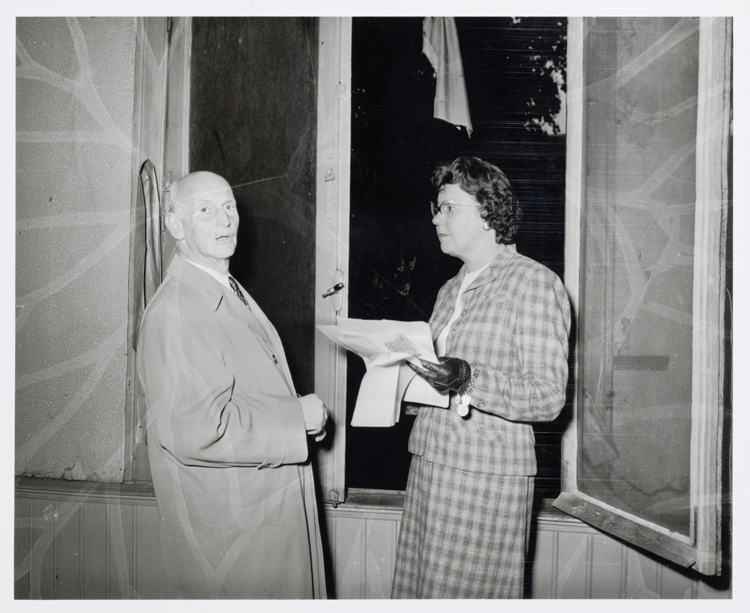
Otto Frank (father of Anne Frank) and Miep Gies, Achterhuis, Anne Frankhuis, Amsterdam, 9 May 1958

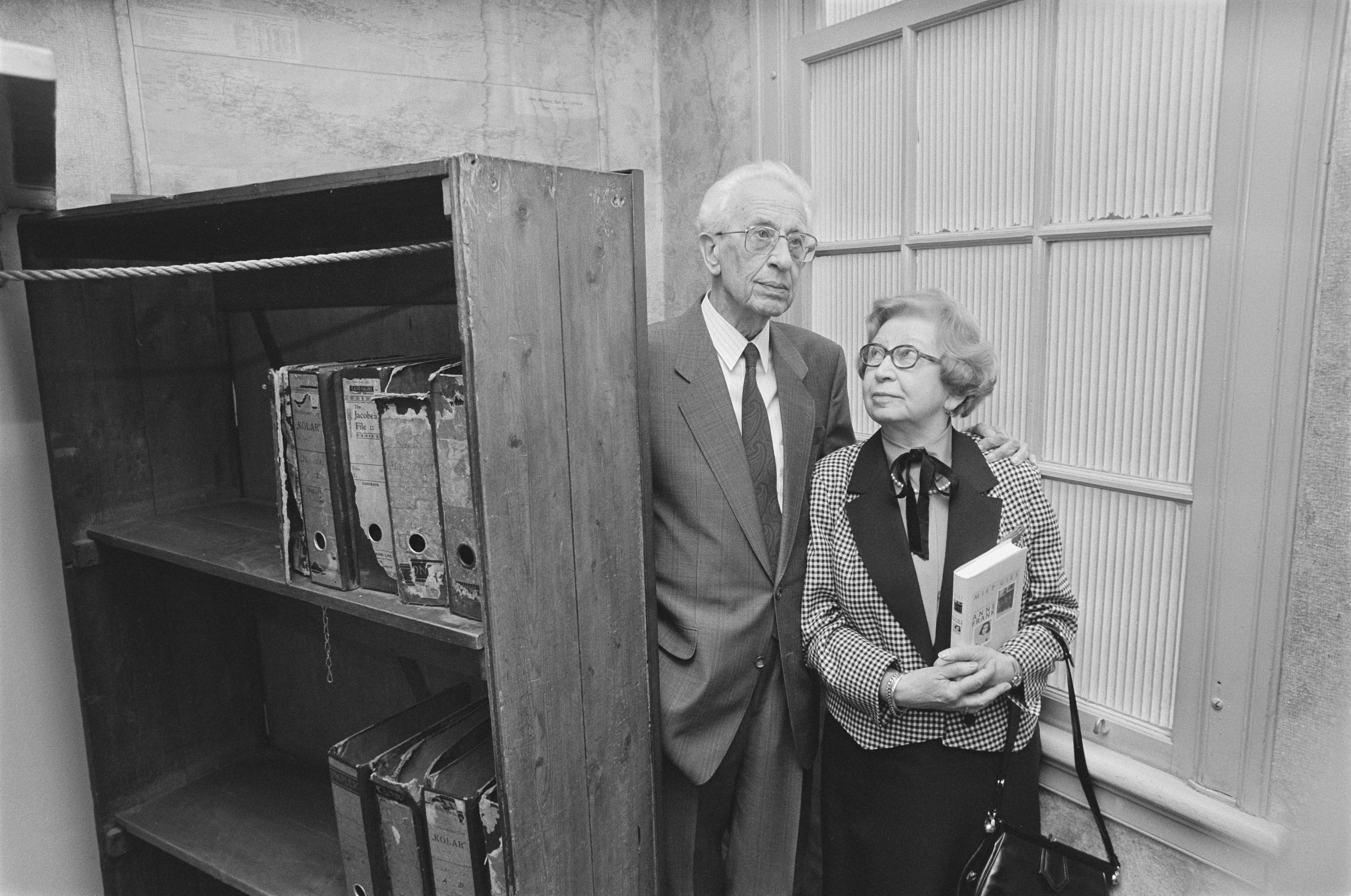
Miep and her husband Jan Gies at the book presentation of Miep Gies: Herinneringen aan Anne Frank (the Dutch version of the book Anne Frank remembered : the story of the woman who helped to hide the Frank family, 1987) in Anne Frankhuis near the moveable bookcase covering the stair to the secret hiding place "Achterhuis", Anne Frankhuis, Amsterdam, 5 May 1987

Hermine "Miep" Gies (Dutch: [mip ˈxis]; (Note: Gies in isolation: [ˈɣis].) née Santrouschitz; 15 February 1909 – 11 January 2010) was one of the Dutch citizens who hid Anne Frank, her family (Otto, Margot, Edith) and four other Dutch Jews (Fritz Pfeffer, Hermann van Pels, Auguste van Pels, Peter van Pels) from the Nazis in an annex above Otto Frank's business premises during World War II. She was Austrian by birth, but in 1920, at the age of 11, she was taken in as a foster child by a Dutch family in Leiden to whom she became very attached. Although she was only supposed to stay for six months, this stay was extended to one year because of frail health, after which Gies chose to remain with them, living the rest of her life in the Netherlands.

In 1933, Gies began working for Otto Frank, a Jewish businessman who had moved with his family from Germany to the Netherlands in the hope of sparing his family from Nazi persecution. She became a close, trusted friend of the Frank family and was a great support to them during the twenty-five months they spent in hiding. Together with her colleague Bep Voskuijl, she retrieved Anne Frank's diary after the family was arrested, and kept the papers safe until Otto Frank returned from Auschwitz in June 1945 and learned of his younger daughter's death soon afterwards. Gies had stored Anne Frank's papers in the hopes of returning them to the girl, but gave them to Otto Frank, who compiled them into a diary first published in June 1947.

In collaboration with Alison Leslie Gold, Gies wrote the book Anne Frank Remembered: The Story of the Woman Who Helped to Hide the Frank Family in 1987. She died in 2010 at age 100.

== Early life ==
Born in Vienna, Austria on 15 February 1909 to Karoline Maria Santrouschitz, she was sent to Leiden from Vienna in December 1920 to escape the food shortages prevailing in Austria after World War I. The Nieuwenburgs, a working-class family who already had five children of their own, took her as their foster daughter, and called her by the diminutive "Miep" by which she became known. In 1922, she moved with her foster family to Gaaspstraat 25 in Amsterdam. Gies was an honors student, and described herself as "reserved and very independent"; after graduating high school, she worked as an accountant and then in 1933 as a secretary with the Dutch branch of the German spice firm Opekta.

Otto Frank had just relocated from Germany and had been appointed managing director of Opekta's recently expanded Dutch operations. Gies, Frank's employee, became a close friend of the family, as did her fiancé, Jan Gies. After she refused to join a Nazi women's association, her passport was invalidated and she was ordered to be deported back to Austria within 90 days (by then annexed by Germany, which classified her as a German citizen). The couple faced some difficulties, but they were married on 16 July 1941 so that she could obtain Dutch citizenship and thus evade deportation. Gies's fluency in Dutch and German helped the Frank family assimilate into Dutch society, and she and her husband became regular guests at the Franks' home.

== Hiding the families ==
With her husband Jan and other Opekta employees (Victor Kugler, Johannes Kleiman and Bep Voskuijl), Miep Gies helped hide Otto and Edith Frank; their daughters, Margot and Anne,Hermann, Auguste and Peter van Pels; and Fritz Pfeffer in several upstairs rooms in the company's office building on Amsterdam's Prinsengracht from 6 July 1942 to 4 August 1944. In an interview, Gies said she was glad to help the families hide because she was extremely concerned after seeing what was happening to the Jews in Amsterdam. Every day, she saw trucks loaded with Jews heading to the railway station, en route to Nazi concentration camps. She did not tell anyone, including her foster parents, about the people in hiding whom she was assisting.

When purchasing food for the people in hiding, Gies avoided suspicion in many ways: for example, by visiting several different suppliers in a day. She never carried more than what one shopping bag could hold or what she could hide under her coat. To prevent the Opekta workers from becoming suspicious, Gies tried not to enter the hiding place during office hours. Her husband also helped by providing ration cards that he had obtained illegally. By visiting various grocery shops and markets on a regular basis, Gies developed a good sense of the supply situation.

At their apartment, close to the Merwedeplein where the Franks had lived before going into hiding, Gies and her husband Jan (who belonged to the Dutch resistance) also hid an anti-Nazi university student.

=== The capture ===
On the morning of 4 August 1944, sitting at her desk, Gies, along with Voskuijl and Kleiman, was confronted by a man with a gun commanding "Stay put! Don't move! Not a sound!" While there has been conjecture regarding how the Nazis came to find the Franks, an investigative team, including an ex-FBI agent, historians and other experts, determined in 2022 that a Jewish figure in Amsterdam, Arnold van den Bergh, probably provided the information to the Nazis to save his own family. The team worked for six years on the investigation using modern investigative techniques to discover the person who betrayed the Frank family and those hiding with them. Another theory about the capture of the group, including Kugler and Kleiman, claims they were arrested by Sicherheitsdienst Officer Karl Silberbauer, whose team was usually tasked with investigating financial crimes and not with searching for hidden Jews. This element, together with the fact that the officers inspected all the crates, bags and jars before finding the revolving bookcase could indicate that they may have not aware about the hiders. Gies and Bep Voskuijl were not arrested with the group. Gies managed to excuse herself by saying she knew nothing of those in hiding, and Johannes Kleiman gave Voskuijl his wallet with the request to take it to his friend Derk Kollen who had a pharmacy around the corner on the Leliegracht, a pre-arranged signal to inform Kleiman's family that there was a problem, and she was able to leave the building unhindered because no police officers were guarding the outside at that moment. The next day, Gies went to the German police office to try to find the arrestees. She offered money to buy their freedom but did not succeed. Gies and the other helpers could have been executed if they had been caught hiding Jews; however, she was not arrested because the police officer who came to interrogate her was from Vienna, her birth town. She recognised his accent and told him they had the same hometown. He was amazed, then started pacing and cursing at her, finally deciding to let her stay. Gies remained safe with her husband in Amsterdam throughout the rest of the war.

Before the hiding place was emptied by the authorities, Gies and the younger secretary, Voskuijl, retrieved parts of Anne Frank's diaries and saved them in their desk drawer. Gies was determined to give them back to Anne. After the war had ended and it was confirmed that Anne Frank had died in the Bergen-Belsen concentration camp, Gies gave the collection of papers and notebooks to the sole survivor from the Secret Annex, Otto Frank. After transcribing sections for his family, Otto Frank was persuaded of the value of his daughter’s account of their ordeal and arranged for the book's publication in 1947. Gies did not read the diaries before turning them over to Otto, and later remarked that if she had, she would have had to destroy them because the papers contained the names of all five of the helpers as well as of their black-market suppliers. She was persuaded by Otto Frank to read the diary in its second printing. In 1947, Miep and Jan Gies moved to Jekerstraat 65, by the Merwedeplein, along with Otto Frank.

Miep Gies had assured Frank's biographer, Melissa Müller, repeatedly that she did not think the main suspect, Willem van Maaren, was the culprit in the betrayal.

== Honors and awards ==
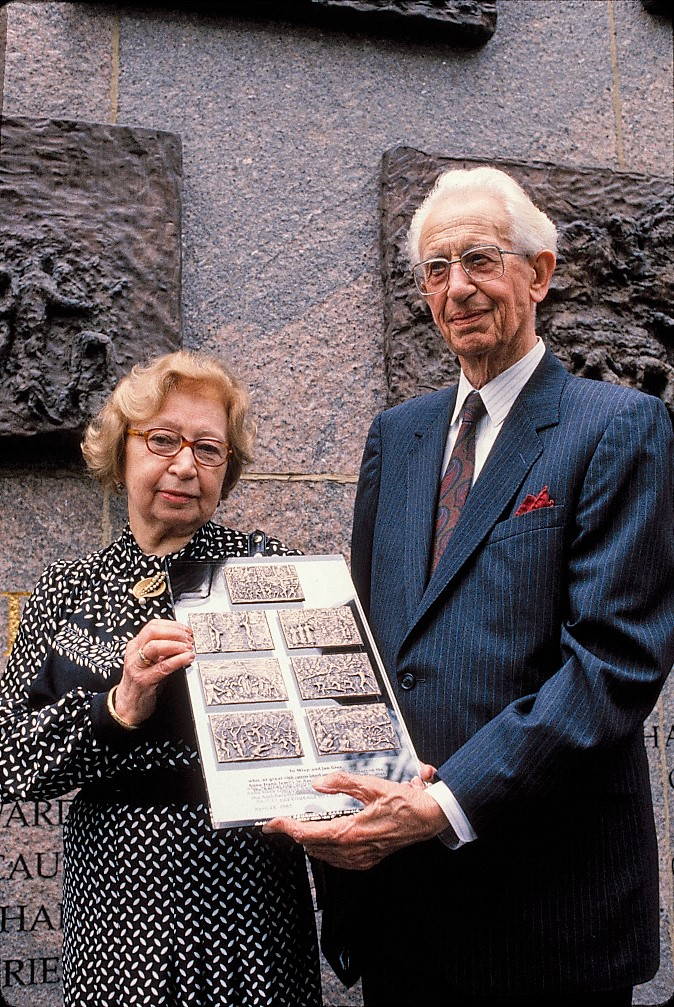
Miep and Jan Gies with plaque, 1987

Miep and Jan Gies were recognised as Righteous Among the Nations by Yad Vashem on 8 March 1972.

In 1994, Gies was awarded the Order of Merit of the Federal Republic of Germany as well as the Wallenberg Medal by the University of Michigan. In 1997, she was knighted in the Order of Orange-Nassau by Queen Beatrix of the Netherlands. The minor planet 99949 Miep Gies is named in her honor.

On 30 July 2009, the Austrian Ambassador to the Netherlands, Wolfgang Paul, presented the Grand Decoration of Honour for Services to the Republic of Austria to Gies at her home.

== Death and legacy ==
On 11 January 2010, Gies died, aged 100, in the city of Hoorn after suffering injuries from a fall.

Gies was interviewed about her memories of hiding the Frank family for the 1995 documentary film Anne Frank Remembered by Jon Blair. Miep Gies' story was adapted into a 2023 miniseries, A Small Light, with Bel Powley as Gies. Gies was also portrayed by actress and comedian Pat Carroll in the 2007 film Freedom Writers featuring Hilary Swank.
