= Fritz Pfeffer =

German physician

- Born: Friedrich Pfeffer; 30 April 1889; Giessen, Hesse, German Empire
- Died: 20 December 1944 (aged 55); Neuengamme concentration camp, Hamburg, Nazi Germany
- Education: Medical
- Occupation: Dentist
- Known for: The Diary of a Young Girl by Anne Frank
- Height: 6'2
- Spouse: Vera Bythiner (m. 1926; div. 1932)
- Partner: Charlotte Kaletta (1936–1944)
- Children: Werner Peter Pfeffer

Friedrich "Fritz" Pfeffer (30 April 1889 – 20 December 1944) was a German dentist and Jewish refugee who hid with Anne Frank and her family and the Van Pels family during the Nazi occupation of the Netherlands. He perished in the Neuengamme concentration camp in Northern Germany. Pfeffer was given the pseudonym Alfred Dussel in Frank's diary, and remains known as such in many editions and adaptations of the publication.

== Early life ==
Fritz Pfeffer was born in Gießen, Germany, one of the six children of Ignatz Pfeffer and Jeannette Hirsch-Pfeffer, who lived above their clothing and textiles shop at 6 Marktplatz in Giessen. After completing his education, Pfeffer trained as a dentist and jaw surgeon, obtained a license to practice in 1911 and opened a surgery the following year in Berlin. He served in the German army during the First World War.

In 1926, Pfeffer married Vera Bythiner (31 March 1904 – 30 September 1942), who was born in Posen in Imperial Germany (now Poznań, Poland). The marriage produced a son, Werner Peter Pfeffer (3 April 1927 – 14 February 1995), but the couple divorced in 1932. Pfeffer was granted custody of the boy and raised him alone until November 1938, when the rising tide of Nazi activity in Germany, as well as the Kristallnacht, persuaded him to send his son into the care of his brother, Ernst, in the United Kingdom. Werner Pfeffer emigrated to California in 1945 after his uncle's death and changed his name to Peter Pepper, later establishing a successful office supplies company under that name.

The tide of antisemitism in Germany, which increased with the rise to power of Adolf Hitler in 1933, forced most of Pfeffer's relatives to flee the country. His mother had died in 1925, and his father remarried and remained in Germany, only to be arrested and was murdered in Theresienstadt in October 1942. Of Pfeffer's brothers, Julius had died in 1928, Emil emigrated to South Africa in 1937, Ernst moved to England and died in 1944 and Hans left for New Jersey. His sister Minna remained with their father in Germany and died in Nazi custody, and sister Vera escaped to the Netherlands but was arrested in 1942 and murdered in Auschwitz.

In 1936, Fritz met a young woman, Charlotte Kaletta (1908–1986), born in Ilmenau, Thuringia, in central Germany, who shared his history of a broken marriage. She was estranged from her first husband, Ludwig Löwenstein and had a son, Gustav, both of whom were deported on 26 September 1942 from Berlin to Raasiku, Estonia and were murdered in the Holocaust. The couple moved in together but were prohibited from marrying under the 1935 Nazi Nuremberg Laws, which forbade marriages between Jews and non-Jews.

Kristallnacht cemented the Pfeffers' decision to leave Berlin; they fled to Amsterdam in December 1938. They were there for two years before the German invasion, and subsequent anti-Jewish laws prohibiting cohabitation of Jews and non-Jews forced them to officially separate and register under different addresses. After establishing a dental practice in Amsterdam's Rivierenbuurt, Pfeffer became acquainted with the Van Pels and Frank families. Miep Gies met Pfeffer at one of the Franks' house parties and became a patient in his dental practice.

== In hiding and afterwards ==
In the autumn of 1942, Pfeffer decided to go into hiding and asked Miep Gies about some suitable addresses. She consulted Otto Frank, whose family Gies had been hiding in secret rooms in the Franks' office building along with the Van Pels family. Frank agreed to accommodate Pfeffer, and he was taken into the hiding place on 16 November. Pfeffer's medical degree was valuable to the two families, as they could not contact a doctor while in hiding.

Margot Frank moved into a room with her parents to allow Pfeffer to share a small room with Anne, beginning what would become a torturous relationship for both. It has been suggested by at least one biographer that Anne's extreme discomfort at sharing her room with a middle-aged man while she was going through puberty may have been at the root of her problems with Pfeffer, but the pressures of being in hiding and the generational differences of their forty-year age gap undoubtedly exacerbated the differences in their natures. Pfeffer felt his age gave him seniority over Anne and wrote off her writing activities as unimportant compared to his own studies. His observance of orthodox Judaism clashed with her liberal views. Her energy and capriciousness grated on his nerves, while his pedantry and rigidity frustrated her. Anne's irritations and growing dislike of Pfeffer led to complaints and derisory descriptions of him in her diary, against which his son Werner and wife Charlotte defended him once the book was published. In Anne Frank Remembered, Werner said that his father didn't like being in hiding because he liked to play outdoor sports. He also noted that while Fritz could be strict at times, he was a caring person. Overall, the relationship of Anne and Fritz was the toughest of all.

Pfeffer left a farewell note to his wife and they stayed in touch through Gies, who met her on a weekly basis to exchange their letters and take provisions from her. His letters never disclosed the location of his hiding place and Gies never revealed it, but on 4 August 1944, Pfeffer and the seven other occupants of the hiding place were arrested for deportation to Nazi concentration camps.

With the rest of the group and two of their protectors, Johannes Kleiman and Victor Kugler, Pfeffer was taken to the Nazi headquarters at the Euterpestraat in Amsterdam-South, then to a prison for three days before being transported to the Westerbork transit camp on 8 August. Pfeffer was taken to the Punishment Barracks with the others, where he undertook hard labour, until he was selected for deportation to Auschwitz on 3 September. He was separated from the others on arrival on 6 September and sent to the men's barracks, where he was reunited with Otto Frank. On 29 October, he was transferred with 59 other medics to Sachsenhausen and from there to Neuengamme on an unknown date. In the infirmary there, Pfeffer died of enterocolitis at age 55 on 20 December 1944, according to the camp's records.

== Posthumous reputation ==
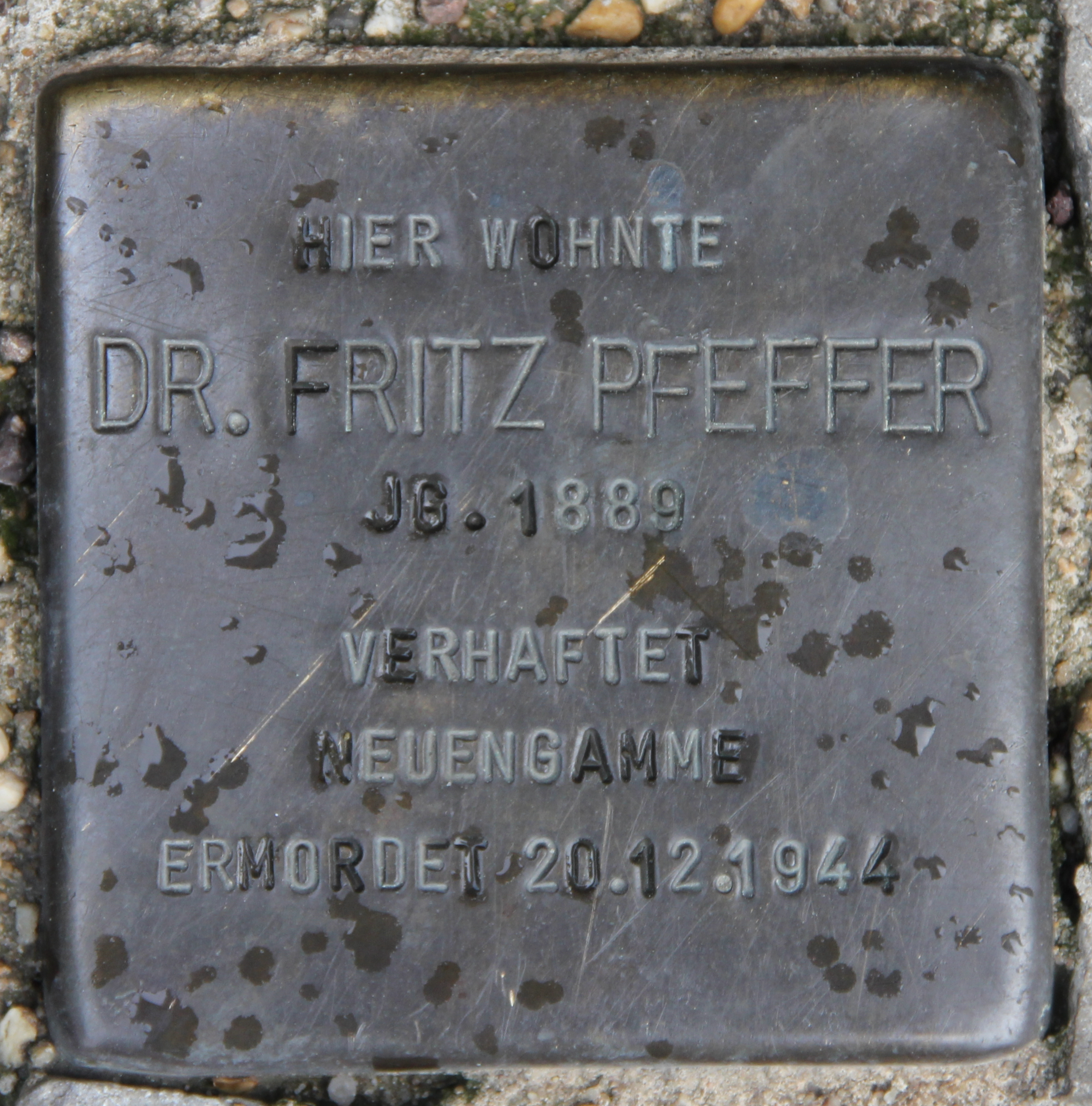
Stolperstein, Lietzenburger Straße 20b, Berlin-Schöneberg, Germany

According to research done by Melissa Müller for her book Anne Frank: The Biography, Charlotte Pfeffer married Fritz Pfeffer posthumously in 1950, with retrospective effect to 31 May 1937. She had become estranged from his son Werner, but both were united in their defense of Pfeffer after the publication of Anne Frank's diary in 1947, feeling that Frank's portrait of him—and of the pseudonym she had chosen for him, Mr. Dussel (German for "nitwit"), which Otto chose to use in the book—was injurious to his memory. Otto Frank tried to placate them by reminding them of his daughter's youth and of her unflattering portraits of some of the other people in hiding. The subsequent exaggerations of this portrait in the 1955 play and 1959 film (in which Pfeffer was played by comic actor Ed Wynn) led Charlotte Pfeffer to contact screenwriters Albert Hackett and his wife Frances Goodrich to complain that they were libeling her deceased husband, who was depicted as ignorant about Jewish traditions. The Hacketts replied that their script did not mirror reality and that to inform a non-Jewish audience of the significance of Judaic ceremonies, one character had to be ignorant of them. Pfeffer pointed out that her husband was a devout Jew and master of Hebrew, but the character of "Mr. Dussel" remained unchanged.

Embittered by the unrepresentative portrait, Charlotte Pfeffer severed her links with Otto Frank and Miep Gies as Anne Frank's fame grew in the decades after the war, and refused interview requests.

Werner Pfeffer remained in touch with Otto Frank and had the opportunity to meet Gies shortly before dying of cancer in 1995, to thank her for her attempt to save his father's life. The meeting was recorded for the documentary film Anne Frank Remembered.

A collection of letters written by Fritz Pfeffer to his wife and a box of photographs of him were rescued, with some of Charlotte Pfeffer's possessions, from an Amsterdam flea market after her death in 1985. In her memoir, Miep Gies writes that "The photos of Dr. Pfeffer reveal the handsome, cultured man I knew, rather than the buffoon that Anne so unkindly described in her diary."

Ed Wynn's portrayal of Pfeffer (as Dussel) in George Stevens' film The Diary of Anne Frank (1959) earned him a nomination for an Academy Award as Best Supporting Actor.

== See also ==
- Anne Frank
- List of people associated with Anne Frank

== Sources and further reading ==
- The Diary of a Young Girl: The Definitive Edition, Anne Frank, translated by Susan Massotty, edited by Otto H. Frank and Mirjam Pressler, Anchor Books, 1995.
- The Roommate of Anne Frank, Nanda van der Zee, Aspekt, 2003.
- The Footsteps of Anne Frank, Ernst Schnabel, Pan, 1959.
- Anne Frank Remembered, Miep Gies and Alison Leslie Gold, Simon and Schuster, 1988.
- Anne Frank: Reflections on her Life and Legacy, edited by Hyman A. Enzer and Sandra Solotaroff-Enzer, University of Illinois, 2000.
- Roses from the Earth, Carol Ann Lee, Penguin, 1999.
- Anne Frank - The Biography, Melissa Müller, Metropolitan Books, 1998.
- The Last Secret of the Secret Annex: The Untold Story of Anne Frank, Her Silent Protector, and a Family Betrayal, Joop van Wijk-Voskuijl and Jeroen De Bruyn, Simon & Schuster, 2023.
