= Victor Kugler =

Businessman who hid Anne Frank

- Kugler with the statue of Anne Frank in 1975
- Born: 5 June 1900; Hohenelbe, Kablikstrasse 119, Austria-Hungary (now, Vrchlabí, Czech Republic)
- Died: 14 December 1981 (aged 81); Toronto, Ontario, Canada
- Other name: Mr. Kraler
- Occupation: Worker at Opekta
- Spouse(s): Laura Buntenbach (died 1952) Lucie van Langen (m. 1955)

Victor Kugler (5 June 1900 – 14 December 1981) was one of the people who helped hide Anne Frank and her family and others during the Nazi occupation of the Netherlands. In Anne Frank's posthumously published diary, Het Achterhuis, known in English as The Diary of a Young Girl, he was referred to under the pseudonym Mr. Kraler.

== Biography ==
Kugler was born in Hohenelbe (now Vrchlabí) in the German-speaking part of Königgrätz region (Královéhradecký kraj/Hradec Králové Region), north-eastern Bohemia, Austria-Hungary, now in the Czech Republic, to Emile Kugler.

The Kugler family was Roman Catholic, and Kugler was baptized Catholic. He remained "quite religious" all his life, although later in life he identified as a Lutheran. Kugler married twice: his first wife was Laura Maria Buntenbach-Kugler (10 May 1895 – 6 December 1952), a Lutheran; his second wife was Lucie Sophia van Langen, a Catholic.

Kugler joined the Austro-Hungarian Navy during the First World War once his education was completed, but was discharged in 1918 after being wounded. He moved to Germany and worked as an electrician, then in 1920, Kugler moved to Utrecht, the Netherlands, to work for a company selling pectin. He joined the Amsterdam branch of Opekta as Otto Frank's deputy in 1933. He became a Dutch citizen in May 1938. In 1940, he accepted the directorship of Opekta, which was renamed Gies and Co, from Otto Frank which prevented the Nazi confiscation of the business. Kugler and his first wife, Laura Maria Buntenbach-Kugler, lived in Hilversum during the war, a distance of about 26 kilometres (16 mi) from Amsterdam.

From July 1942 to August 1944, Kugler aided his colleagues Miep Gies, Johannes Kleiman and Bep Voskuijl in the concealment of eight people, including Anne Frank, in a sealed-off annex in their office premises on Amsterdam's Prinsengracht.

In late 1943 Kugler was summoned to the local headquarters of the Nazi Party in his hometown of Hilversum, on the same night that the hiders on Prinsengracht were alarmed by an insistent ringing of the front doorbell. Kugler had apparently ignored the first summons, as the existence of a second summons demonstrates. It is not known why he was summoned or what was discussed.

He was arrested by the Gestapo on 4 August 1944, by the Austrian Nazi Karl Silberbauer, after they raided the Opekta building looking for people in hiding.

Kugler was interrogated at the Gestapo headquarters on the Euterpestraat, then transferred the same day to a prison for Jews and "political prisoners" awaiting deportation on the Amstelveenseweg. On 7 September, he was moved to the prison on Weteringschans, in a cell with people sentenced to death. This was followed, four days later on 11 September, by a transport to a concentration camp in Amersfoort, in the province of Utrecht, where he was selected for transport to Germany. On 17 September, the Amersfoort train station was destroyed in a bombing (Arnhem Air Raid) and on 26 September, he and around 1100 other men were taken to Zwolle for forced labour, digging anti-tank trenches. Kugler was moved again on 30 December 1944, to Wageningen for forced labour digging under the German S.A. (Brownshirts or Storm Troopers) until late March 1945, when some 600 prisoners were marched from Wageningen through Renkum, Heelsum, Oosterbeek, Arnhem, and Westervoort, to Zevenaar with the intention of going on to Germany the following day. There was a bombing raid during the march and Kugler took advantage of the confusion to escape. He was hidden by a farmer for a few days, borrowed a bicycle and made his way back to Hilversum, where he lived, and which he reached in April 1945. He hid there in his own house until the liberation of the Netherlands on 5 May 1945.

His wife, Laura Kugler, died on 6 December 1952 and three years later he married Loes (Lucy) van Langen. The couple moved to Canada, where Lucy's brother, sister and mother already lived. On 16 September 1958, Kugler appeared as a guest challenger on the American TV panel show To Tell The Truth.

In 1973, he received the Yad Vashem Medal of the Righteous among the Nations. In 1975 he received the Tel Aviv City Medalion and in 1977 the Canadian Anti-Defamation League awarded him the prestigious Nicholas and Hedy Munk Brotherhood award in recognition of his assistance in the hiding of the Frank and van Pels families, as well as Fritz Pfeffer.

He died at Etobicoke General Hospital in Toronto on 14 December 1981, and was buried at Sanctuary Park Cemetery in Etobicoke. In 2011 the Toronto Interfaith Group raised funds to place a marker for Kugler and his second wife.
