= Johannes Kleiman =

Concealer of Anne Frank

- Johannes Kleiman
- Born: 17 August 1896; Koog aan de Zaan, Netherlands
- Died: 28 January 1959 (aged 62); Amsterdam, Netherlands
- Other name: Mr. Koophuis
- Occupation: Board Worker of Opekta

Johannes Kleiman (17 August 1896 – 28 January 1959) was a Dutch resident who helped hide Anne Frank and her family in the Netherlands in World War II. In the published version of Frank's diary, Het Achterhuis, known in English as The Diary of a Young Girl, he is given the pseudonym Mr. Koophuis. In some later publications of the diary, the pseudonym was removed (just like the other protectors' pseudonyms), and Kleiman was referred to by his real name.

Kleiman was born in Koog aan de Zaan, the Netherlands, and met Otto Frank in 1923, when he was trying to establish a branch of the Michael Frank Bank in Amsterdam. Kleiman was registered as a proxy for the bank in May 1924 and given full powers in December of that year when the bank went into liquidation. He was hired by Frank as a bookkeeper for Opekta and Pectacon in 1938, but had become a close friend from about 1933, when the Frank family fled to the Netherlands to escape Nazi persecution in Germany.

Johannes Kleiman became a member of the board of Opekta and the company was established at his home address for the next five months until it moved to Prinsengracht 263 at the end of 1940. He officially joined as bookkeeper for both Opekta and Pectacon, with Victor Kugler and secretary Bep Voskuijl for Pectacon, and Otto Frank and his secretary Miep Gies for Opekta.

== Arrest ==
On 4 August 1944, Kleiman was arrested with Victor Kugler during the Gestapo raid that arrested the Frank family and four other concealed Jews in the premises on the Prinsengracht. After interrogation at Gestapo headquarters, he and Kugler were transferred to a prison on the Amstelveenseweg for Jews and political prisoners awaiting deportation. Kleiman was imprisoned in the Amersfoort labour camp before he was released by special dispensation of the Red Cross because of his ill health. In all, he was a prisoner of the Nazis for about six weeks.

After the publication of Anne Frank's diary, which detailed her two years in hiding, Kleiman regularly took journalists and visitors around the former hiding place, which had been vacated in the early 1950s. He became very involved in the establishment of the Anne Frank Stichting (Anne Frank Foundation) on 3 May 1957 but did not live to see the building open as a museum in May 1960.

== Death and legacy ==
He died, behind his desk, on 28 January 1959. Otto Frank was devastated about this loss. On 8 March 1972, Yad Vashem recognized Kleiman as one of the Righteous Among the Nations.
