= Leo S. Ullman =

Baseball collector and Holocaust survivor

Leo Ullman (born 1939) is a baseball memorabilia collector and Holocaust survivor. He collected over 15,000 items of baseball memorabilia, including the largest collection of Nolan Ryan memorabilia, which he donated to Stockton University in 2022.

== Biography ==
=== Early life ===
Ullman was born in the Netherlands in 1939. After the Nazi invasion of the Netherlands in 1940, his parents went into hiding to avoid the concentration camps. Ullman was taken in by the Schimmels, who hid him in their apartment attic although they risked death. He was later reunited with his parents with the help of the Dutch Resistance. His younger brother Hank was born nine months after the war ended. They immigrated to the United States in 1947. As a child, he could not at first speak English. His aunt started taking him to baseball games at Ebbets Field in 1948 to help him assimilate to American culture. He became a fan of the New York Mets and was given signed baseball cards by his brother.

He served in the US Marine Corps and Marine Corps Reserves, before attending Harvard and Columbia University, graduating with degrees in law and business. He later became a lawyer and investor. He has been chairman for the Anne Frank Center, the Foundation for the Jewish Historical Museum and the Netherlands National Holocaust Museum. He was also on the development committee of US National Holocaust Memorial Museum.

He wrote 796 Days: Hiding (2015), a book about his family and the Holocaust of Dutch Jewry.

In 2021, he funded the Holocaust Rescuers Exhibition at the Sara and Sam Schoffer Holocaust Resource Center at Stockton University.

=== Collection and later life ===
Ullman started his Nolan Ryan collection in 1995 while visiting Madison, Wisconsin for the birth of his grandson, and attended a card show next to the hospital. He purchased 12 Nolan Ryan baseball cards for $1 apiece. After this, he began collecting baseball memorabilia and became the largest collector of Nolan Ryan memorabilia in the world. He later said that his interest was in "the process of collecting" rather than Nolan Ryan.

As of 2022, his collection comprised 15,000 items, including signed baseball cards, baseballs, cowboy boots and other art. Among the items in the collection are Ryan's highschool yearbooks, a leather saddle bearing his likeness and the portrait used for his Baseball Hall Of Fame induction ceremony. Appraiser Leon Castner described it as "probably the largest private collection in existence and covers all types of memorabilia, from the mundane and common to the unusual and rare".

The collection was donated to Stockton University by Ullman in 2022, and was the centerpiece of a curriculum on collections. Parts of his collection have been displayed at the Noyes Museum Arts Garage, John F. Scarpa Academic Center, the Richard E. Bjork Library in Galloway, Kramer Hall in Hammonton and Stockton University at Manahawkin.

As of 2016, he lived in Port Washington, New York with his wife Kay.
