= Anne Frank =

German-born diarist and Holocaust victim (1929–1945)

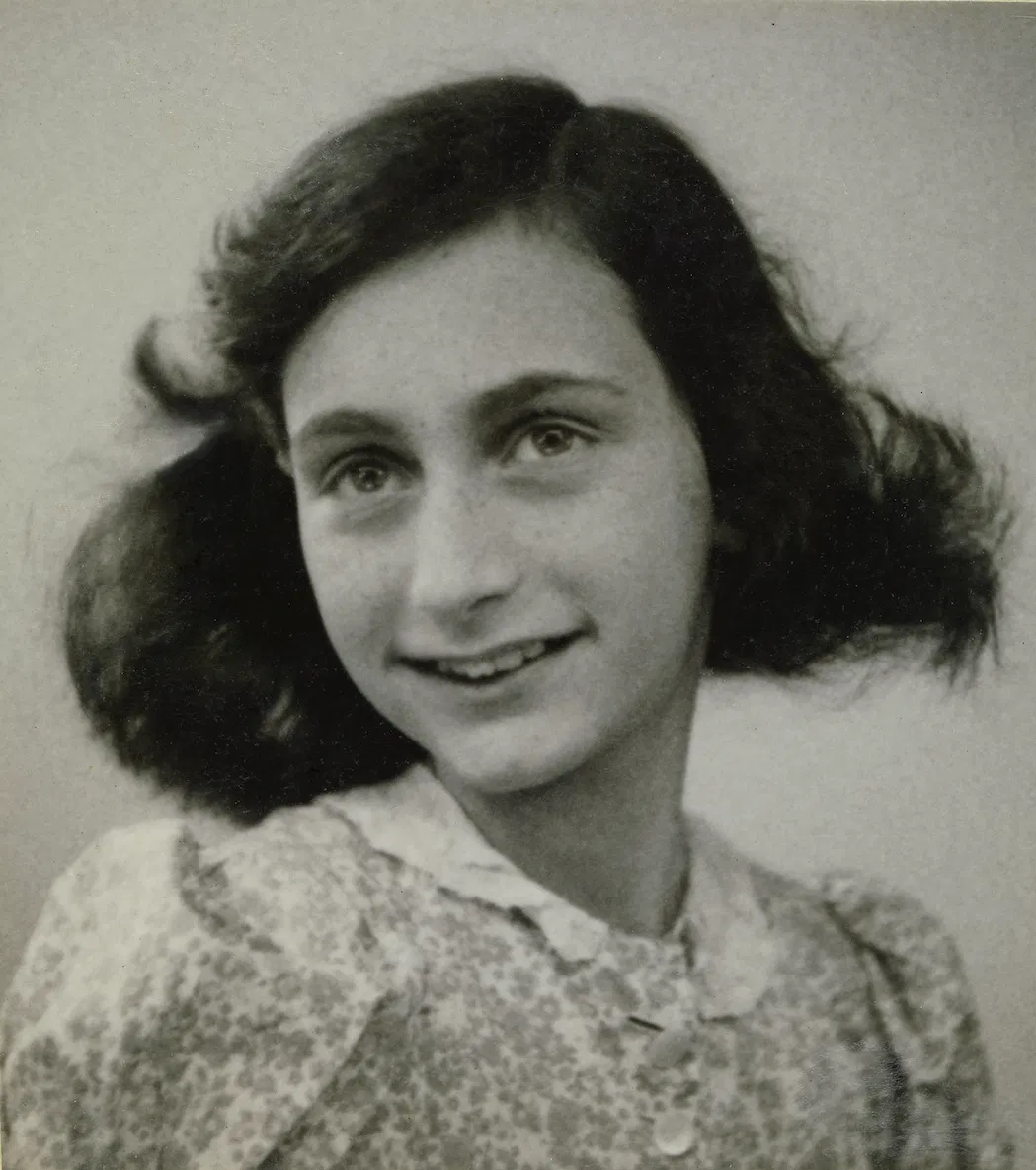
- Frank in May 1942, two months before she and her family went into hiding
- Born: Annelies Marie Frank; 12 June 1929; Frankfurt, Germany
- Died: c. February or March 1945 (aged 15); Bergen-Belsen, Germany
- Resting place: Bergen-Belsen concentration camp
- Citizenship: German (1929–1941); Statelessness (1941–1945)
- Education: 6th Montessori School Amsterdam (1934–1941); Jewish Lyceum (1941–1942)
- Occupation: Diarist
- Parents: Otto Frank (father); Edith Frank (mother)
- Relatives: Margot Frank (sister); Buddy Elias (cousin)
- Writing career
- Language: Dutch; German
- Genres: Biography; autobiography

Annelies Marie Frank (Note: German: [ˈanə(liːs maˈʁiː) ˈfʁaŋk]; Dutch: [ˌɑnəˈlis maːˈri ˈfrɑŋk, ˈɑnə ˈfrɑŋk]) (12 June 1929 – c. February or March 1945) was a German-born Jewish diarist and Holocaust victim. She gained worldwide notability posthumously for keeping a diary documenting her life in hiding during the German occupation of the Netherlands. In the diary, she regularly described her family's everyday life in their hiding place in a secret annex in Amsterdam from 1942 until their arrest in 1944.

Anne Frank was born in Frankfurt, Germany, in 1929. In 1934, when she was four-and-a-half, Anne and her family moved to Amsterdam after Adolf Hitler of the Nazi Party was appointed to govern Germany. By May 1940, her family were trapped in Amsterdam due to Germany's occupation. Frank lost her German citizenship in 1941 and became stateless. Despite spending most of her life in the Netherlands and being a de facto Dutch national, she never officially became a Dutch citizen. As persecution of the Jewish population increased in July 1942, the family went into hiding in a secret annex concealed behind a bookcase in the building where Frank's father, Otto Frank, worked. The family were arrested two years later by the Gestapo, on 4 August 1944.

Following their arrest, the Franks were transported to Westerbork transit camp and on to Auschwitz-Birkenau. On 1 November 1944, Anne Frank and her sister Margot were transferred from Auschwitz to the Bergen-Belsen concentration camp, where they died (presumably of typhus) a few months later. The Red Cross estimated that they died in March 1945, with Dutch authorities setting 31 March as the official date. Later research has alternatively suggested that they may have died in February or early March.

Otto Frank, the only Holocaust survivor in the family, returned to Amsterdam after World War II to find that Anne's diary had been saved by his secretaries, Miep Gies and Bep Voskuijl. Moved by his daughter's repeated wishes to be an author, Otto Frank published her diary in 1947. It was translated from its original Dutch version and first published in English in 1952 as The Diary of a Young Girl (originally Het Achterhuis in Dutch, lit. 'the back house'; English: The Secret Annex) and has since been translated into over 70 languages. With the publication of The Diary of a Young Girl, Anne became one of the most-discussed Jewish victims of the Holocaust. One of the world's best-known books, Anne's diary is the basis for several plays and films.

== Early life ==
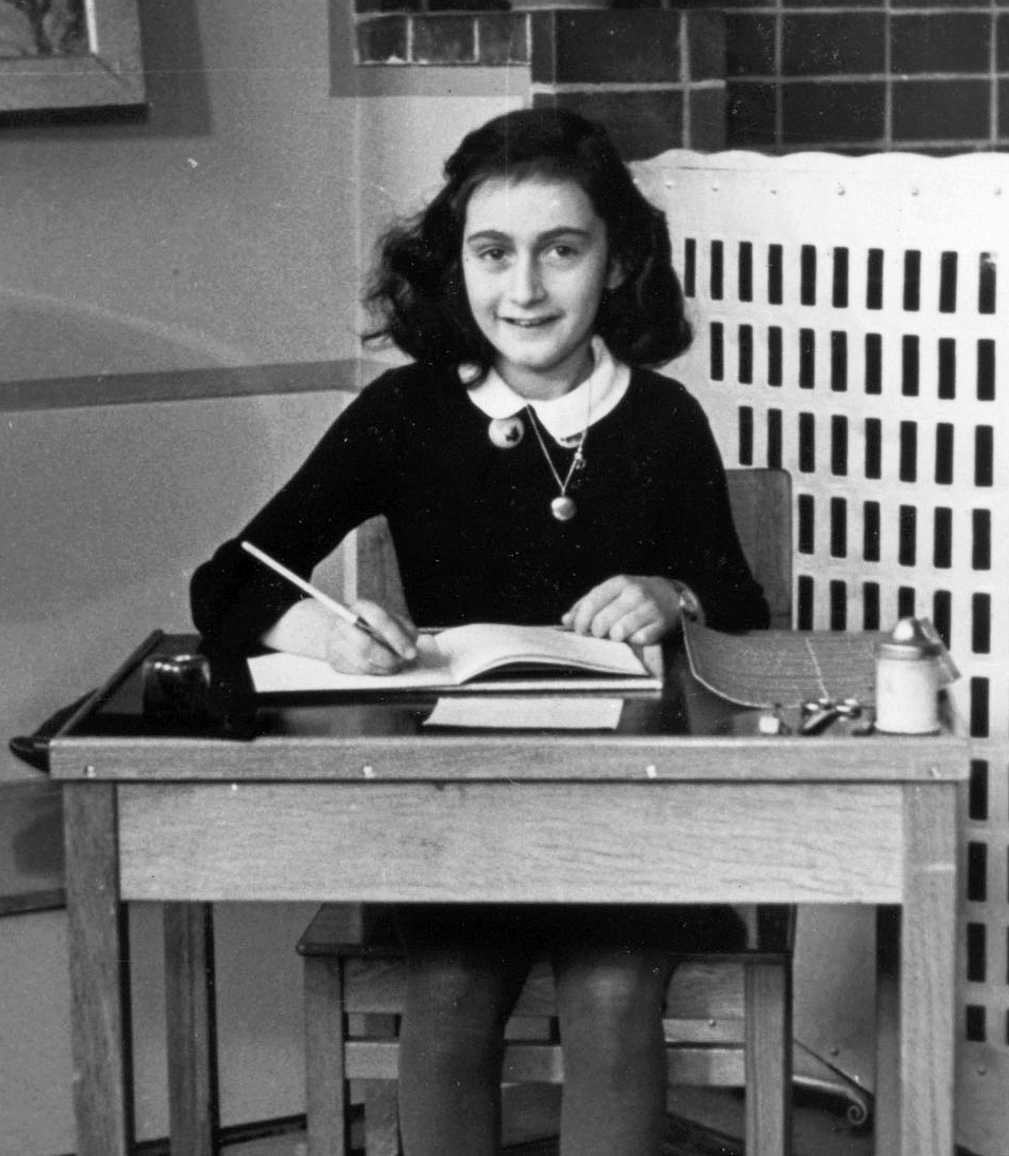
Frank at the 6th Montessori School (1940)

The only known film footage of Frank, showing her watching the wedding of one of her neighbours from the family apartment at Merwedeplein 37 in Amsterdam (1941)

=== In Germany ===
Frank was born Annelies or Anneliese Marie Frank on 12 June 1929 at the Maingau Red Cross Clinic in Frankfurt, Germany, to Edith (née Holländer) and Otto Heinrich Frank. She had an older sister, Margot. As the Franks were Reform Jews, they did not practise all the customs and traditions of Judaism. They lived in an assimilated community of Jewish and non-Jewish citizens of various religions. Edith and Otto were devoted parents with an interest in scholarly pursuits. They had an extensive library and both parents encouraged the children to read.

At the time of her birth, her family lived in a house at Marbachweg 307 in Frankfurt-Eckenheim (today Frankfurt-Dornbusch), (Note: Dornbusch was created in 1946 out of parts of Eckenheim and Ginnheim.) where they rented two floors. In 1931, they moved to a house at Ganghoferstraße 24 in a fashionable liberal area of Frankfurt-Ginnheim called the Dichterviertel ("Poets' Quarter") that is now also part of Dornbusch. Both houses still exist.

In 1933, after Adolf Hitler's Nazi Party won the federal election and Hitler was appointed chancellor of the Reich, Edith Frank and the children went to stay with her mother Rosa Hollander (née Stern) in Aachen. Otto Frank remained in Frankfurt, but after receiving an offer to start a company in Amsterdam, he moved there to organize the business and arrange accommodation for his family. He began working at the Opekta Works, a company that sold pectin, a fruit extract. Edith travelled back and forth between Aachen and Amsterdam and found an apartment on the Merwedeplein (Merwede Square) in the Rivierenbuurt neighbourhood of Amsterdam, where many Jewish-German refugees settled. In November 1933, Edith followed her husband and a month later Margot also moved to Amsterdam. Anne stayed with her grandmother until February, when the entire family reunited in Amsterdam.

=== In the Netherlands ===
The Franks were among 300,000 Jews who fled Germany between 1933 and 1939. After moving to Amsterdam, Anne and Margot were enrolled in school. Margot went to public school where, despite initial problems with the Dutch language, she became a star pupil. Anne joined the 6th Montessori School in 1934 and soon felt at home there, meeting children of her own age, like Hanneli Goslar, who would later become one of her best friends. Twenty-three years later, in 1957, the school was posthumously renamed after her as the Anne Frank School.

In 1938, Otto Frank started a second company, Pectacon, a wholesaler of herbs, pickling salts and mixed spices, used in the production of sausages. Hermann van Pels was employed by Pectacon as an advisor about spices. A Jewish butcher, he had fled Osnabrück with his family. In 1939, Edith Frank's mother Rosa came to live with the Franks and remained with them until her death in January 1942. In May 1940, Germany invaded the Netherlands, and the occupation government began to persecute Jews by the implementation of restrictive and discriminatory laws. Mandatory registration and segregation soon followed. Otto tried to arrange for the family to emigrate to the United States, the only destination that seemed to him to be viable, but his visa application was never processed because the US consulate in Rotterdam was destroyed by German bombing on 14 May 1940, resulting in the loss of all the paperwork there.

On 22 July 1941, Frank was filmed watching her neighbours' marriage ceremony from her balcony apartment above the road. It is the only known footage of Frank. After the summer holidays in 1941, Anne learned that she would no longer be allowed to go to the Montessori School, as Jewish children had to attend Jewish schools. From then on, Anne, like her sister Margot, went to the Jewish Lyceum (Joods Lyceum), an exclusive Jewish secondary school in Amsterdam that opened in September that same year.

=== Gallery ===
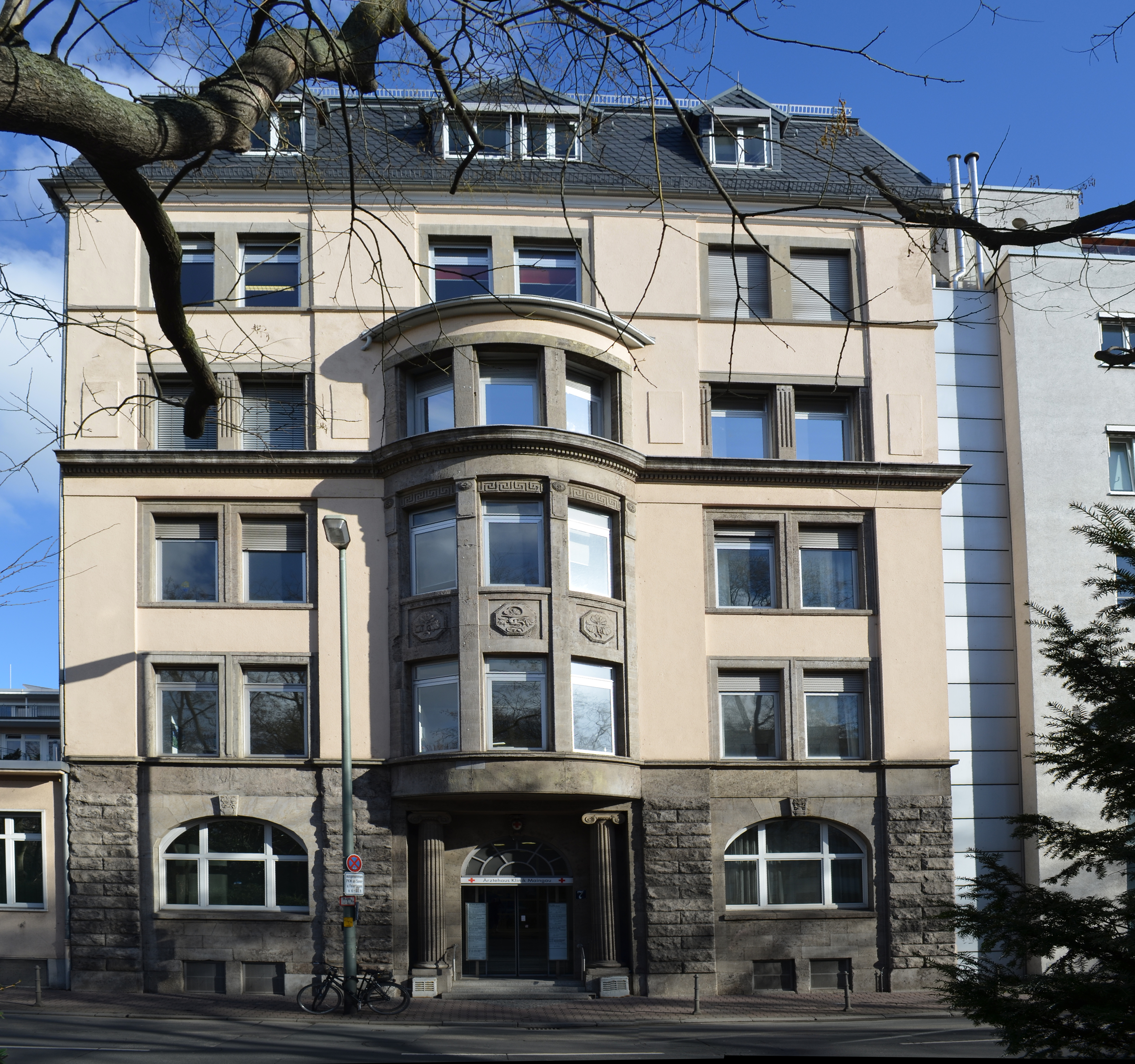
1929: Anne's birthplace, the Hospital Maingau of the Red Cross in Frankfurt-Nordend

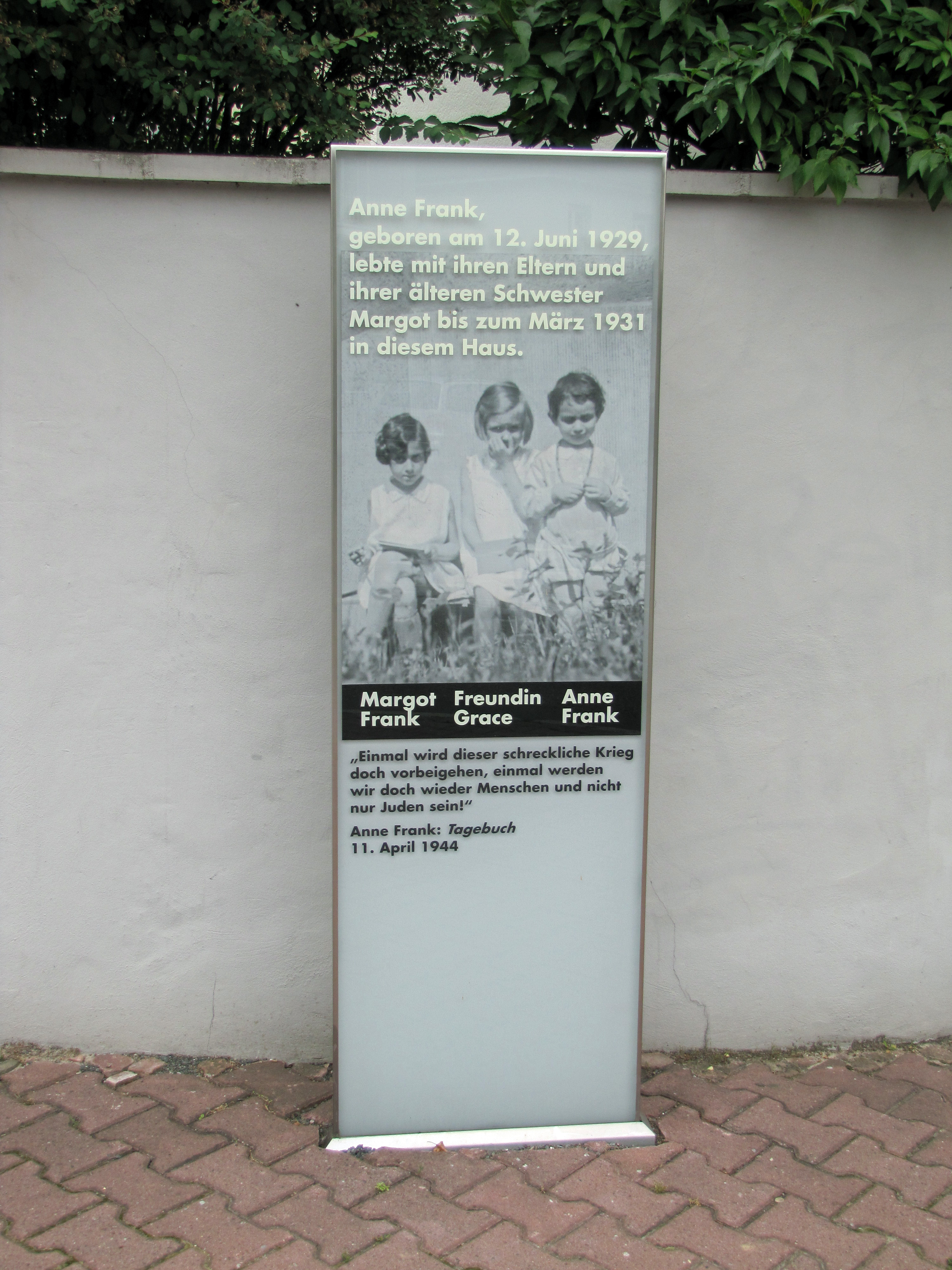
1929-1931: Stele in front of Anne's home at Marbachweg 307 in Frankfurt-Dornbusch

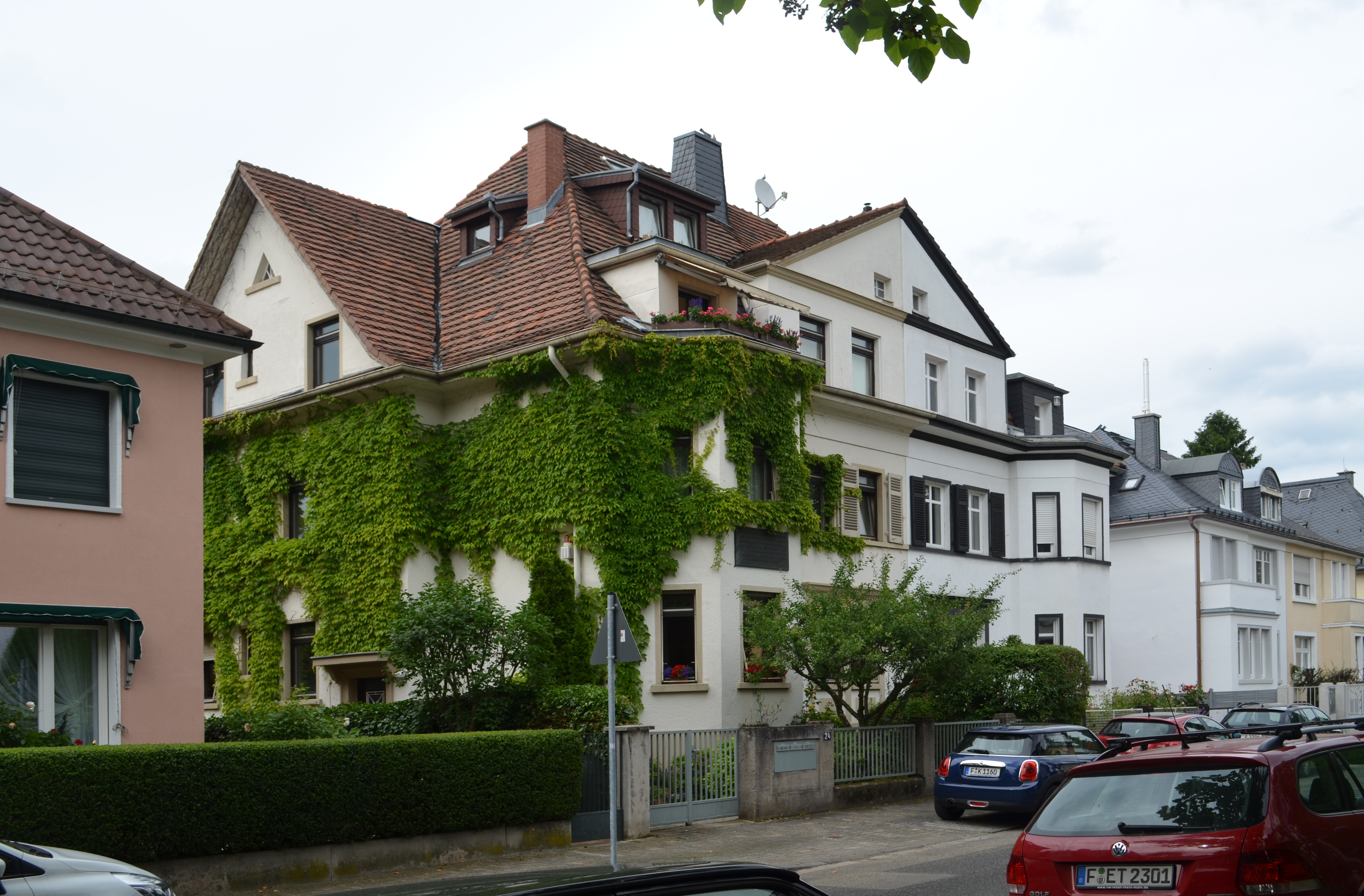
1931-1933: Ganghoferstraße 24 in the Poets' Quarter of Frankfurt-Dornbusch; the residence comprised the left half of the house

1931-1933: The commemorative plaque mounted on the building at Ganghoferstraße 24, between the ground floor and the first floor

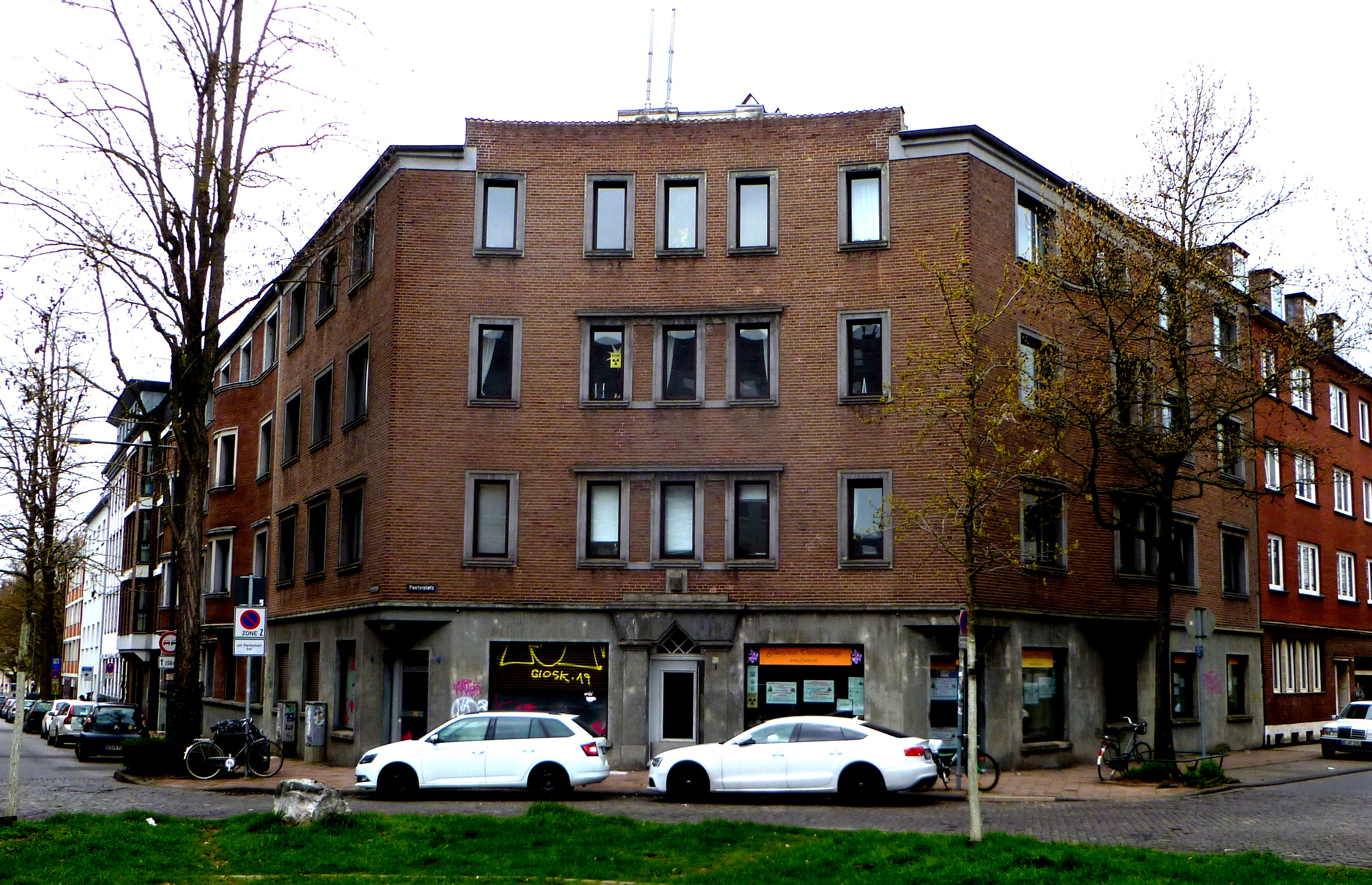
1933-1934: Pastorplatz 1 in Aachen, where Anne's maternal grandmother Rosa Holländer lived on the first floor until 1939

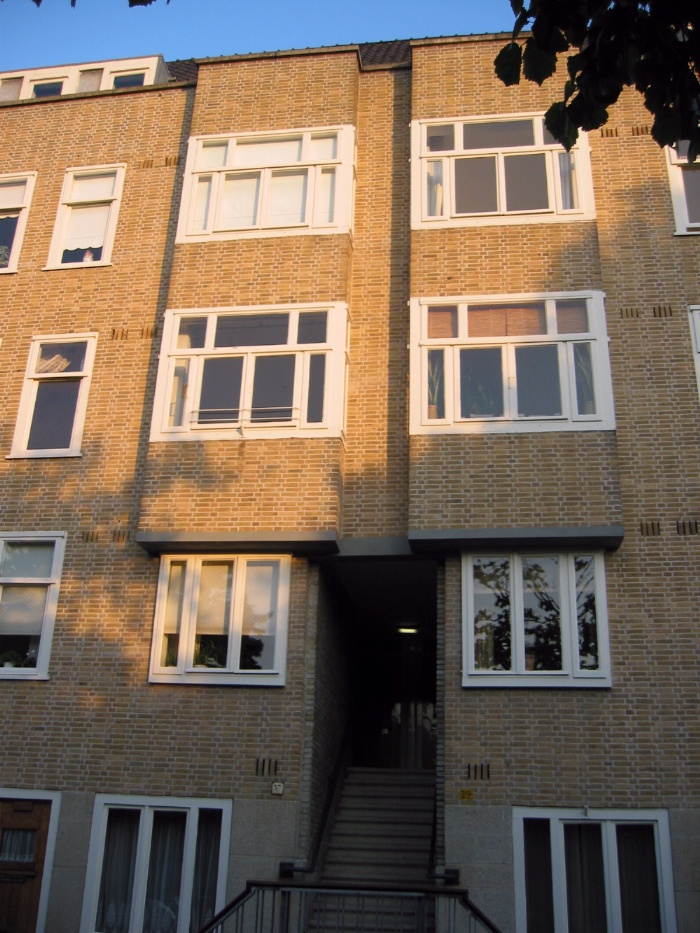
1934-1942: Merwedeplein 37 in Amsterdam

== Period chronicled in Anne's diary ==
=== Before going into hiding ===
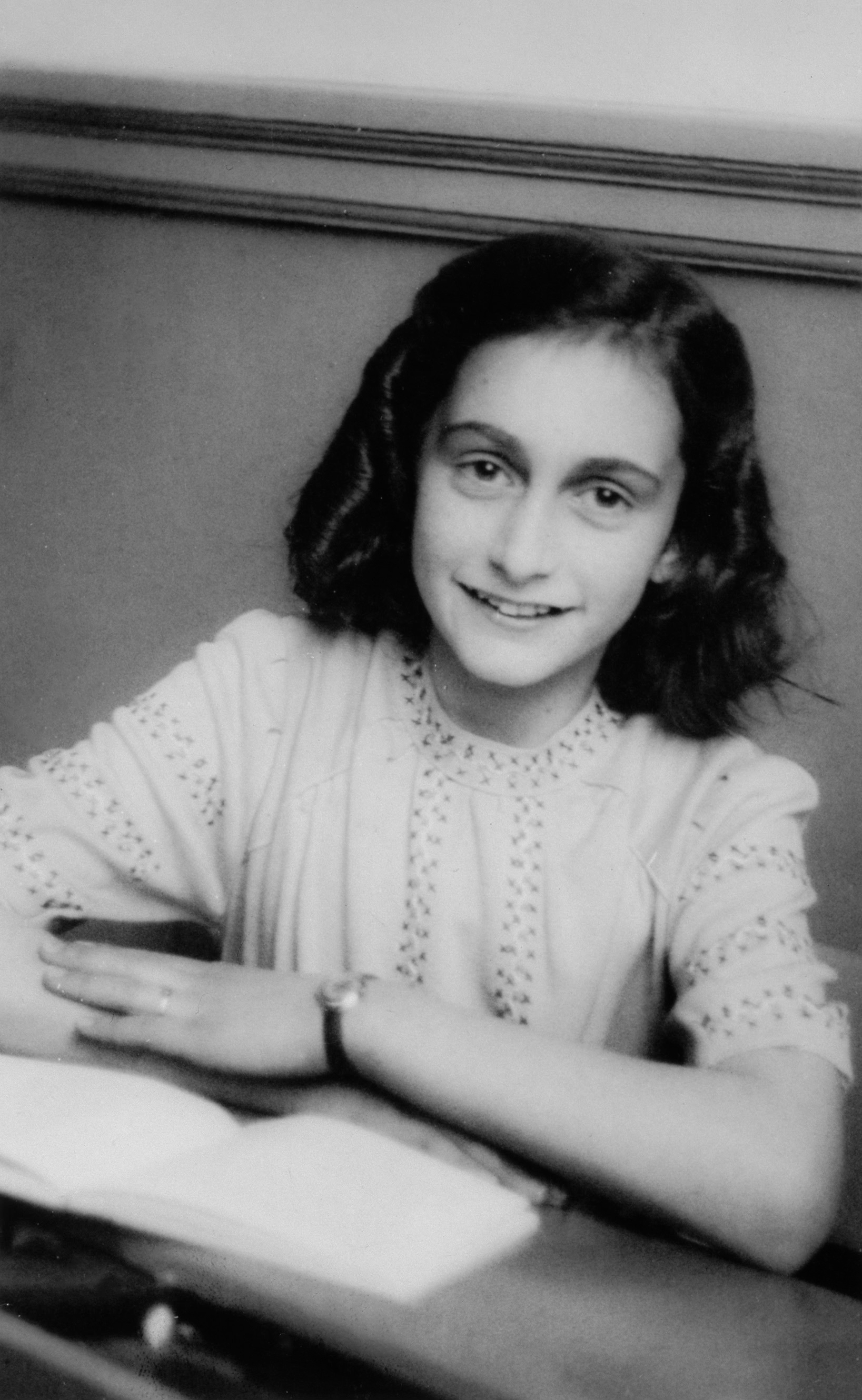
Frank in December 1941

For her thirteenth birthday on 12 June 1942, Anne received an autograph book, bound with red-and-white checkered cloth and with a small lock on the front. She decided she would use it as a diary, and named it "Kitty". She began writing in it almost immediately. In her entry dated 20 June 1942, she lists many of the restrictions placed upon the lives of the Dutch Jewish population.

In mid-1942, the systematic deportation of Jews from the Netherlands began. Otto and Edith Frank planned to go into hiding with the children on 16 July 1942, but when Anne's older sister Margot received a call-up notice from the Central Office for Jewish Emigration (Zentralstelle für jüdische Auswanderung) on 5 July, ordering her to report for relocation to a work camp, they were forced to initiate their plan ten days earlier than they had originally intended. Shortly before going into hiding, Anne gave her friend and next-door neighbour Toosje Kupers a book, a tea set and a tin of marbles. On 6 July, the Frank family left a note for the Kupers, asking them to take care of their cat Moortje. As the Associated Press reports, Kupers said Anne told her: "I'm worried about my marbles, because I'm scared they might fall into the wrong hands. Could you keep them for me for a little while?"

=== Life in the Secret Annex ===
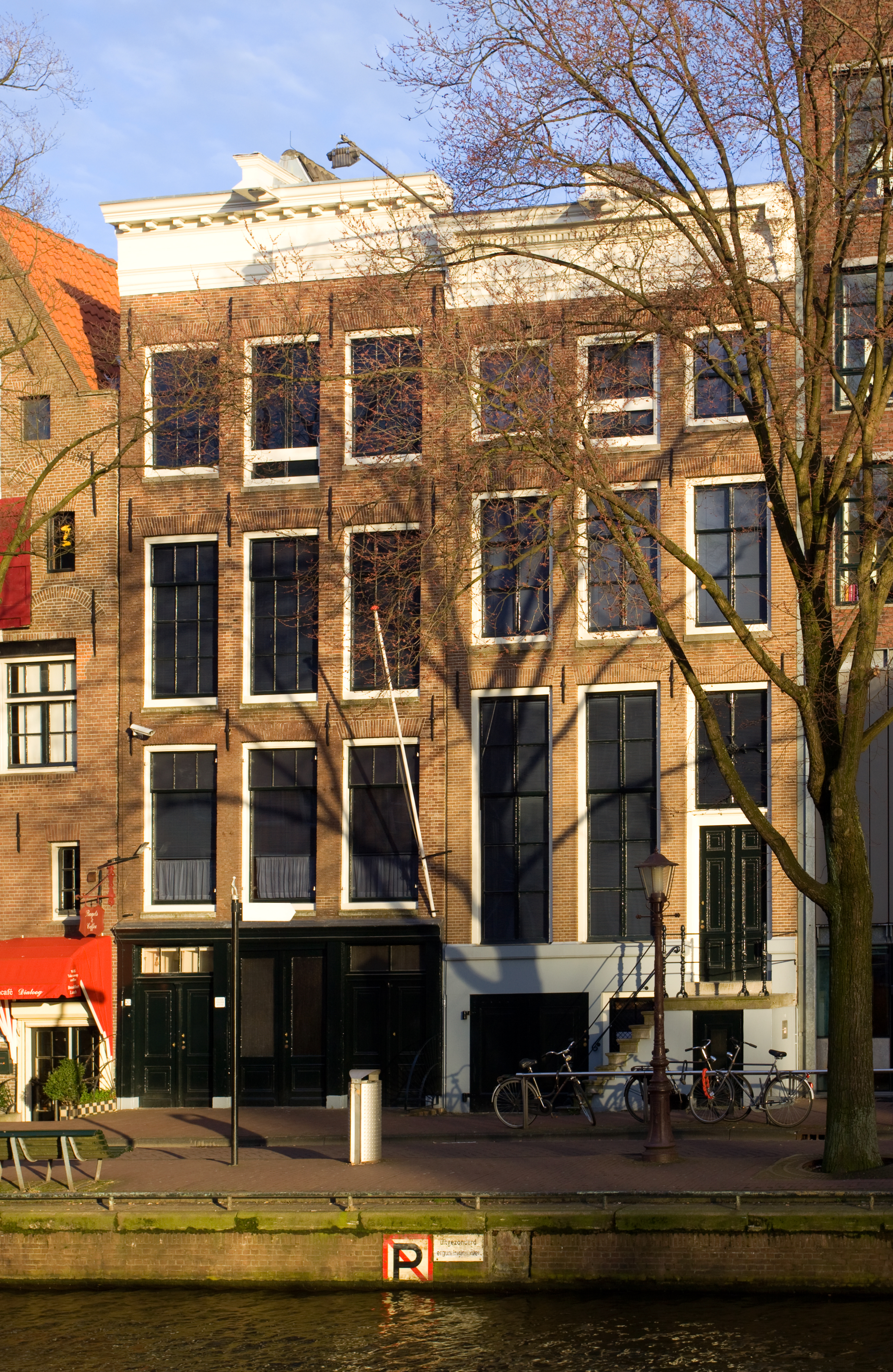
Canal-side façade of the former Opekta building (center-left) on Prinsengracht canal. The Secret Annex (Achterhuis) is at the rear in an enclosed courtyard.

On the morning of 6 July, the Frank family moved into their hiding place, a three-story space entered from a landing above the Opekta offices on the Prinsengracht, where some of Otto Frank's most trusted employees would be their helpers. The hiding place became known as the Achterhuis in Dutch (translated as Secret Annex in English editions of the diary). The Franks' apartment was left in a state of disarray to create the impression that they had left suddenly, and Otto left a note that hinted they were going to Switzerland. As Jews were not allowed to use public transport, Otto, Edith and Anne walked several kilometres from their home. Margot cycled to the Prinsengracht with Miep Gies. The door to the Secret Annex was later covered by a bookcase to ensure that it remained undiscovered.

Victor Kugler, Johannes Kleiman, Miep Gies, and Bep Voskuijl were the only employees who knew of the people in hiding. Along with Gies' husband Jan Gies and Voskuijl's father Johannes Hendrik Voskuijl, they were the "helpers" for the duration of confinement. As the only connection between the outside world and the occupants of the house, the helpers kept the occupants informed of war news and political developments. They catered to all the Franks' needs, ensured their safety and supplied them with food, a task that grew more difficult over time. Anne wrote of their dedication and efforts to boost morale within the household during the most dangerous times. All were aware that, if caught, they could face the death penalty for sheltering Jews.

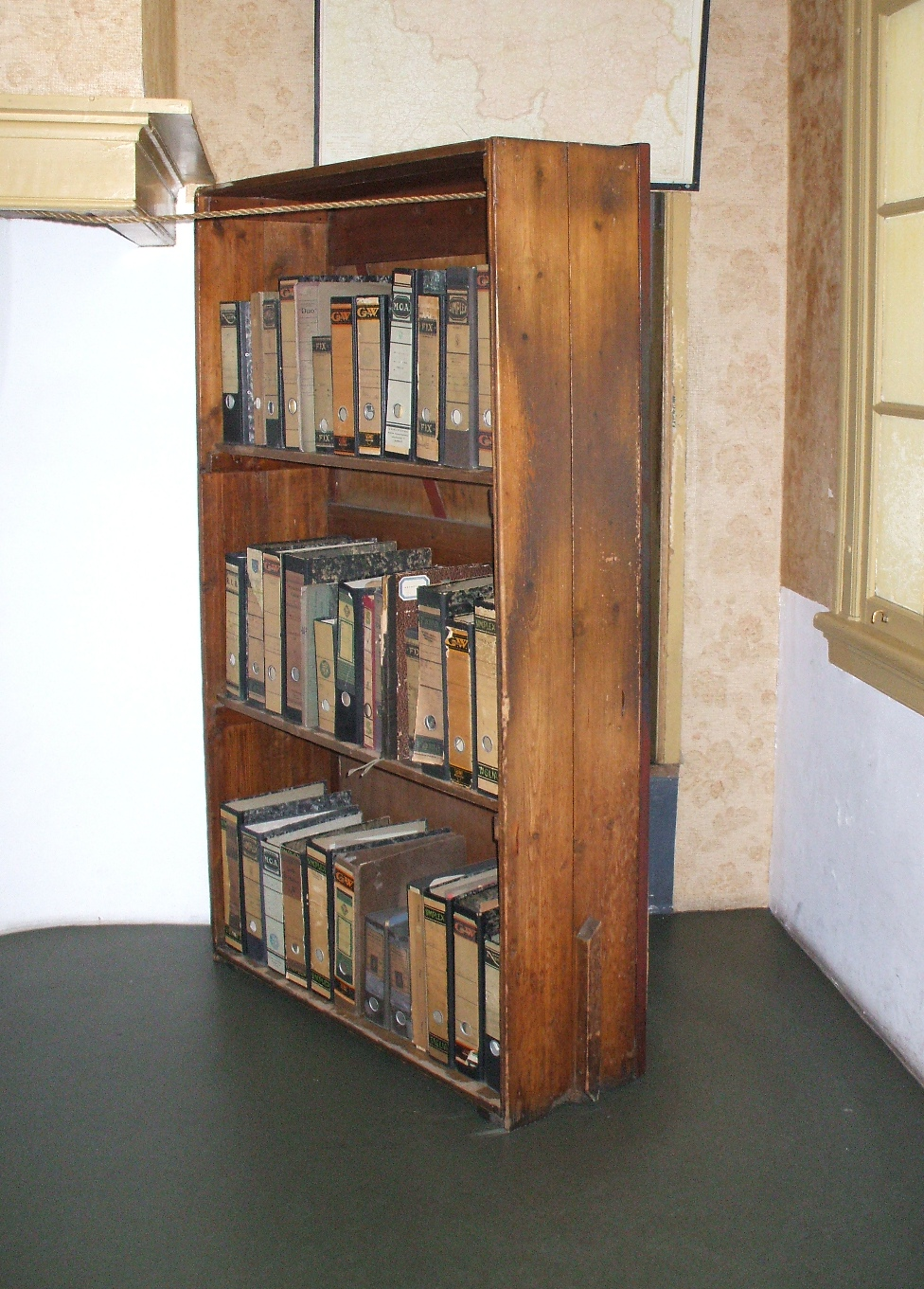
Reconstruction of the bookcase that covered the entrance to the Secret Annex, in the Anne Frank House in Amsterdam

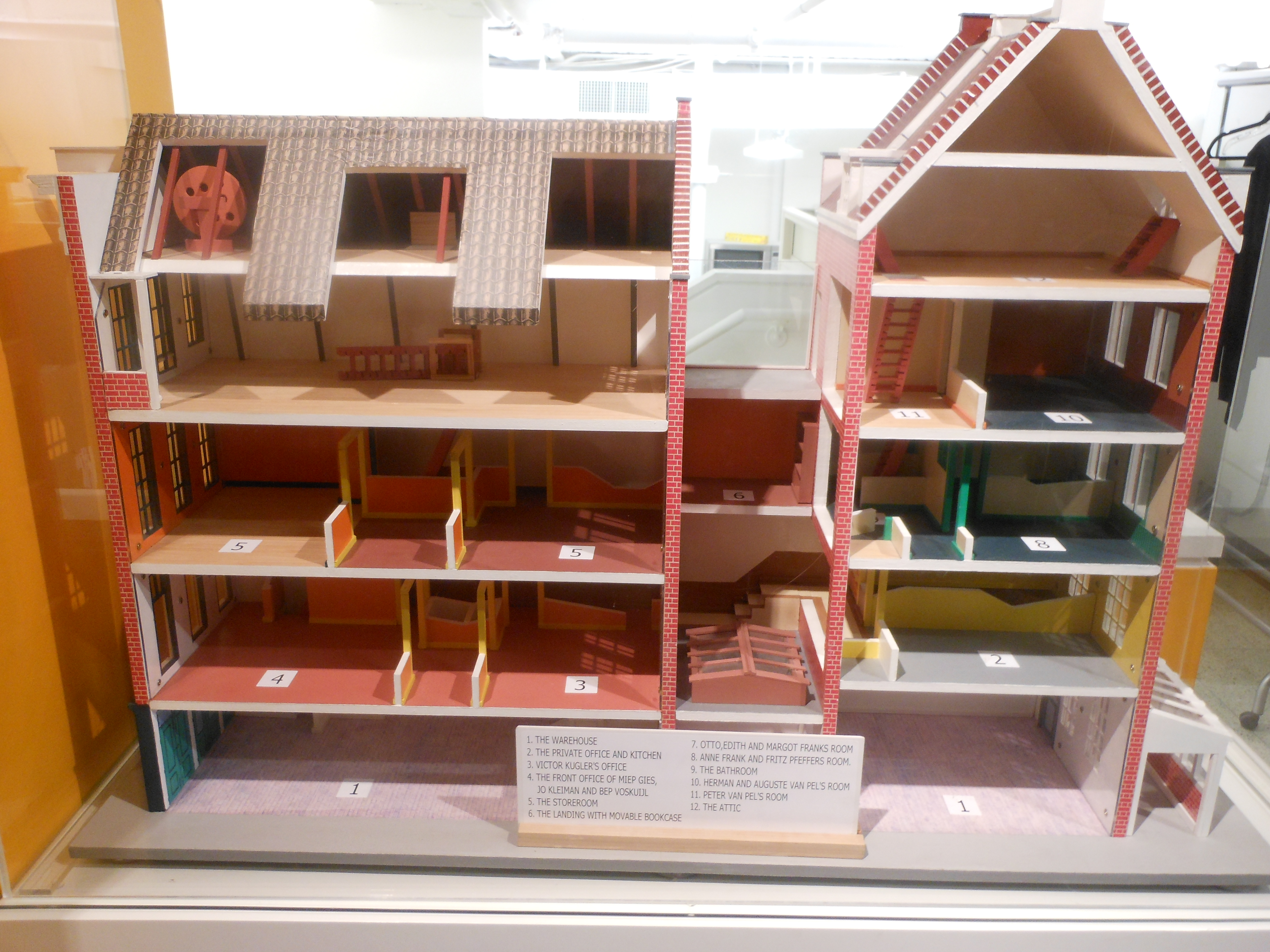
Model of the former Opekta front building (left) and rear building / Secret Annex (right) where Frank stayed

On 13 July 1942, the Franks were joined by the Van Pels family, made up of Hermann, Auguste and 16-year-old Peter; then in November by Fritz Pfeffer, a dentist and friend of the family. Anne wrote of her pleasure at having new people to talk to, but tensions quickly developed within the group forced to live in such confined conditions. After sharing her room with Pfeffer, she found him insufferable and resented his intrusion, and she clashed with Auguste van Pels, whom she regarded as foolish. She regarded Hermann van Pels and Pfeffer as selfish, particularly regarding the amount of food they consumed.

Sometime later, after first dismissing the shy and awkward Peter van Pels, she recognized a kinship with him and the two entered a romance. She received her first kiss from him, but her infatuation with him began to wane as she questioned whether her feelings for him were genuine or resulted from their shared confinement. Anne also formed a close bond with each of the helpers, and Otto Frank later recalled that she had anticipated their daily visits with impatient enthusiasm. He observed that Anne's closest friendship was with Bep Voskuijl, "the young typist ... the two of them often stood whispering in the corner".

=== Young diarist ===
In her writing, Anne examined her relationships with the members of her family and the strong differences in each of their personalities. She was closest emotionally to her father, who later said: "I got on better with Anne than with Margot, who was more attached to her mother. The reason for that may have been that Margot rarely showed her feelings and didn't need as much support because she didn't suffer from mood swings as much as Anne did."

The Frank sisters formed a closer relationship than before they went into hiding, although Anne sometimes expressed jealousy towards Margot, particularly when members of the household criticized Anne for lacking Margot's gentle and placid nature. As Anne began to mature, the sisters were able to confide in each other. In her entry of 12 January 1944, Frank wrote, "Margot's much nicer ... She's not nearly so catty these days and is becoming a real friend. She no longer thinks of me as a little baby who doesn't count."

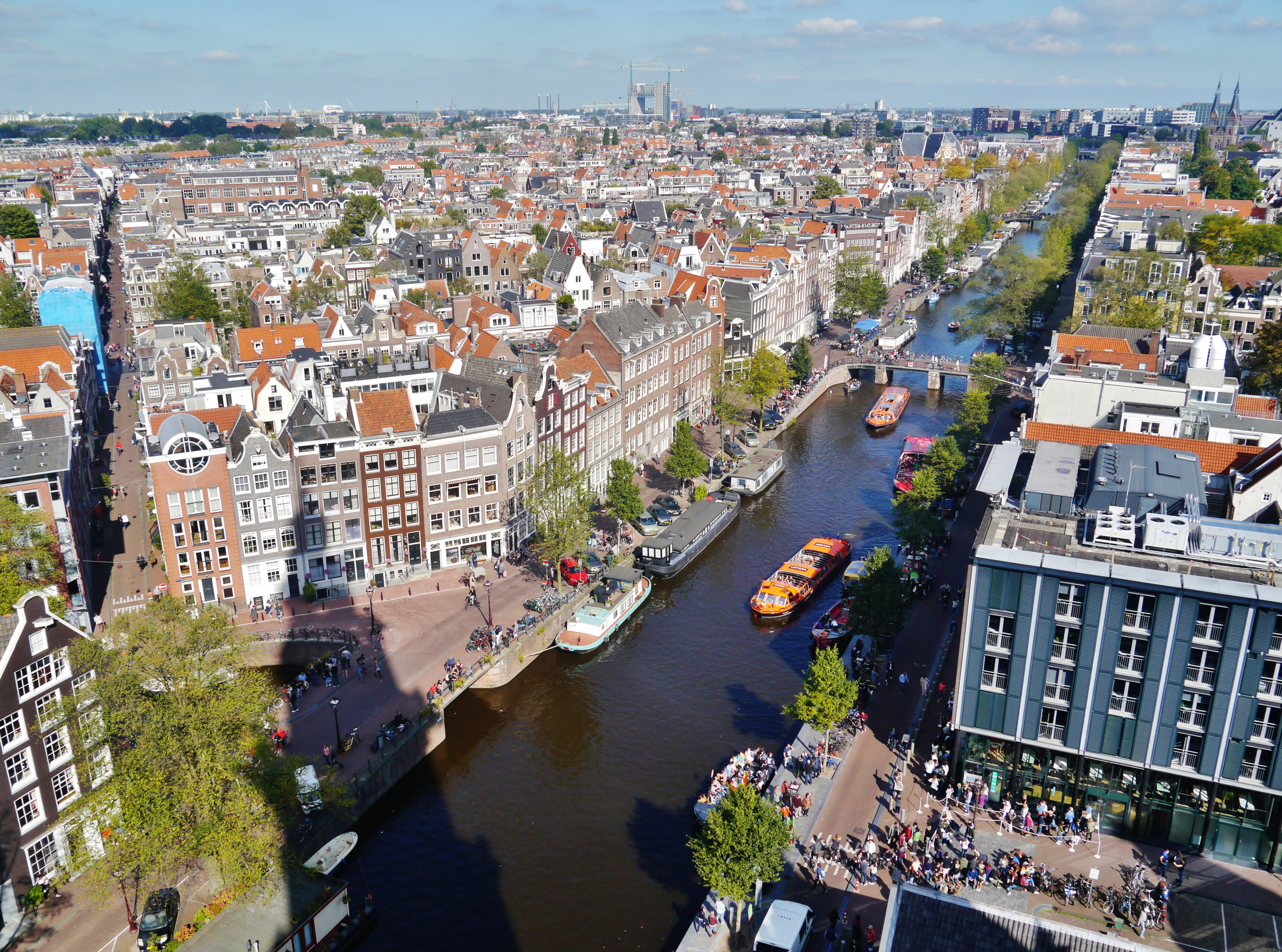
Amsterdam from the Westerkerk with partial view of the Secret Annex (just up from the dark grey building on the near-right corner, just right of the block-like square grey roof of the second building from the corner) with a light tan wall and a single small window

Anne frequently wrote of her difficult relationship with her mother, and her ambivalence towards her. On 7 November 1942, she described her "contempt" for her mother and her inability to "confront her with her carelessness, her sarcasm and her hard-heartedness" before concluding, "She's not a mother to me." Later, however, as she revised her diary, Anne felt ashamed of her harsh attitude, writing: "Anne, is it really you who mentioned hate, oh Anne, how could you?" She came to understand that their differences resulted from misunderstandings that were as much her fault as her mother's and saw that she had added unnecessarily to her mother's suffering. With this realization, Anne began to treat her mother with a degree of tolerance and respect.

The Frank sisters each hoped to return to school as soon as they were able and continued with their studies while in hiding. Margot took an 'Elementary Latin' course by correspondence in Bep Voskuijl's name and received high marks. Most of Anne's time was spent reading and studying, and she regularly wrote and edited (after March 1944) her diary entries. In addition to providing a narrative of events as they occurred, she wrote about her feelings, beliefs, dreams and ambitions, subjects she felt she could not discuss with anyone. As her confidence in her writing grew and she began to mature, she wrote of more abstract subjects such as her belief in God and how she defined human nature.

She aspired to become a journalist, writing in her diary on 5 April 1944:

I finally realized that I must do my schoolwork to keep from being ignorant, to get on in life, to become a journalist, because that's what I want! I know I can write ..., but it remains to be seen whether I really have talent ...

And if I don't have the talent to write books or newspaper articles, I can always write for myself. But I want to achieve more than that. I can't imagine living like Mother, Mrs. van Daan and all the women who go about their work and are then forgotten. I need to have something besides a husband and children to devote myself to! ...

I want to be useful or bring enjoyment to all people, even those I've never met. I want to go on living even after my death! And that's why I'm so grateful to God for having given me this gift, which I can use to develop myself and to express all that's inside me!

When I write I can shake off all my cares. My sorrow disappears, my spirits are revived! But, and that's a big question, will I ever be able to write something great, will I ever become a journalist or a writer?

Anne continued writing regularly until her last entry on 1 August 1944.

== Arrest ==
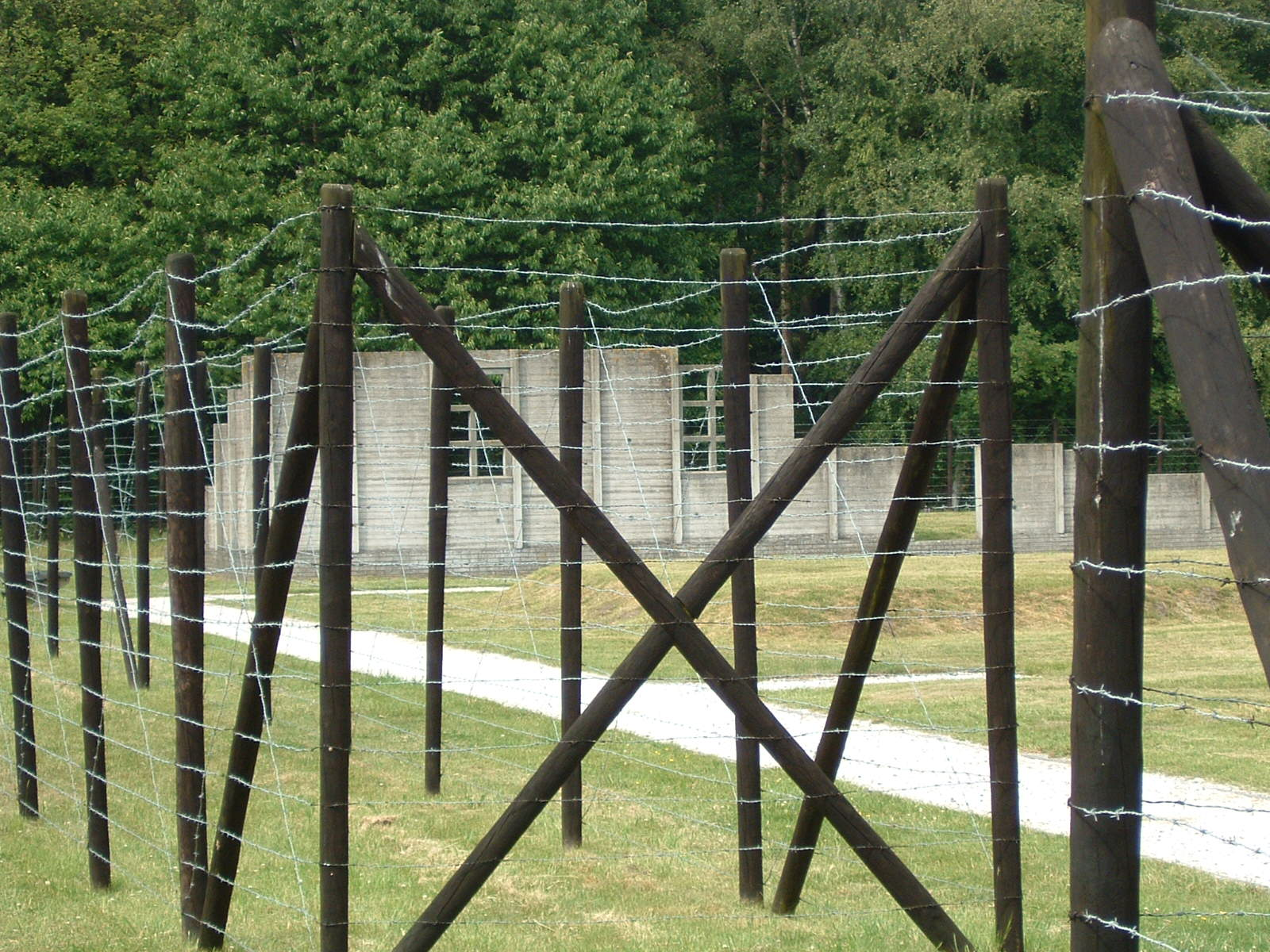
A partial reconstruction of the barracks in the Westerbork transit camp where Frank was housed from August to September 1944

On the morning of 4 August 1944, the Secret Annex was stormed by a group of German uniformed police (Grüne Polizei) led by SS-Oberscharführer Karl Silberbauer of the Sicherheitsdienst. The Franks, Van Pelses, and Pfeffer were taken to RSHA headquarters, where they were interrogated and held overnight. On 5 August, they were transferred to the Huis van Bewaring (House of Detention), an overcrowded prison on the Weteringschans. Two days later they were transported to the Westerbork transit camp, through which more than 100,000 Jews, mostly Dutch and German, had passed. Having been arrested in hiding, they were considered criminals and sent to the Punishment Barracks for hard labour.

Victor Kugler and Johannes Kleiman were arrested and jailed at the penal camp for enemies of the regime at Amersfoort, in the province of Utrecht. Kleiman was released after seven weeks, but Kugler was held in various Dutch concentration and prison camps until the war's end. Miep Gies was questioned and threatened by the Security Police but not detained. Bep Voskuijl managed to escape with a few documents that would have incriminated their black-market contacts. During the following days, the two secretaries returned to the Secret Annex and found Anne's papers strewn on the floor. They collected them, as well as several family photograph albums, and Gies resolved to return them to Anne after the war. On 7 August 1944, Gies attempted to facilitate release of the prisoners by confronting Silberbauer and offering him money to intervene, but he refused.

=== Source of discovery ===
There are varying theories as to how the Secret Annex inhabitants were discovered.

In 2015, Flemish journalist Jeroen De Bruyn and Joop van Wijk, Bep Voskuijl's youngest son, wrote a biography (Note: Bep Voskuijl, het zwijgen voorbij: een biografie van de jongste helper van het Achterhuis, ISBN 978-9035143098 (Bep Voskuijl, the Silence is Over: A Biography of the Youngest Helper of the Secret Annex)) in which they alleged that Bep's younger sister (their aunt) Nelly (1923–2001) could have betrayed them. Nelly was a Nazi collaborator from the age of 19 to 23, and had run away to Austria with a Nazi officer but returned to Amsterdam in 1943 after the relationship ended. Nelly had been critical of Bep and their father, Johannes Voskuijl, for helping the Jews. Johannes had constructed the bookcase covering the entrance to the hiding place and remained as an unofficial watchman of the hideout. In one of their quarrels, Nelly shouted to them, "Go to your Jews!" Karl Josef Silberbauer, the SS officer who made the arrest, was reported to have said that the informer had "the voice of a young woman."

In 2016, the Anne Frank House published new research pointing to an investigation over ration-card fraud rather than betrayal as a possible explanation for the raid that led to the Franks' arrest. The report also stated that other activities in the building may have led authorities there, including activities of Otto Frank's company; however, it did not rule out betrayal.

A 2018 book suggested that the source of the Secret Annex discovery was Ans van Dijk, a Dutch Jew who betrayed at least 145 fellow Jews to the Gestapo, as a potential candidate for the informant. Dutch resistance fighter Gerard Kremer, who worked as a caretaker at an office building requisitioned by the Sicherheitsdienst, apparently witnessed Van Dijk visiting the building in August 1944 and overheard her talking with her intelligence superiors about Prinsengracht, where the Franks were hiding. However, another book examining this possibility noted that many of Van Dijk's victims had lived in or near Prinsengracht.

In January 2022, a team of investigators, including former FBI agent Vince Pankoke, proposed Arnold van den Bergh, a member of Amsterdam's Jewish Council who died in 1950, as the suspected informant. The investigators postulated that Van den Bergh gave up the Franks to save his own family. The investigation is chronicled in Rosemary Sullivan's English-language book, The Betrayal of Anne Frank: A Cold Case Investigation. It was also claimed that Anne Frank's father may have known this but did not reveal it after the war. According to the BBC, these investigators "spent six years using modern investigative techniques to crack the 'cold case'." However, several World War II and Holocaust scholars have doubted the investigators' methods and conclusions, calling the evidence "far too thin", according to The New York Times.

The Dutch-language version of The Betrayal of Anne Frank received criticism from scholars Bart van der Boom, David Barnouw, and Johannes Houwink ten Cate shortly after its publication. The publisher, Ambo Anthos, apologized via internal email, saying that they should have been more critical of the book before publishing it and that they were delaying the decision to print another run of it until the researchers answered questions about the book. In response, Pieter van Twisk, one of the investigators referenced in the book, said that he was "perplexed by the email" and that they had never claimed to have uncovered the complete truth. When a group of World War II experts and historians published their analysis of the book's historical sources and conclusions in March 2022, they contested the central claim that the Amsterdam Jewish council even had a list of Jewish hiding places from which Van den Bergh could draw, concluding that the accusation of Van den Bergh was based on weak assumptions and a lack of historical knowledge. As a result, Ambo Anthos recalled the Dutch-language version of the book.

In August 2022, Dutch researcher Natasha Gerson published an 80-page report analyzing the annotations and sources in The Betrayal of Anne Frank, arguing that the theory in the book was not only flawed but also the product of source fraud. The report concluded that Otto Frank's recorded agenda, as well as a letter he received from helper Johannes Kleiman and several other statements, were proven to be distorted to suit the outcome in the book. Several negative claims about Van den Bergh had Anton Schepers, a Nazi collaborator who was twice diagnosed as insane and who had taken over Van den Bergh's notary practice, as their only source. Included among them was the claim of Nazi contacts and a commission of 200,000 guilders paid on the sale of Jacques Goudstikker's art business. Although The Betrayal of Anne Frank stated that Van den Bergh enjoyed the protection of two high-up Nazis, the report said that the cold-case team and the book's author had omitted statements that the named Nazis had not known him. Previously postponed plans to publish a German translation of Sullivan's book were cancelled soon afterward.

== Deportation and life in captivity ==
On 3 September 1944, (Note: Westra et al. 2004, p. 196, includes a reproduction of part of the transport list showing the names of each of the Frank family.) the Secret Annex group was deported on what would be the last transport from Westerbork to the Auschwitz concentration camp and arrived after a three-day journey. On the same train was Bloeme Evers-Emden, an Amsterdam native who had befriended Margot and Anne in the Jewish Lyceum in 1941. Bloeme saw Anne, Margot and their mother regularly in Auschwitz. She was interviewed for her remembrances of the Frank women in Auschwitz in the television documentary The Last Seven Months of Anne Frank (1988) by Dutch filmmaker Willy Lindwer and in the BBC documentary Anne Frank Remembered (1995).

Upon arrival at Auschwitz, the SS forcibly split the men from the women and children, and thus Otto Frank was separated from his family. Those deemed able to work were admitted into the camp; those deemed unfit for labour were immediately killed. Of the 1,019 passengers, 549—including all children younger than 15—were sent directly to the gas chambers. Anne, who had turned 15 three months earlier, was one of the youngest spared from her transport. Soon becoming aware that most people were gassed upon arrival, she never learned that the entire group from the Secret Annex had survived this selection. She reasoned that her father, in his mid-fifties and not particularly robust, had been killed immediately after they were separated.

With the other women and girls not selected for immediate death, Frank was forced to strip naked to be disinfected, her head shaved and her arm tattooed with an identifying number. By day, the women were used as slave labour and Anne was forced to haul rocks and dig rolls of sod; by night, they were crammed into overcrowded barracks. Some witnesses later testified that Anne became withdrawn and tearful when she saw children being led to the gas chambers. Others reported that more often, she displayed strength and courage. Her gregarious and confident nature allowed her to obtain extra bread rations for her mother, her sister and herself. Disease was rampant; before long, Anne's skin became badly infected by scabies. The Frank sisters were moved into an infirmary, which was in a state of constant darkness and infested with rats and mice. Edith Frank stopped eating, saving every morsel of food for her daughters and passing her rations to them through a hole she made at the bottom of the infirmary wall.

In October 1944, the Frank women were scheduled to join a transport to the Liebau labour camp in Lower Silesia. Bloeme Evers-Emden was scheduled to be on this transport, but Anne was prohibited from going because of her scabies and her mother and sister opted to stay with her. Bloeme went on without them.

On 28 October, selections began for women to be relocated to Bergen-Belsen. More than 8,000 women, including Anne and Margot, and Auguste van Pels, were transported. Edith Frank was left behind and died of disease, starvation and exhaustion.

Tents were erected at Bergen-Belsen to accommodate the influx of prisoners; and as the population rose, the death toll due to disease increased rapidly. Anne was briefly reunited with two friends, Hanneli Goslar and Nanette Blitz, who were also confined in the camp. Blitz had been moved from a part of camp called the Sternlager to the same section of the camp as Anne on 5 December 1944, while Goslar had been held in the Sternlager since February 1944. Both women survived the war and later discussed the conversations they had with Anne—Blitz in person and Goslar through a barbed wire fence. Goslar later estimated their meetings had taken place in late January or early February 1945.

Blitz described Anne as bald, emaciated and shivering and wearing only a blanket wrapped around her (as she discarded her uniform due to the lice that was crawling on them), and remarked that "the shock of seeing her in this emaciated state was indescribable". Anne told her that she hoped to write a book based on her diary when the war ended. Goslar noted that Auguste van Pels was with Anne and Margot and that she was caring for Margot, who was severely ill, although she also recalled she did not see Margot because she was too weak to leave her bunk. Blitz, however, stated she met with both the Frank sisters. Anne told both Blitz and Goslar that she believed her parents were dead and for that reason she did not wish to live any longer.

== Death ==
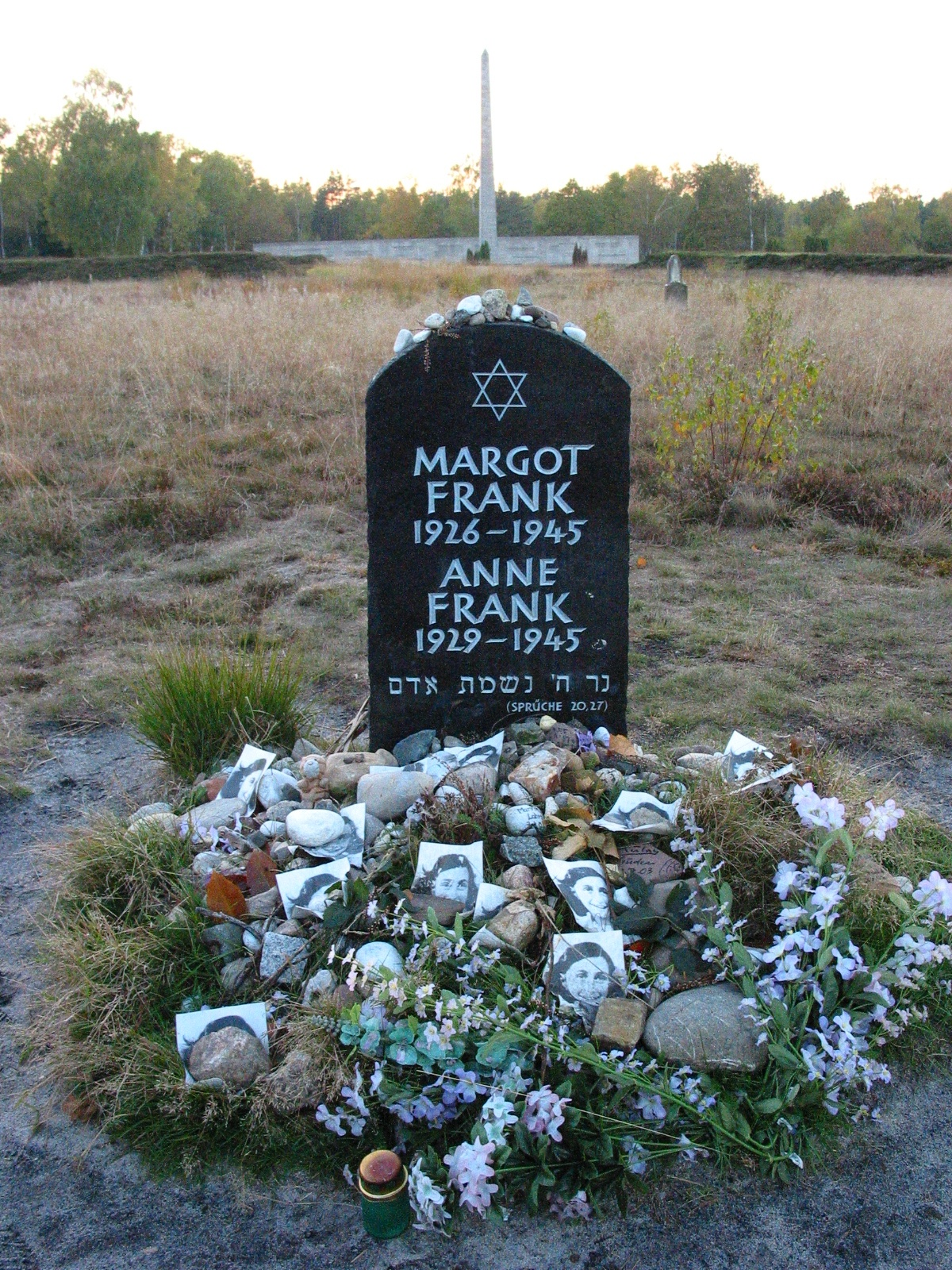
Cenotaph of Margot and Anne Frank at the former Bergen-Belsen labour camp

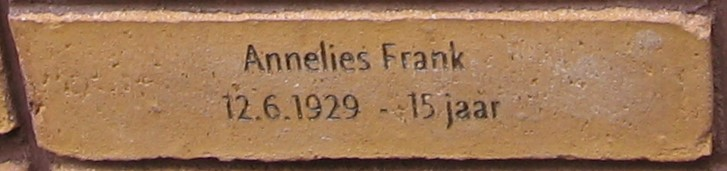
Inscription for Annelies "Anne" Frank at the National Holocaust Names Memorial, Amsterdam, 2023

Anne Frank died at the Bergen-Belsen concentration camp in February or March 1945. Although the specific cause is unknown, there is evidence to suggest that she died from a typhus epidemic that spread through the camp, killing 17,000 prisoners. Gena Turgel, a survivor of Bergen-Belsen who knew Anne at the camp, told the British newspaper The Sun: "Her bed was around the corner from me. She was delirious, terrible, burning up." She also mentioned that she had brought Anne water with which to wash. Turgel, who worked in the camp hospital, added that the epidemic took a terrible toll on the inmates: "The people were dying like flies—in the hundreds. Reports used to come in—500 people who died. Three hundred? We said, 'Thank God, only 300.'" Other diseases, including typhoid fever, were rampant.

Witnesses later testified that Margot fell from her bunk in her weakened state and was killed by the shock, and that Anne died a day after Margot. The dates of Margot's and Anne's deaths were not recorded. It was long thought that their deaths occurred only a few weeks before British troops liberated the camp on 15 April 1945, but research in 2015 indicated that they may have died as early as February. Among other evidence, witnesses recalled that the sisters displayed typhus symptoms by 7 February, and Dutch health authorities reported that most untreated typhus victims died within twelve days of their first symptoms. Additionally, Hanneli Goslar stated her father, Hans Goslar, died one or two weeks after their first meeting; and it is known that he died on 25 February 1945. Both Anne and Margot were buried together in a mass grave.

After the war, it was estimated that only 5,000 of the 107,000 Jews deported from the Netherlands between 1942 and 1944 survived the war. An estimated 30,000 Jews remained in the Netherlands, many aided by the Dutch underground; and of those, approximately two-thirds survived.

Otto Frank survived his internment in Auschwitz. After the war ended, he returned to Amsterdam in June 1945, where he was sheltered by Jan and Miep Gies as he attempted to locate his family. He learned of the death of his wife, Edith, during his journey to Amsterdam, but remained hopeful that his daughters had survived. After several weeks, he discovered that Margot and Anne had also died. He attempted to determine the fates of his daughters' friends and learned that many had been killed. Sanne Ledermann, often mentioned in Anne's diary, had been gassed along with her parents; but her sister, Barbara Ledermann, a close friend of Margot's, had survived. Several of the Frank sisters' school friends had survived, as had the extended families of Otto and Edith Frank, as they had fled Germany during the mid-1930s, with individual family members settling in Switzerland, the United Kingdom and the United States.

== The Diary of a Young Girl ==
=== Publication ===
Het Achterhuis (literally, "the rear house"), the first Dutch edition of Frank's diary, published in 1947, later translated into English as The Diary of a Young Girl

In July 1945, after the sisters Janny and Lien Brilleslijper, who were with Anne and Margot Frank in Bergen-Belsen, confirmed the deaths of the sisters, Miep Gies gave Anne's father her notebooks (including the red-and-white checkered diary) and a bundle of loose notes that she and Bep Voskuijl had saved in the hope of returning them to Anne. Otto Frank later commented that he had not realized Anne had kept such an accurate and well-written record of their time in hiding. In his memoir, he described the painful process of reading the diary, recognizing the events described and recalling that he had already heard some of the more amusing episodes read aloud by his daughter. He saw for the first time the more private side of his daughter and those sections of the diary she had not discussed with anyone, noting: "For me it was a revelation ... I had no idea of the depth of her thoughts and feelings ... She had kept all these feelings to herself."

Anne's diary began as a private expression of her thoughts. She wrote several times that she would never allow anyone to read it. She candidly described her life, her family and companions and their situation, while beginning to recognize her ambition to write fiction for publication. In March 1944, she heard a radio broadcast by Gerrit Bolkestein—a member of the Dutch government in exile, based in London—who said that when the war ended, he would create a public record of the Dutch people's oppression under German occupation. On hearing Bolkestein's mention of the publication of letters and diaries, Anne decided to submit her work when the time came.

She began editing her writing, removing some sections and rewriting others, with a view to publication. Her original notebook was supplemented by additional notebooks and loose-leaf sheets of paper. She created pseudonyms for the members of the household and the helpers. The Van Pels family became Hermann, Petronella, and Peter van Daan; Fritz Pfeffer became Albert Düssell. In this edited version, she addressed each entry to "Kitty", a fictional character in Cissy van Marxveldt's Joop ter Heul novels that Anne enjoyed reading.

Moved by Anne's repeated wish to be an author, Otto Frank began to consider having it published. To produce the first version for publication, he used Anne's original diary, known as "version A", and her edited version, known as "version B". Although he restored the true identities of his own family, he retained all the other pseudonyms. He gave the diary to the historian Annie Romein-Verschoor, but she was unsuccessful in having it published. She then gave it to her husband Jan Romein, and he wrote an article about it titled Kinderstem (A Child's Voice), which was published in the newspaper Het Parool (The Watchword) on 3 April 1946. He wrote that the diary, "stammered out in a child's voice, embodies all the hideousness of fascism, more so than all the evidence at Nuremberg put together." His article attracted attention from publishers, and the diary was published in the Netherlands as Het Achterhuis (The Annex, literally, "the back house") in 1947, followed by five more printings by 1950.

The diary was first published in Germany and France in 1950, and in the United Kingdom in 1952 after being rejected by several publishers. The first American edition, published in 1952 under the title Anne Frank: The Diary of a Young Girl, was positively reviewed. The book was also successful in France and Germany. In the United Kingdom, however, it failed to attract an audience and by 1953 was out of print. Its most noteworthy success was in Japan, where it received critical acclaim and sold more than 100,000 copies in its first edition; and Anne was quickly identified there as an important cultural figure who represented the destruction of youth during the war.

A play by Frances Goodrich and Albert Hackett based on the diary premiered in New York City on 5 October 1955 and later won a Pulitzer Prize for Drama. It was followed by the film The Diary of Anne Frank (1959), a critical and commercial success. Biographer Melissa Müller later wrote that the dramatization had "contributed greatly to the romanticizing, sentimentalizing and universalizing of Anne's story". Over the years the popularity of the diary grew, and in many schools, particularly in the United States, it was included as part of the curriculum, introducing Anne to new generations of readers.

Cornelis Suijk—a former director of the Anne Frank Foundation and president of the U.S. Center for Holocaust Education Foundation—announced in 1999 that he had five pages of the diary which had been removed by Otto Frank before publication. Suijk claimed that Frank gave these pages to him shortly before he died in 1980. The missing entries contain critical remarks by Anne about her parents' strained marriage and discuss her lack of affection for her mother. Some controversy ensued when Suijk claimed publishing rights over the five pages. He intended to sell them to raise money for his foundation, but the Netherlands Institute for War Documentation, the manuscript's formal owner, demanded the pages be handed over. In 2000 the Dutch Ministry of Education, Culture and Science agreed to donate US$300,000 to Suijk's foundation, and the pages were returned in 2001. Since then, they have been included in new editions of the diary.

=== Reception ===
The diary has been praised for its literary merits. Commenting on Anne's writing style, the dramatist Meyer Levin commended her for "sustaining the tension of a well-constructed novel", and was so impressed by the quality of her work that he collaborated with Otto Frank on a dramatization of the diary shortly after its publication. Levin became obsessed with Anne, which he wrote about in his autobiography The Obsession. The poet John Berryman called the book a unique depiction, not merely of adolescence but of the "conversion of a child into a person as it is happening in a precise, confident, economical style stunning in its honesty".

In her introduction to the diary's first American edition, Eleanor Roosevelt described it as "one of the wisest and most moving commentaries on war and its impact on human beings that I have ever read". John F. Kennedy discussed Anne in a 1961 speech, and observed: "Of all the multitudes who throughout history have spoken for human dignity in times of great suffering and loss, no voice is more compelling than that of Anne Frank." In the same year, the Soviet writer Ilya Ehrenburg wrote of her that "one voice speaks for six million—the voice not of a sage or a poet but of an ordinary little girl".

As Anne's stature as both a writer and humanist has grown, she has been discussed specifically as a symbol of the Holocaust and more broadly as a representative of persecution. Hillary Clinton, in her acceptance speech for an Elie Wiesel Humanitarian Award in 1994, read from Anne's diary and spoke of her "awakening us to the folly of indifference and the terrible toll it takes on our young", which Clinton related to contemporary events in Sarajevo, Somalia and Rwanda.

After receiving a humanitarian award from the Anne Frank Foundation in 1994, Nelson Mandela addressed a crowd in Johannesburg, saying he had read Anne's diary while in prison and "derived much encouragement from it". He likened her struggle against Nazism to his struggle against apartheid, drawing a parallel between the two philosophies: "Because these beliefs are patently false, and because they were, and will always be, challenged by the likes of Anne Frank, they are bound to fail." Also in 1994, Václav Havel said, "Anne Frank's legacy is very much alive and it can address us fully," in commenting on the political and social changes occurring at the time in former Eastern Bloc countries.

Fellow Holocaust survivor Primo Levi suggested that Anne was frequently identified as a single representative of the millions of people who suffered and died as she did because "[o]ne single Anne Frank moves us more than the countless others who suffered just as she did but whose faces have remained in the shadows. Perhaps it is better that way; if we were capable of taking in all the suffering of all those people, we would not be able to live." Miep Gies expressed a similar thought in her closing message in Müller's biography of Anne, though she attempted to dispel what she felt was a growing misconception that "Anne symbolizes the six million victims of the Holocaust," and commented: "Anne's life and death were her own individual fate, an individual fate that happened six million times over. Anne cannot, and should not, stand for the many individuals whom the Nazis robbed of their lives ... But her fate helps us grasp the immense loss the world suffered because of the Holocaust."

Otto Frank spent the remainder of his life as custodian of his daughter's legacy, remarking: "It's a strange role. In the normal family relationship, it is the child of the famous parent who has the honour and the burden of continuing the task. In my case the role is reversed." He recalled his publisher's explanation of why he thought the diary has been so widely read with the comment that "he said that the diary encompasses so many areas of life that each reader can find something that moves him personally." Simon Wiesenthal expressed a similar sentiment when he said that the diary had raised more widespread awareness of the Holocaust than had been achieved during the Nuremberg Trials, because "people identified with this child. This was the impact of the Holocaust, this was a family like my family, like your family and so you could understand this."

In June 1999, Time magazine published a special edition titled "Time 100: The Most Important People of the Century". Anne Frank was selected as one of the "Heroes & Icons", and the writer Roger Rosenblatt described her legacy with the comment: "The passions the book ignites suggest that everyone owns Anne Frank, that she has risen above the Holocaust, Judaism, girlhood and even goodness and become a totemic figure of the modern world—the moral individual mind beset by the machinery of destruction, insisting on the right to live and question and hope for the future of human beings." Noting that although her courage and pragmatism were admired, her ability to analyze herself and the quality of her writing were the key components of her appeal; and thus "[t]he reason for her immortality was basically literary. She was an extraordinarily good writer, for any age, and the quality of her work seemed a direct result of a ruthlessly honest disposition".

=== Denials of authenticity and legal action ===
After the diary became widely known in the late 1950s, various allegations against its veracity and contents appeared, with the earliest published criticisms occurring in Sweden and Norway. In 1957, Fria ord (Free Words), the magazine of the Swedish neofascist organization National League of Sweden, published an article by Danish author and critic Harald Nielsen, who had previously written antisemitic articles about the Danish-Jewish author Georg Brandes. Among other things, his article claimed that the diary had been written by Meyer Levin.

In 1958, at a performance of The Diary of Anne Frank in Vienna, Simon Wiesenthal was challenged by a group of protesters who asserted that Anne Frank had never existed, and challenged Wiesenthal to prove her existence by finding the man who had arrested her. Wiesenthal indeed began searching for Karl Silberbauer and found him in 1963. When interviewed, Silberbauer admitted his role and identified Anne from a photograph as one of the people he arrested. Silberbauer provided a full account of events, even recalling emptying a briefcase full of papers onto the floor. His statement corroborated the version of events that had previously been presented by witnesses such as Otto Frank.

In 1959, Otto Frank took legal action in Lübeck against Lothar Stielau, a schoolteacher and former Hitler Youth member who published a school paper describing the diary as a forgery. The complaint was extended to include Heinrich Buddegerg, who wrote a letter in support of Stielau that was published in a Lübeck newspaper. The court examined the diary in 1960 and authenticated the handwriting as matching that in letters known to have been written by Anne Frank, declaring the diary to be genuine. Stielau recanted his earlier statement, and Otto Frank did not pursue the case further.

In 1976, Otto Frank took action against Heinz Roth of Frankfurt, who also stated that the diary was a forgery and published pamphlets on the subject. The judge ruled that if Roth were to publish any further statements, he would be subjected to a fine of 500,000 Deutsche marks and a six-month jail sentence. Roth appealed the court's decision, but he died in 1978 and after a year his appeal was rejected.

Otto Frank mounted a lawsuit in 1976 against a third promoter of disbelief in the diary's authenticity, Ernst Römer, who distributed a pamphlet titled "The Diary of Anne Frank, Bestseller, A Lie". When a man named Edgar Geiss distributed the same pamphlet in the courtroom, he too was prosecuted. Römer was fined 1,500 Deutsche marks, and Geiss was sentenced to six months' imprisonment. The sentence of Geiss was reduced on appeal, however, and the case was eventually dropped following a subsequent appeal because the time limit for filing a libel case had expired.

With Otto Frank's death in 1980, the original diary, including letters and loose sheets, was willed to the Dutch Institute for War Documentation, which commissioned a forensic study of the diary through the Netherlands Ministry of Justice in 1986. They examined the handwriting against known examples and found a match. They also determined that paper, glue and ink were readily available during the time the diary was said to have been written. They concluded that the diary was authentic, and their findings were published in what has become known as the "Critical Edition" of the diary. In 1990, the Hamburg Regional Court confirmed the diary's authenticity.

In 1991, two Holocaust deniers—Robert Faurisson and Siegfried Verbeke—produced a booklet titled The Diary of Anne Frank: A Critical Approach, in which they revived the allegation that Otto Frank wrote the diary. Purported evidence, as before, included several contradictions in the diary: that the prose style and handwriting were not those of a teenager, and that hiding in the Secret Annex would have been impossible. In 1993, the Anne Frank House in Amsterdam and the Anne Frank Fonds (Foundation) in Basel filed a civil lawsuit to prohibit further distribution of Faurisson and Verbeke's booklet in the Netherlands. In 1998, the Amsterdam District Court ruled in favor of the claimants, forbade any further denial of the authenticity of the diary and unsolicited distribution of publications to that effect, and imposed a penalty of 25,000 guilders per infringement.

=== Censored sections ===
Since the original publication of the diary, several sections of Anne's diaries that were initially edited out have been revealed and included in new editions. These contain passages relating to her bisexuality, exploration of her genitalia and thoughts on menstruation. Following the conclusion of an ownership dispute in 2001, new editions have also incorporated pages removed by Otto Frank prior to publication that contain critical remarks about her parents' strained marriage and discuss her difficult relationship with her mother. Two additional pages that Anne had pasted over with brown paper were deciphered in 2018, and contained an attempt to explain sex education and a handful of "dirty" jokes.

== Legacy ==
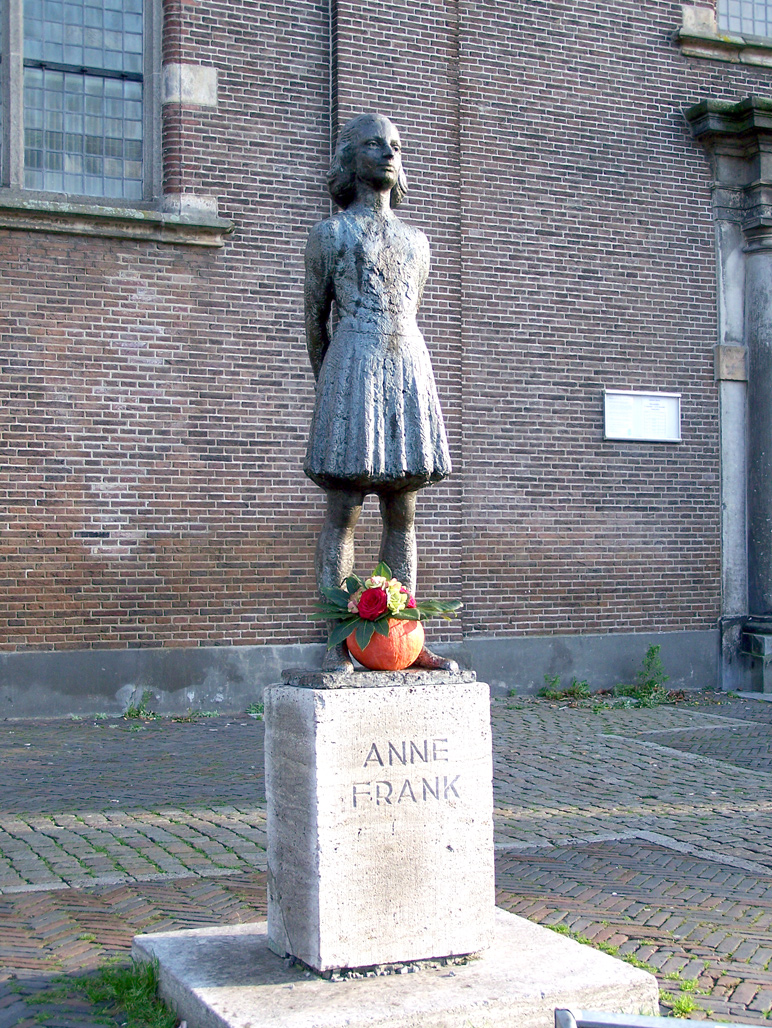
Sculpture by Pieter d'Hont (1959) in Utrecht, Netherlands

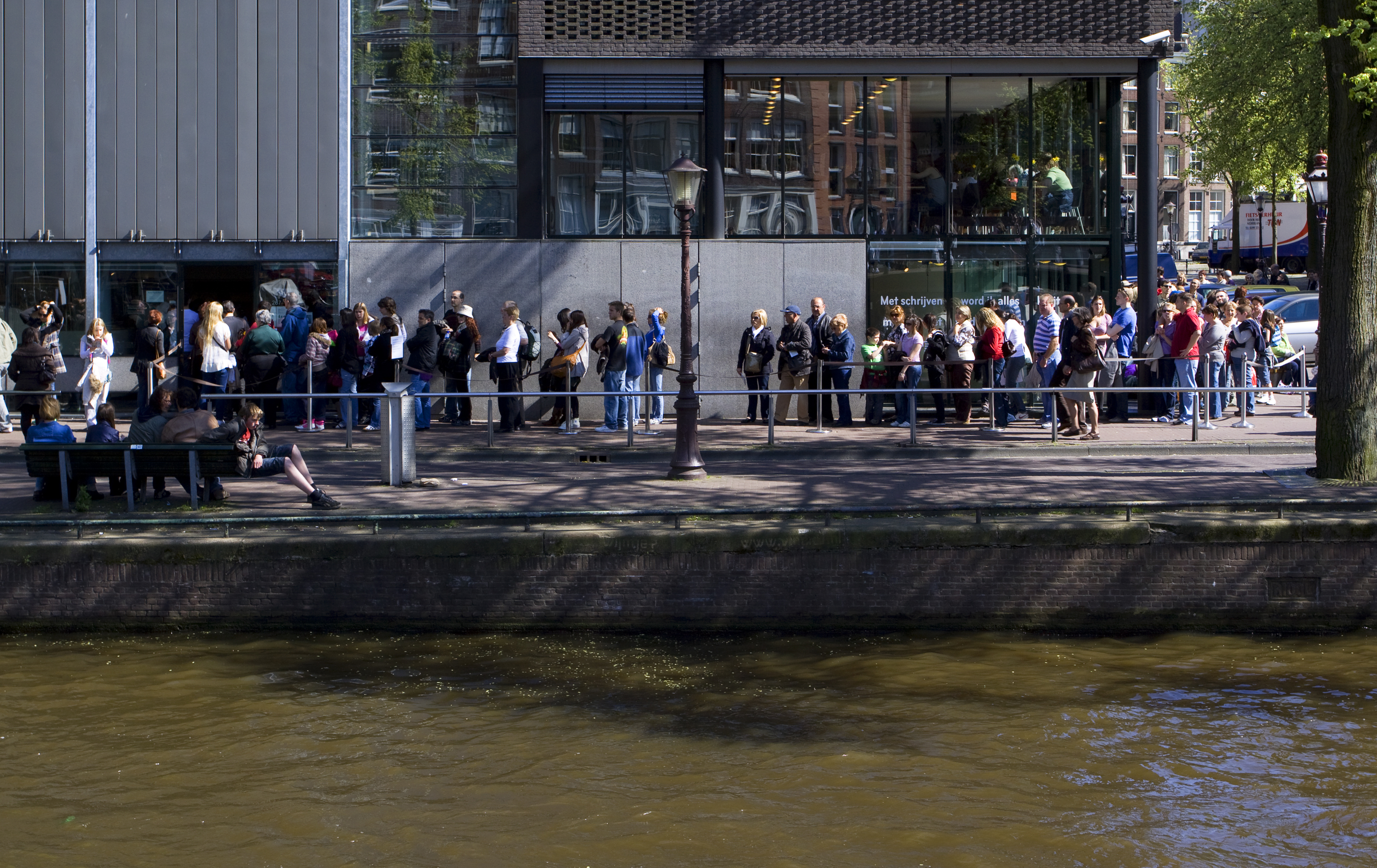
People waiting in line in front of the Anne Frank House entrance in Amsterdam

On 3 May 1957, a group of Dutch citizens, including Otto Frank, established the Anne Frank Foundation (Anne Frank Stichting) to rescue the Prinsengracht building from demolition and to make it accessible to the public. The Anne Frank House opened on 3 May 1960, consisting of the Opekta warehouse and offices and the Secret Annex—all unfurnished so visitors can walk freely through the rooms.

The House provides information via the internet and offers exhibitions. From the small room that was once home to Peter van Pels, a walkway connects the building to its neighbours, also purchased by the Foundation. These other buildings are used to house the diary, as well as rotating exhibits that chronicle aspects of the Holocaust and more contemporary examinations of racial intolerance around the world. One of Amsterdam's main tourist attractions, it received an average of 1.2 million visitors between 2011 and 2020.

In 1963, Otto Frank and his second wife, Elfriede Geiringer-Markovits, set up the Anne Frank Fonds as a charitable foundation, based in Basel, Switzerland. Upon his death, Otto willed the diary's copyright to the Fonds, on the provision that the first 80,000 Swiss francs in income to it each year was to be distributed to his heirs. The Anne Frank Fonds represents the Frank family and administers the rights, inter alia, to the writings of Anne and Otto Frank and the letters of the Frank family. The Fonds educates young people against racism, and loaned some of Anne's papers to the United States Holocaust Memorial Museum in Washington for an exhibition in 2003. Its annual report that year outlined its efforts to contribute on a global level, with support for projects in Germany, Israel, India, Switzerland, the United Kingdom and the United States.

In 1997, the Anne Frank Educational Centre (Jugendbegegnungsstätte Anne Frank) was opened in the Dornbusch neighbourhood of Frankfurt, where Anne lived with her family until 1934. The centre is "a place where both young people and adults can learn about the history of National Socialism and discuss its relevance to today".

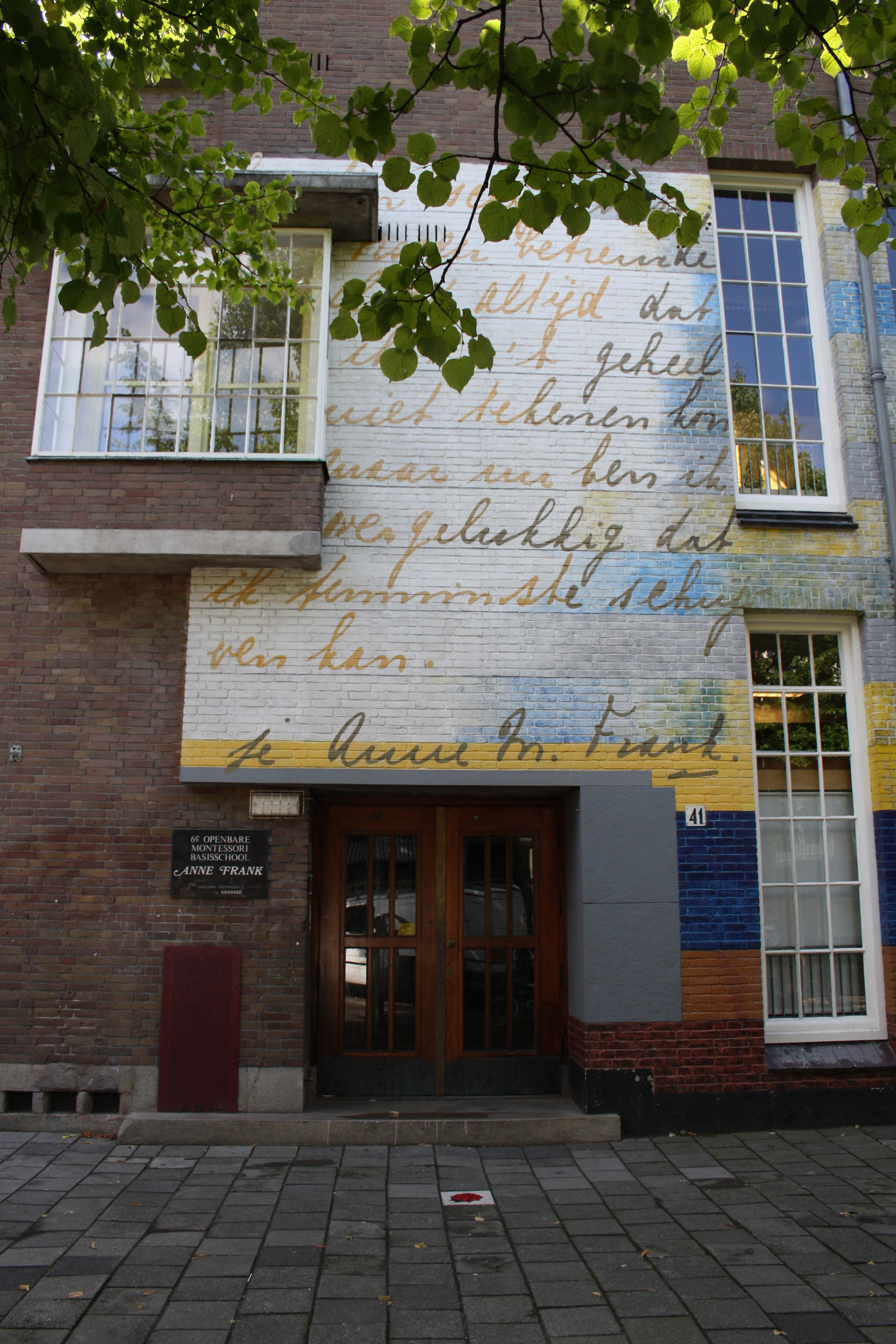
The Anne Frank School in Amsterdam

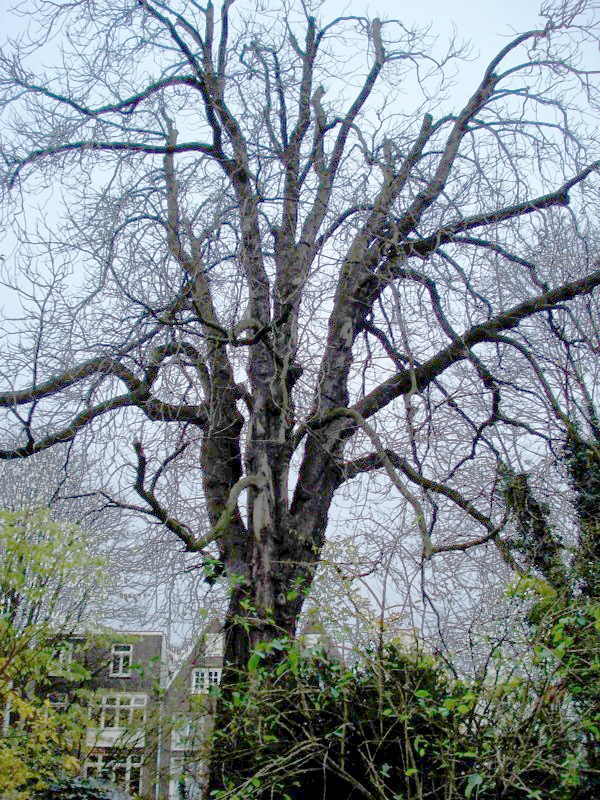
The Anne Frank tree in the garden behind the Anne Frank House

The Merwedeplein apartment, where the Frank family lived from 1933 until 1942, remained privately owned until the 2000s. After featuring in a television documentary, the building—in a serious state of disrepair—was purchased by a Dutch housing corporation. Aided by photographs taken by the Frank family and descriptions in letters written by Anne, it was restored to its 1930s appearance. Teresien da Silva of the Anne Frank House and Frank's cousin, Bernhard "Buddy" Elias, contributed to the restoration project, which opened in 2005. Each year, a writer who is unable to write freely in the writer's own country is selected for a year-long tenancy, during which the writer resides and writes in the apartment. The first writer selected was the Algerian novelist and poet El-Mahdi Acherchour.

Anne Frank is included as one of the topics in the Canon of the Netherlands, which was prepared by a committee headed by Frits van Oostrom and presented to the Minister of Education, Culture and Science, Maria van der Hoeven, in 2006. The Canon is a list of fifty topics that aims to provide a chronological summary of Dutch history to be taught in primary schools and the first two years of secondary school in the Netherlands. A revised version, which still includes Anne as one of the topics, was presented to the Dutch government on 3 October 2007 and approved in 2020.

In June 2007, "Buddy" Elias donated some 25,000 family documents to the Anne Frank House. Among the artefacts are Frank's family photographs taken in Germany and the Netherlands and the letter Otto Frank sent his mother in 1945, informing her that his wife and daughters had perished in Nazi concentration camps.

In November 2007, the Anne Frank tree—a horse-chestnut tree that Anne could see from the Annex and later named after her—was by then infected with a fungal disease affecting the trunk and scheduled to be cut down to prevent it from falling on the surrounding buildings. Dutch economist Arnold Heertje said about the tree: "This is not just any tree. The Anne Frank tree is bound up with the persecution of the Jews." The Tree Foundation, a group of tree conservationists, started a civil case to stop the felling of the horse-chestnut, which received international media attention. A Dutch court ordered city officials and conservationists to explore alternatives and come to a solution. The parties built a steel construction that was expected to prolong the life of the tree up to 15 years. However, only three years later, on 23 August 2010, gale-force winds blew down the tree.

Eleven saplings from the tree were distributed to museums, schools, parks and Holocaust remembrance centres through a project led by the Anne Frank Center USA. The first sapling was planted in April 2013 at The Children's Museum of Indianapolis. Saplings were also sent to a school in Little Rock, Arkansas, the scene of a desegregation battle; Liberty Park (Manhattan), which honours victims of the September 11 attacks; and other sites in the United States. Another horse-chestnut tree honouring Anne was planted in 2010 at Kelly Ingram Park in Birmingham, Alabama.

Over the years, various films about Anne Frank have been produced. Her life and writings have inspired a diverse group of artists and social commentators to make reference to her in literature, popular music, television, and other media. These include The Anne Frank Ballet by Adam Darius, first performed in 1959, and the choral works Annelies (2005) and The Beauty That Still Remains by Marcus Paus (2015).

The only known film footage of Anne Frank herself comes from a silent 20-second film of her next-door neighbour's wedding, in which she is seen leaning out of a second-floor window in an attempt to better view the bride and groom, at the nine-second mark. The couple, who survived the war, gave the film to the Anne Frank House museum, which has posted it to YouTube.

In 1999, Time named Anne Frank among the heroes and icons of the 20th century on its list The Most Important People of the Century, stating: "With a diary kept in a secret attic, she braved the Nazis and lent a searing voice to the fight for human dignity". Philip Roth called her the "lost little daughter" of Franz Kafka. Madame Tussauds wax museum unveiled an exhibit featuring a likeness of Anne Frank in 2012. Asteroid 5535 Annefrank was named in her honour in 1995, after its discovery in 1942. In 2009, UNESCO added the diary and other writings of Anne Frank in to its Memory of the World International Register, listing documentary heritage of global importance.

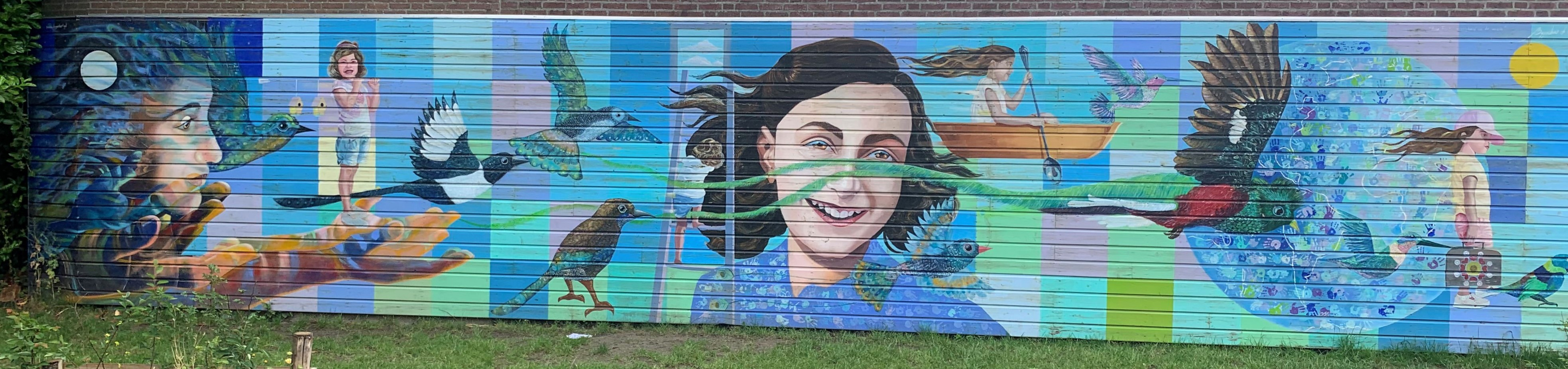
Byron Gómez Chavarría, mural of Frank with birds and handprints of children (2017), Anne Frankschool, Utrecht, Netherlands, 2020

As of 2018, there are over 270 schools named after Frank worldwide. A hundred of them are in Germany, 89 in France, 45 in Italy, 17 in the Netherlands (among them the 6th Montessori School in Amsterdam that Anne herself attended until 1941), four in Brazil, four in the United States (among them the Anne Frank Inspire Academy), two in Bulgaria and one each in Argentina, Belgium, Canada, Colombia, El Salvador, Spain, Hungary, Israel, Nepal, Uruguay and Sweden. By 2024 there were 18 schools in Mexico named after her.

In 2020, the first of a series of Anne Frank Children's Human Rights Memorials was placed adjacent to a high school in Maaleh, Adumim, outside of Jerusalem. In 2021, the second memorial was unveiled in Antigua, Guatemala, and another in Buenos Aires in 2024. In 2023, however, a plan to rename a daycare centre in Tangerhütte, Germany, named for Anne Frank since 1970, was met with international outcry and eventually dropped.

On 25 June 2022, a slideshow Google Doodle was dedicated in honour of Frank marking the 75th anniversary of the publication of her diary.

On 12 June 2026, on Anne Frank's 97th birthday, the Anne Frank Center USA launched @AnneFrankLifeStory, a TikTok and Instagram project aimed at introducing younger individuals to Anne Frank's story and Holocaust education through short-form social media content.

=== ICE controversy ===
In January 2026, following Operation Metro Surge carried out by United States Immigration and Customs Enforcement (ICE), Minnesota governor Tim Walz compared children fearful of immigration enforcement in Minnesota to Anne Frank, saying that future generations might write "that story about Minnesota." The remarks drew criticism from the United States Holocaust Memorial Museum, which said that comparing contemporary political disputes to Anne Frank's experience was a false equivalency. Other Jewish leaders defended Walz's comments, arguing that he was referring to the fear experienced by immigrant children rather than equating their circumstances with the Holocaust.

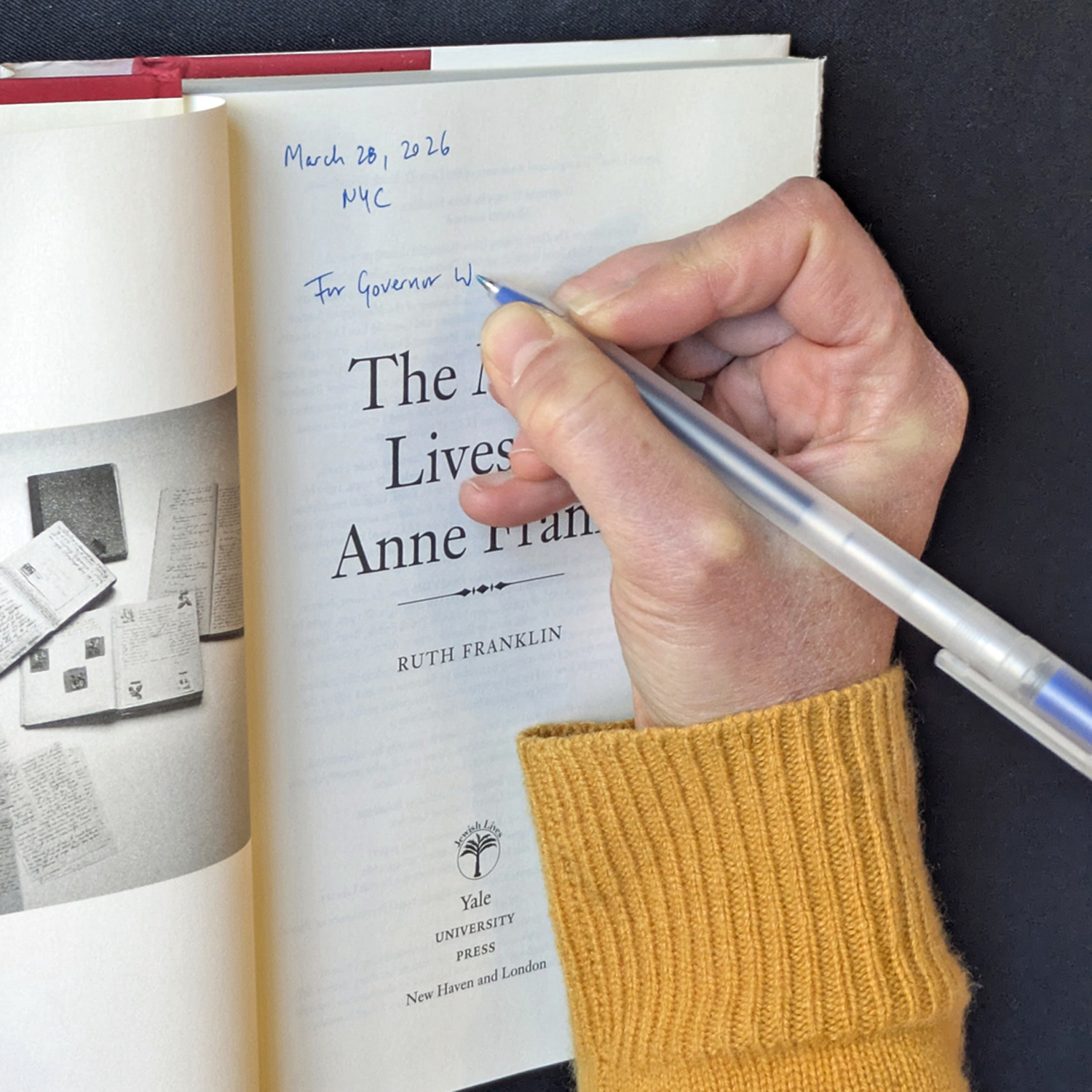
Ruth Franklin signs a copy of The Many Lives of Anne Frank for Tim Walz.

Literary critic Ruth Franklin signed a copy of her book, The Many Lives of Anne Frank, for Walz at a SWAN Day event hosted by Jan Lisa Huttner in March 2026. On June 12, 2026, on Anne Frank's 97th birthday, the signed copy of the book was hand-delivered to Governor Walz's office, along with a DVD copy of the 2003 film Anne B. Real, by members of the Minneapolis branch of the American Association of University Women.

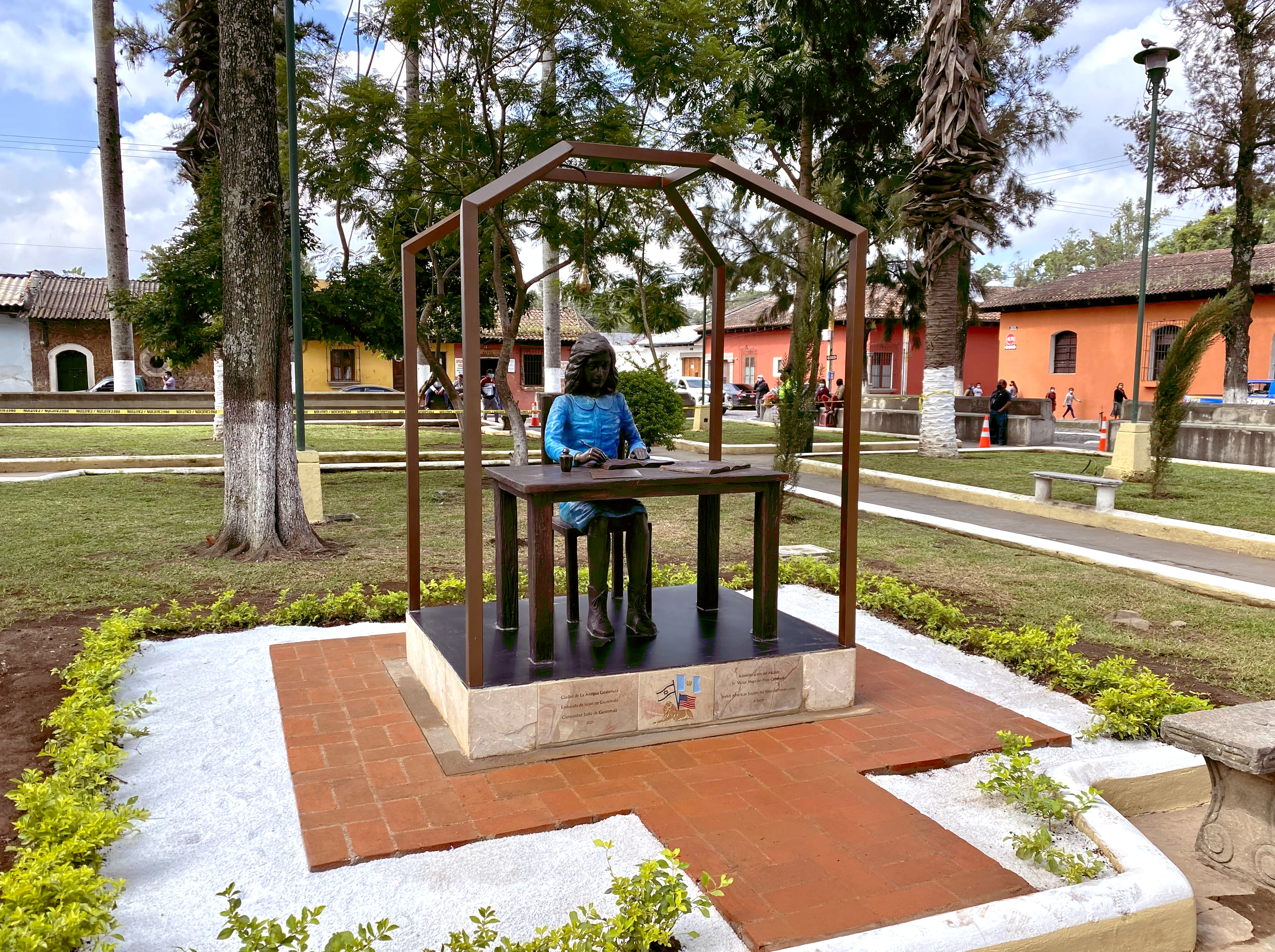
Anne Frank Children's Human Rights Memorial in Antigua, Guatemala

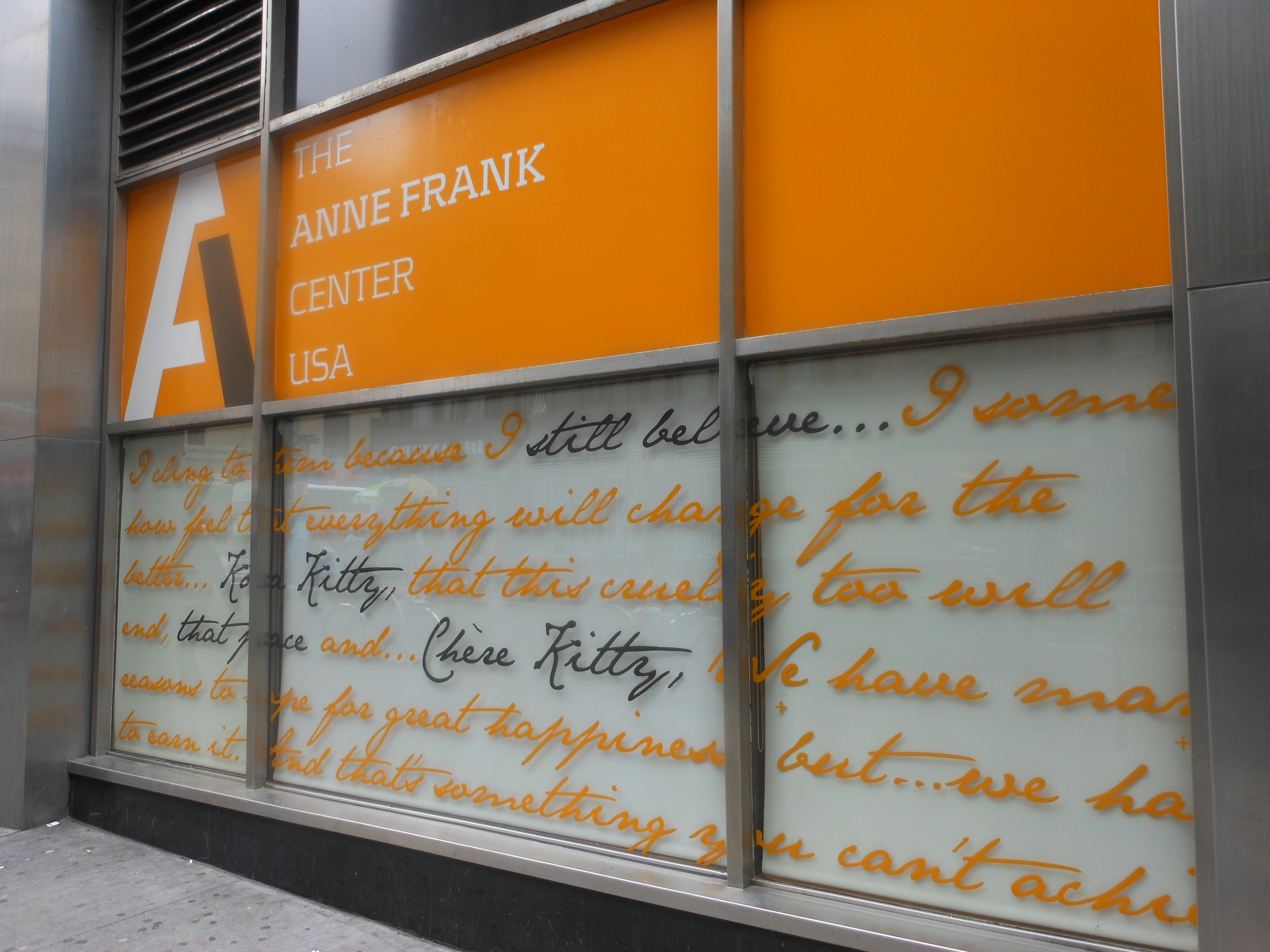
Anne Frank Center in New York

== See also ==
- People associated with Anne Frank
- Searching for Anne Frank: Letters from Amsterdam to Iowa (book)
- List of Holocaust diarists
- List of posthumous publications of Holocaust victims
- Anne Frank Human Rights Memorial

== Notes and references ==
Informational notes

Citations

== Bibliography ==
Books

- Barnouw, David; Van Der Stroom, Gerrold, eds. (2003). The Diary of Anne Frank: The Revised Critical Edition. New York: Doubleday. ISBN 0385508476.
- Berryman, John (2000) [1999]. "The Development of Anne Frank". In Enzer, Hyman Aaron; Solotaroff-Enzer, Sandra (eds.). Anne Frank: Reflections on her life and legacy. Urbana: University of Illinois Press. ISBN 978-0252068232.
- Bigsby, Christopher (2006). Remembering and Imagining the Holocaust: The Chain of Memory. New York: Cambridge University Press. ISBN 978-0521869348.
- Enzer, Hyman Aaron; Solotaroff-Enzer, Sandra, eds. (1999). Anne Frank: Reflections on Her Life and Legacy. Urbana: University of Illinois Press. ISBN 978-0252068232.
- Frank, Anne (1995) [1947]. Frank, Otto H.; Pressler, Mirjam (eds.). Het Achterhuis [The Diary of a Young Girl – The Definitive Edition] (in Dutch). Massotty, Susan (translation). Doubleday. ISBN 0553296981; this edition, a new translation, includes material excluded from the earlier edition.
- Frank, Anne (1989). The Diary of Anne Frank, The Critical Edition. Netherlands State Institute for War Documentation. New York: Doubleday. ISBN 978-0385240239.
- Frank, Anne; Holmer, Per (2005). Anne Franks dagbok : den oavkortade originalutgåvan : anteckningar från gömstället 12 juni 1942 – 1 augusti 1944 [Anne Frank's Diary: The Unabridged Original Edition: Notes From the Hiding Place] (in Swedish). Stockholm: Norstedt. ISBN 978-9113014029.
- Konig, Nanette (2018). Holocaust Memoirs of a Bergen-Belsen Survivor, Classmate of Anne Frank. Amsterdam Publishers. ISBN 978-9492371614.
- Lee, Carol Ann (2000). The Biography of Anne Frank – Roses from the Earth. London: Viking Press. ISBN 978-0708991749.
- Lindwer, Willy (1988). The Last Seven Months of Anne Frank. Netherlands: Gooi & Sticht.
- Müller, Melissa (1999) [1998]. Das Mädchen Anne Frank [Anne Frank: The Biography] (in German). Kimber, Rita and Robert (translators). New York: Henry Holt and Company. ISBN 978-0747545231. OCLC 42369449.; With a note from Miep Gies
- Müller, Melissa (2013) [1998]. Anne Frank: The Biography (in German). New York: Henry Holt and Company. ISBN 978-0805087314.
- Prose, Francine (2009). Anne Frank: The Book, the Life, the Afterlife. New York: HarperCollins. ISBN 978-0061430794.
- Rosow, La Vergne (1996). Light 'n Lively Reads for ESL, Adult, and Teen Readers: A Thematic Bibliography. Englewood, Colo: Libraries Unlimited. p. 156. ISBN 978-1563083655.
- van der Rol, Ruud; Verhoeven, Rian (1995). Anne Frank – Beyond the Diary – A Photographic Remembrance. Translated by Langham, Tony; Peters, Plym. New York: Puffin. ISBN 978-0140369267.
- Verhoeven, Rian (2019). Anne Frank was niet alleen. Het Merwedeplein 1933–1945. Amsterdam: Prometheus. ISBN 978-9044630411.
- Westra, Hans; Metselaar, Menno; Van Der Rol, Ruud; Stam, Dineke (2004). Inside Anne Frank's House: An Illustrated Journey Through Anne's World. Woodstock: Overlook Duckworth. ISBN 978-1585676286.

Online

- "2003 Annual Report". Anne Frank Fonds. 1 July 2004. Archived from the original on 1 March 2012.
- "Biography – Anne Frank". Anne Frank Fonds. Archived from the original on 12 August 2015.
- "Anne Frank House, Annual Report 2005" (PDF). Anne Frank House. March 2006. Archived from the original (PDF) on 16 February 2008.
- Barnauw, David; van der Stroom, Gerrold (25 April 2003). "Who Betrayed Anne Frank?" (PDF). Netherlands Institute for War Documentation, Amsterdam. Archived from the original (PDF) on 31 March 2010.
- Blumenthal, Ralph (10 September 1998). "Five precious pages renew wrangling over Anne Frank". The New York Times. Archived from the original on 16 June 2012.
- "James Whitbourn: Annelies". Chester and Novello. Archived from the original on 17 April 2008.
- Clinton, Hillary (14 April 1994). "Remarks by the First Lady, Elie Wiesel Humanitarian Awards, New York City". Clinton4.nara.gov. Archived from the original on 7 May 2011.
- Engel, Pamela (23 March 2013). "Saplings from Anne Frank's Tree Take Root in US". Yahoo! News. Associated Press. Archived from the original on 3 December 2013.
- Feldman, Ellen (February–March 2005). "Anne Frank in America". American Heritage. 56 (1). Archived from the original on 31 July 2013.
- Ferguson, Kate Katharina (9 March 2012). "Madame Tussauds Unveils Anne Frank Wax Figure". Der Spiegel. Berlin. Archived from the original on 29 April 2012.
- Gabbatt, Adam (2 October 2009). "Holocaust Film footage of Anne Frank posted on YouTube". The Guardian. London. Archived from the original on 8 September 2013.
- Graver, Lawrence. "One Voice Speaks for Six Million: The uses and abuses of Anne Frank's diary". Yale Holocaust Encyclopedia. Yale University Press. Archived from the original on 17 June 2009.
- "Welcome to the Anne Frank educational centre". Jugendbegegnungsstätte Anne Frank. 2012. Archived from the original on 2 October 2011.
- Kreijger, Gilbert (20 November 2007). "Dutch court saves Anne Frank tree from the chop". Reuters. Archived from the original on 3 September 2010.
- Laeredt, Angela (5 May 1995). "Anne Frank: After the diary stopped". The Independent. London. Archived from the original on 25 August 2017.
- Levin, Meyer (15 June 1952). "The Child Behind the Secret Door; An Adolescent Girl's Own Story of How She Hid for Two Years During the Nazi Terror". The New York Times Book Review. Archived from the original on 3 November 2012.
- Mandela, Nelson (15 August 1994). "Address by President Nelson Mandela at the Johannesburg opening of the Anne Frank exhibition at the Museum Africa". African National Congress. Archived from the original on 3 December 2007.
- Marcuse, Harold (7 August 2002). "Lessons from The Diary of Anne Frank". history.ucsb.edu. University of California, Santa Barbara. Archived from the original on 23 November 2004.
- Max, Arthur (25 June 2007). "Anne Frank's Cousin Donates Family Files". The Washington Post. Associated Press. Archived from the original on 11 November 2012.
- McCrum, Robert (1 August 2010). "Anne Frank: was her diary intended as a work of art?". The Guardian. London. Archived from the original on 16 March 2021.
- Michaelsen, Jacob B. (Spring 1997). "Remembering Anne Frank". Judaism: A Quarterly Journal of Jewish Life and Thought. 46 (2).
- Morine, Suzanne (1 December 2007). "People in Anne Frank's Life". Anne Frank Diary Reference.org. Archived from the original on 4 September 2011.
- "Nothospital". Gedenkstätten Bergen-Belsen (in German). Stiftung Niedersächsische Gedenkstätten. Archived from the original on 27 March 2013.
- O'Toole, Emer (2 May 2013). "Anne Frank's diary isn't pornographic – it just reveals an uncomfortable truth". The Guardian. Archived from the original on 14 August 2013.
- "Anne Frank Tree Blown Down". Radio Netherlands. 23 August 2010. Archived from the original on 3 September 2010.
- Romein, Jan. "The publication of the diary: reproduction of Jan Romein's Het Parool article Kinderstem". Anne Frank Museum. Archived from the original on 29 April 2007.
- Rosenblatt, Roger (14 June 1999). "The Diarist Anne Frank". Time. Archived from the original on 6 March 2008.
- Stevens, Mary (1 September 1989). "2 videos recollect life in World War II". Chicago Tribune. Archived from the original on 8 August 2012.
- Stichting, Anne Frank. "Typhus". Betrayed. Anne Frank House. Archived from the original on 17 February 2007.
- Stichting, Anne Frank. "Publicity about Anne Frank and her Diary: Ten questions on the authenticity of the diary of Anne Frank". Anne Frank House. Archived from the original on 5 October 2007.
- Stichting, Anne Frank (20 September 2005). "Reaction decease Simon Wiesenthal". Anne Frank House. Archived from the original on 30 October 2007.
- Stichting, Anne Frank. "What did Otto Frank do to counter the attacks on the authenticity of the diary? Question 7 on the authenticity of the diary of Anne Frank". Anne Frank House. Archived from the original on 21 October 2007.
- Stichting, Anne Frank. "Publicity about Anne Frank and her Diary: Legal rulings". Anne Frank House. Archived from the original on 13 October 2007.
- Thomasson, Emma; Balmforth, Richard (23 January 2008). "Plan agreed to save Anne Frank tree from the axe". Reuters. Archived from the original on 25 July 2012.
- "Holocaust Encyclopedia – The Netherlands". The United States Holocaust Memorial Museum. Archived from the original on 16 April 2010.

Further reading

- Anne Frank's Last Remaining Close Relative, Buddy Elias (Motion picture). BBC News. 25 February 2011. Archived from the original on 10 March 2011.
- Anne Frank: The Only Existing Film Images (Motion picture). Anne Frank House. 22 July 1941. Archived from the original on 28 October 2021 – via YouTube.
- Porat, Dina. "Anne Frank". Jewish Women Encyclopedia. Archived from the original on 2 November 2012.
- Salter, Jessica (5 June 2009). What Anne Frank Might Have Looked Like at 80. The Daily Telegraph (Motion picture). Archived from the original on 10 January 2022.
- Boretz, Carrie (10 March 1995). "Anne Frank's Diary, Unabridged". New York Times. Archived from the original on 2 August 2013.
- Feldhay Brenner, Rachel (1997). Writing as resistance : four women confronting the Holocaust : Edith Stein, Simone Weil, Anne Frank, Etty Hillesum. University Park, Pa: Pennsylvania State University Press. ISBN 027101623X.
- van Wijk-Voskuijl, Joop; De Bruyn, Jeroen (2023). The Last Secret of the Secret Annex: The Untold Story of Anne Frank, Her Silent Protector, and a Family Betrayal. New York: Simon and Schuster. ISBN 978-1982198213.
