= Searching for Anne Frank =

2003 book

Searching for Anne Frank: Letters from Amsterdam to Iowa
- Author: Susan Goldman Rubin
- Genre: Non-fiction
- Publication date: 2003

Searching for Anne Frank: Letters from Amsterdam to Iowa is a 2003 book about Anne Frank and her pen pal, Juanita Wagner. It is written by Susan Goldman Rubin.

== Summary ==
In 1939, a ten-year-old girl named Juanita Wagner was the pen pal of Anne Frank and she only sent two letters. Juanita lived in Danville, Iowa. Juanita and her older sister, Betty (the pen pal of Margot), wondered what had happened to the Franks in the war. After the production of a 1955 show called The Diary of Anne Frank on Broadway, the sisters realized who their pen pals were. The book tells the story of Anne Frank's life and Juanita Wagner's life.

== Reception ==
Roger Sutton, of Horn Book Magazine, reviewed the book saying, "Rubin wisely eschews much retelling of Anne's days in hiding, and her coverage of later events, including the publication and reception of the diary, is illuminating in its demonstration of Anne Frank's reach". A Kirkus Reviews review says, "responded with a long handwritten letter about Anne's capture and death. This letter did not survive. Every bit of information about the time Anne spent in the concentration camp before her death, every photograph--and there are some new ones here--fascinates. However, the bland correspondence, if one can call it that, provides a weak premise for another book about Anne Frank". A Publishers Weekly review says, "Abundant visuals include photos, movie stills and ephemera. Like the text, however, the contrast between the illustrations of wartime Holland and those of homefront America suggests a chasm more than a link".
