= Maingau Clinic of the Red Cross =

Anne Frank was born in this hospital

Coordinates: 50°07′10″N 8°41′17″E

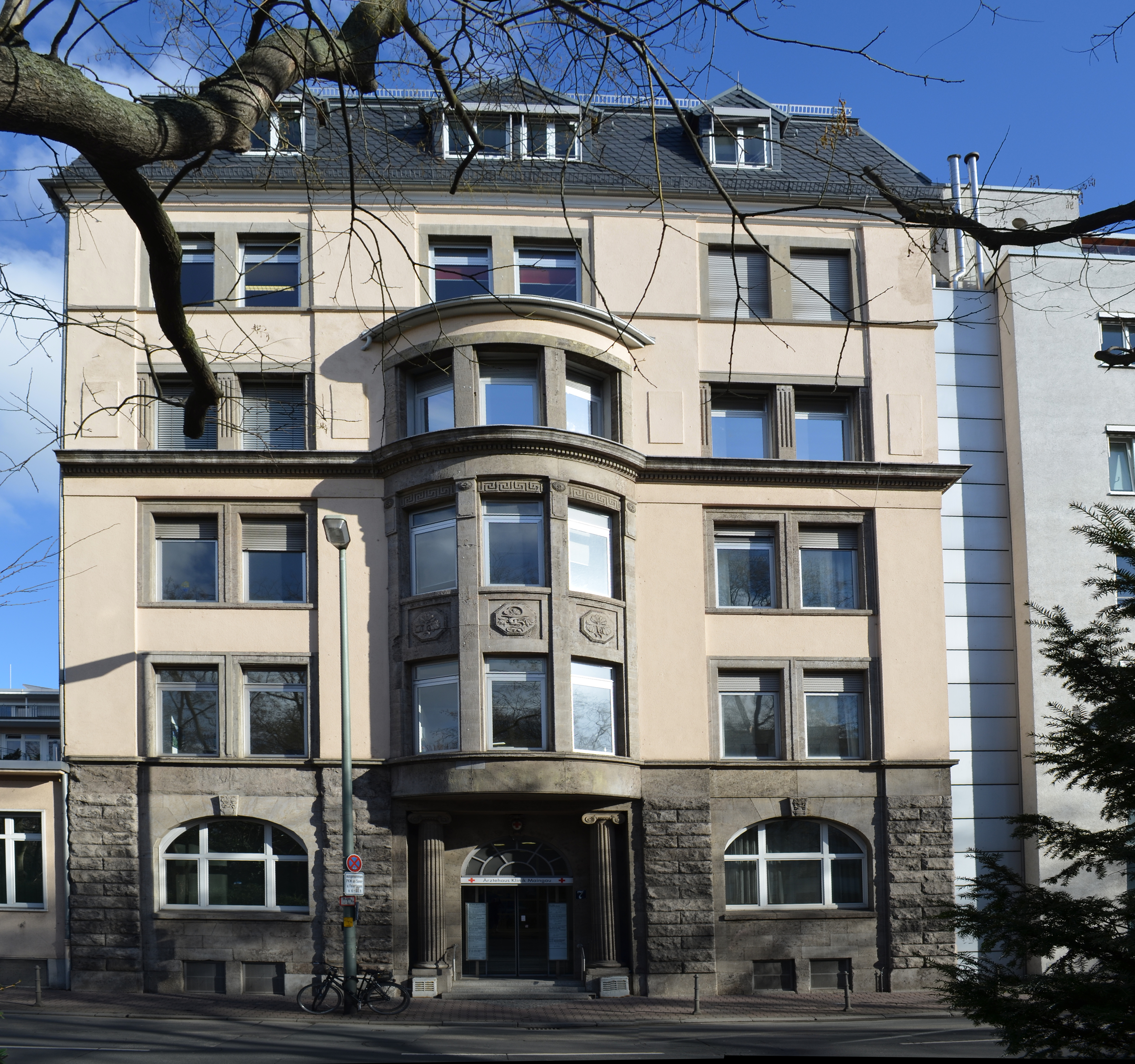
The Maingau Clinic

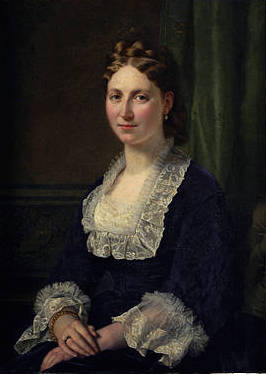
The Frankfurt philanthropist Franziska Speyer contributed significantly to the construction of the clinic

The Maingau Clinic of the Red Cross (German: Klinik Maingau vom Roten Kreuz) is a clinic in Frankfurt, Germany, which is run by the German Red Cross. It is located near the Eschenheimer Anlage park in central Frankfurt, with the address Scheffelstraße 2–14.

The clinic traces its history to the 1890 establishment of the Maingau Nursing Society by the Frankfurt branch of the Patriotic Women's Association. Its main goal was the education of nurses, and for this purpose the society bought a building near the Eschenheimer Anlage. In 1897 the society formally became part of the Red Cross movement, under the name Schwesternschaft Maingau vom Roten Kreuz. In 1912 the current hospital building was formally inaugurated as the Empress Augusta Victoria House. The construction of the hospital was made possible by donations from wealthy citizens and especially by the support from the Frankfurt banker Georg Speyer (1835–1902) and his wife Franziska Speyer (1844–1909), both prominent philanthropists in Frankfurt and members of the Speyer family, one of the city's oldest and most prominent Jewish families. The building was renovated and extended in the 1950s.

Over the years, numerous Frankfurters have been born at the clinic, among them Anne Frank on 12 June, 1929.

The clinic is located just across the street from the Philanthropin, Frankfurt's most renowned Jewish school.
