= Anne Frank Center for Mutual Respect =

U.S. nonprofit organization

- Named after: Anne Frank
- Purpose: Social justice organization
- Headquarters: 244 Fifth Ave J220; New York, NY 10001
- Location: New York City
- Revenue: $698,611 (2014)
- Expenses: $849,836 (2014)
- Staff: 9
- Website: annefrank.com

The Anne Frank Center for Mutual Respect is a nonprofit organization with a focus on civil and human rights activism in the United States.

== History ==
The organization was originally known as the American Friends of the Anne Frank Center. According to the Center, it originated as an affiliate of the Anne Frank House in Amsterdam. Both the House and the Anne Frank Fonds in Basel, Switzerland, are among the Anne Frank Center's worldwide organizational partners. It said on its website that it was founded in 1959 with Anne's father Otto Frank as one of its founders. That was disputed by The Atlantic, which reported in an April 2017 profile of the group that past staffers and documentation indicate it was actually started in 1977, with no involvement by Otto Frank. After the Atlantic article appeared, the organization provided a document from 1959 which shows that Otto Frank gave permission to use of his name in fundraising literature for the Anne Frank Foundation Inc. in the United States and Amsterdam, and that he was listed as president of the Foundation.

It is described by its chairman Peter Rapaport as neither a Jewish nor a Holocaust organization. While it speaks out against antisemitism, it also criticizes what it sees as sexism, racism, Islamophobia, homophobia, transphobia, ableism, and other issues. It is headquartered in New York City and one of its former executive directors was political activist Steven Goldstein, known for his advocacy of LGBT rights as founder of Garden State Equality. It was under Goldstein's leadership that the Center changed its name to add "mutual respect", and broadened its mission to include an emphasis on "exposing and fighting hate".

From 2011 to 2016 the center had a small public gallery in lower Manhattan.

On June 12, 2026, on Anne Frank's 97th birthday, the organization launched @AnneFrankLifeStory, a TikTok and Instagram project aimed at introducing younger audiences to Anne Frank's story and Holocaust education through short-form social media content.

== Criticism of the Trump Administration ==
The center received significant press attention in early 2017 due to its criticism of the Trump administration claiming it has failed to counter antisemitism and for his policies concerning refugees and immigrants. Following the presidential 2016 election, Liel Leibovitz writing in The Tablet, described it as "one of the loudest voices in the #resistance to Trump.". In February 2017, after the administration condemned threats against Jewish institutions, Goldstein called Trump's "sudden acknowledgment" of antisemitism " a "Band-Aid on the cancer of anti-Semitism that has infected his own administration."

Goldstein called for Sean Spicer's resignation after his comment that, unlike Bashar al-Assad, "Hitler didn't even sink to the level of using chemical weapons." He called for Sebastian Gorka's resignation in response to allegations that the Order of Vitéz, of which Gorka is a member, is an antisemitic, Hungarian ultranationalist group.

The Atlantic and the daily online Jewish news site Tablet Magazine criticized the center for politicizing Anne Frank's legacy in its criticism of the Donald Trump administration. The magazines said that the media has paid undue attention to the Center because of its use of Anne Frank's name, and The Atlantic said that by "politicizing Anne Frank" it may undermine her legacy.

Abraham Foxman, former head of the Anti-Defamation League, told the Israeli newspaper Haaretz that he believed Frank's name was abused and that "every time I read that he [Goldstein] says something under her banner, I feel uncomfortable." Foxman was himself a hidden child during the Holocaust.

In a Washington Post profile, Goldstein rejected accusations that he is politicizing Anne Frank and called her "one of the greatest feminist and social justice leaders in history."

Goldstein resigned from the center in September 2017.
