= List of Austrian women writers =

This is a list of women writers who were born in Austria or whose writings are closely associated with that country.

== A ==
- Emma Adler (1858–1935), journalist, historical novelist, non-fiction writer, newspaper publisher, translator
- Ilse Aichinger (1921–2016), essayist, non-fiction writer, novelist, acclaimed for her works on Nazi atrocities
- Renate Aichinger (born 1976), playwright, theatre director
- Rachel Akerman (1522–1544), early Jewish poet, author of Geheimniss des Hofes
- Ruth Aspöck (born 1947), novelist, short story writer, poet
- Susanne Ayoub (born 1956), Austrian-Iraqi novelist, journalist filmmaker

== B ==
- Ingeborg Bachmann (1926–1973), poet, playwright for radio, essayist, short story writer
- Bettina Balàka (born 1966), novelist, poet, playwright, short story writer
- Ilse Barea-Kulcsar (1902–1973), journalist, translator and writer; also a communist activist
- Vicki Baum (1888–1960), novelist, famous for Menschen im Hotel filmed as Grand Hotel
- Elsa Bernstein (1866–1949), playwright, wrote an account of her imprisonment at Theresienstadt concentration camp
- Kirstin Breitenfellner (born 1966), novelist, journalist, critic, yoga teacher
- Christine Busta (1915–1987), poet, children's writer

== C ==
- Ada Christen (1839–1901), poet, short story writer, and writer of sketches
- Monika Czernin (born 1965), writer, screenwriter and film director

== D ==
- Beatrice von Dovsky (1866–1923), poet, actress, remembered above all for her libretto for Max von Schillings' Mona Lisa
- Helene von Druskowitz (1856–1918), playwright, critic, poet

== E ==
- Marie von Ebner-Eschenbach (1830–1916), psychological novelist, playwright, short story writer, important literary figure of the late 19th century
- Bertha Eckstein-Diener (1874–1948), journalist, feminist historian, travel writer, used the pen name Sir Galahad

== F ==
- Lilian Faschinger (born 1950), novelist, short story writer, poet, translator
- Vera Ferra-Mikura (1923–1997), children's writer
- Alexandra Föderl-Schmid (born 1971), journalist, newspaper editor
- Barbara Frischmuth (1941–2025), novelist, poet, playwright, children's writer, translator
- Marianne Fritz (1948–2007), novelist
- Camilla Frydan (1887–1949), soprano, composer and lyricist

== G ==
- Elfriede Gerstl (1932–2009), poet, novelist, essayist, short story writer, feminist contributions
- Anna Gmeyner (1902–1991), British-Austrian novelist, playwright, scriptwriter, wrote in both German and English
- Marie Eugenie Delle Grazie (1864–1931), poet, playwright, novelist
- Alice Gurschner (1869–1944), novelist, playwright, poet
- Lili Grün (1904–1942), writer, actress

== H ==
- Maja Haderlap (born 1961), bilingual Slovenian-German Austrian writer.
- Enrica von Handel-Mazzetti (1871–1955), poet, historical novelist
- Marlen Haushofer (1920–1970), novelist, short story writer, author of Die Wand, translated as The Wall (Haushofer novel)
- Stella K. Hershan (1915–2014), Austrian-American novelist and biographer
- Edith Hörandner (1939–2008), folklorist

== I ==
- Eva Ibbotson (1925–2010), Austrian-born English-language writer, novelist, best known as a children's writer
- Lotte Ingrisch (1930–2022), prolific novelist, playwright, television screenwriter

== J ==
- Maria Janitschek (1859–1927), pen name Marius Stein, poet, short story writer
- Christine Maria Jasch (born 1960), economist, non-fiction writer
- Elfriede Jelinek (born 1946), playwright, novelist, poet, translator, Nobel Prize in 2004, several novels published in English

== K ==
- Gina Kaus (1893–1985), Austrian-American novelist, screenwriter, autobiographer
- Marie-Thérèse Kerschbaumer (born 1936), successful novelist, poet
- Margarete Kollisch (1893–1979), poet, journalist, translator
- Susanna Kubelka (1942–2024), journalist, widely translated novelist

== L ==
- Minna Lachs (1907–1993), educator and memoirist
- Christine Lavant (1915–1973), mystically religious poet, novelist
- Auguste Lechner (1905–2000), folk story writer
- Käthe Leichter (1895–1942), politician, economist, journalist
- Gerda Lerner (1920–2013), Austrian-born English-language playwright, non-fiction author, feminist
- Cvetka Lipuš (born 1966), Slovene-language poet, translated into English
- Mira Lobe (1913–1995), prolific children's writer, some works published in English

== M ==
- Dorothea Macheiner (born 1943), novelist, essayist, poet, playwright
- Ruth Mader (born 1974), screenwriter, wrote and directed Struggle
- Ruth Maier (1920–1942), diarist, described her experiences of the Nazis from 1933 until she was sent to Auschwitz
- Rosa Mayreder (1858–1938), feminist writer, women's rights campaigner
- Friederike Mayröcker (1924–2021), important contemporary poet, playwright
- Eva Menasse (born 1970), journalist, novelist
- Helene Migerka (1867–1928), poet, prose writer
- Olga Misař (1876–1950), peace activist, feminist, writer
- Anna Mitgutsch (born 1948), fiction wr., essayist
- Hermynia zur Mühlen (1883–1951), novelist, translator
- Doris Mühringer (1920–2009), poet, short story writer, children's writer
- Anitta Müller-Cohen (1890–1962), journalist, social worker, politician
- Melissa Müller (born 1967), journalist, novelist, author of Anne Frank: The Biography (1920–1942)

== N ==
- Marie von Najmajer (1844–1904), historical novelist, poet, playwright, women's activist
- Christine Nöstlinger (1936–2018), highly acclaimed children's writer, several works published in English

== O ==
- Blanche Christine Olschak (1913–1989), journalist, encyclopaedia writer
- Doris Orgel (1929–2021), Austrian-born English-language children's writer, non-fiction writer on Asian topics

== P ==
- Bertha Pappenheim (1859–1936), short story writer, playwright, poet, children's writer
- Hertha Pauli (1906–1973), journalist, children's writer, non-fiction writer, wrote in both German and English
- Ida Laura Pfeiffer (1797–1858), early travel writer, translated into seven languages
- Karoline Pichler (1769–1843), novelist, libretto writer
- Hella Pick (1929–2024), Austrian-born British journalist, also non-fiction works
- Adelheid Popp (1869–1939), feminist writer and journalist, autobiographer
- Katharina Prato (1818–1897), cookbook writer
- Paula von Preradović (1887–1951), poet, wrote the words to the Austrian national anthem: Land der Berge, Land am Strome
- Eva Priester (1910–1982), journalist, poet and socialist activist
- Theresa Pulszky (1819–1866), Hungarian history and travel writer

== R ==
- Elisabeth Reichart (born 1953), novelist, playwright, short story writer
- Kathrin Röggla (born 1971), playwright, essayist, poet

== S ==
- Sophie von Scherer (1817–1876), epistolary novelist
- Helene Scheu-Riesz (1880–1970), children's writer, publisher and women's rights activist
- Adele Schreiber-Krieger (1872–1957), feminist writer, politician
- Carolina Schutti (born 1976), novelist, biographer, non-fiction writer, literary scholar, educator
- Brigitte Schwaiger (1949–2010), best-selling novelist
- Barbara Schurz (born 1973), poststructuralist writer, playwright, co-authoring with Alexander Brener
- Lore Segal (1928–2024), Austrian-born American novelist, short story writer, children's writer
- Gitta Sereny (1921–2012), journalist, biographer, non-fiction works, wrote in both German and English
- Hilde Spiel (1911–1990), journalist, essayist, critic
- Bertha von Suttner (1843–1914), novelist, short story writer, essayist, pacifist, Nobel Peace Prize, some works published in English

== T ==
- Franziska Tausig (c. 1895–1989), Jewish emigrant to Shanghai, memoirs published as Shanghai Passage: Flucht und Exil einer Wienerin (Escape and Exile of a Viennese Woman)
- Maria von Trapp (1905–1987), Austrian-American writer, famous for her The Story of the Trapp Family Singers
- Maria Treben (1907–1991), herbalist, famous for her Gesundheit aus der Apotheke Gottes - Ratschläge und Erfahrungen mit Heilkräutern (Health Through God's Pharmacy) translated into 24 languages

== V ==
- Hannelore Valencak (1929–2004), novelist, poet, children's writer

== W ==
- Marion Wiesel (born Mary Renate Erster; 1931–2025), Austrian-American Holocaust survivor, humanitarian, writer, and translator

== Z ==
- Birgit Zotz (born 1979), non-fiction writer, essayist, writings on Buddhist culture, mysticism, tourism
- Berta Zuckerkandl (1864–1945), journalist, critic, non-fiction writer

== See also ==
- List of Austrian writers
- List of women writers
