= List of people from Oldenburg =

A list of notable people from Oldenburg, Germany

== Honorary citizens ==
- 1917: Paul von Hindenburg, General and later President of Germany during the Weimar Republic
- 1928: Dr. h.c. Helene Lange, Politician (DDP) and women's rights activist
- 1963: Prof. Dr. Dr. h.c. Karl Jaspers, philosopher, psychiatrist and political author
- 1992: Horst Janssen, printmaker

== Famous people from Oldenburg ==
- Christian of Oldenburg (1426–1481), king of the Kalmar Union.
- John V, Count of Oldenburg (1460–1526), Count of Oldenburg
- Burkhard Christoph von Munnich (1683–1767), military commander, political figure
- Johann Friedrich Herbart (1776–1841), Göttingen, philosopher, psychologist and teacher
- Sophie Löwe (1815–1866), opera soprano
- Marie Frederike Amelie (1818–1875), Princess of Oldenburg and Queen of Greece 1836–1862
- Helene Lange (1848–1930), politician, teacher and women's rights activist
- Friedrich August, Duke of Oldenburg (1852–1918)
- Dr. Karl Rudolf Heinze (1865–1928), prime minister of Saxony October 26 to November 13, 1918, and Governor of Saxony 1923
- Karl Jaspers (1883–1969), philosopher and author
- Otto Suhr (1894–1957), politician SPD and Lord Mayor of Berlin
- Ulrike Meinhof (1934–1976), journalist and militant (Red Army Faction)
- Robert Alexy (1945–2026), jurist and legal philosopher
- Heiko Daxl (1957), media artist
- Andrea Clausen (1959), actress at Burgtheater in Vienna
- Thyra von Westernhagen (1973), Hanoverian princess by marriage
- Hans-Jörg Butt (1974), football player
- Johannes Bitter (1982), handball player, goalie of the German international team
- Klaas Heufer-Umlauf (1983), host and actor

== Famous people who worked in Oldenburg ==
- Horst Janssen, * November 14, 1929 Hamburg, † August 31, 1995 Oldenburg, artist, lived in Oldenburg
