= Prüfstand VII =

- Directed by: Robert Bramkamp
- Written by: Robert Bramkamp
- Based on: Gravity's Rainbow by Thomas Pynchon
- Produced by: Robert Bramkamp
- Starring: Inga Busch; Peter Lohmeyer; Robert Forster
- Cinematography: Robert Bramkamp
- Edited by: Anja Neraal
- Music by: Max Knoth
- Production companies: Next Film; VCC Perfect Pictures
- Release date: 27 October 2001 (Hof International Film Festival)
- Running time: 112 minutes
- Country: Germany
- Language: German

Prüfstand VII is a 2001 German docudrama film written and directed by Robert Bramkamp, about the V-2 rocket and the rocket research in the Peenemünde Army Research Center. The film deals with the history of ideas surrounding rocket research and the conquest of space, with Bianca as the spirit of the rocket guiding the viewer around different aspects of rocket research. It is partly inspired by Thomas Pynchon's 1973 novel Gravity's Rainbow and features dramatization of selected scenes from the novel.

== Cast ==
- Hanjo Berressem as Dr. Spectro
- Inga Busch as Bianca
- Jeff Caster as Pointsman
- Robert Forster as Ferryman
- Matthias Fuchs as General Dornberger
- Stefan Heidenreich
- Helmut Höge as Journalist
- Friedrich Kittler as Ghost
- Peter Lohmeyer as Wernher von Braun
- Mario Mentrup as Minute Man
- Michael Röhrenbach
