= Tatjana Blacher =

German actress

- Born: 18 May 1956 (age 70); West Berlin, West Germany
- Occupation: actress
- Years active: 1979–present

Tatjana Blacher (born 18 May 1956 in Berlin) is a German actress. She is the daughter of composer Boris Blacher and pianist Gerty Blacher-Herzog. Blacher studied at the Max Reinhardt seminar and at the Lee Strasberg Theatre and Film Institute. She is mostly known for her role as Edith Frank in Anne Frank: The Whole Story. She has been on many TV shows and has a son named Josh. She is multi-talented. She has had professional training in singing and dancing. She comes from Berlin, Germany and speaks fluent English as well as her native German. She had started her career in 1997 in her debut film called Reise in die Dunkelheit.

== Selected filmography ==
- Reise in die Dunkelheit (1997), as Nina Vorbeck
- Chill Out (1999), as Anna
- Bonhoeffer: Agent of Grace (2000)
- Anne Frank: The Whole Story (2001), as Edith Frank
- Unser Pappa (2001), as Bärbel
- An Unusual Affair (2002), as Ina Wenzel
- Der letzte Tanz (2006), as Ingrid Walling
- Fast Souls (2006)
- Dr. Hope (2009), as Ellen Bridges
