= Jeff Caster =

American film and television actor

- Born: August 11, 1958; Kansas City, Missouri, United States
- Died: January 3, 2016 (aged 57)
- Occupation: actor
- Spouse: Kathleen Caster
- Website: http://www.jeffcaster.com/

Jeff Caster (11 August 1958 – 3 January 2016) was an American film and television actor. He had appeared in many films and television series in both Europe and Australia. His film appearances included in Running Scared (2006), and his noteworthy TV appearances are in Frank Herbert's Dune (2000), Anne Frank: The Whole Story (2001) and Death Row (2001).

Caster had lived in Germany since 1995. He had founded two actors groups in Germany: The Re-Actors Studio, and Hamburg's English Alternative Theater (H.E.A.T.). He was the son of John and Marjorie Caster. He was married to Kathleen Caster and they had two children. He died on 3 January 2025 in KU Med Center.

== Filmography ==
Year	Title	Role	Notes
1998	Terror in the Mall	Truckdriver	TV movie, Uncredited
2000	Frank Herbert's Dune	Linger Bewt	1 episode
2001	Death Row	Gefängnisdirektor / Warden	TV movie
2001	Anne Frank: The Whole Story	Lammert Hartog	TV Mini-Series
2001	Investigating Sex	Carpenter #2	
2001	Prufstand VII	Pointsman	Docudrama
2002	Joe and Max	Businessman at Dempsey's	TV movie
2003	In Search of an Impotent Man	Kunde	
2003	Luther	Matthew	
2005	Die Hitlerkantate	Amerikanischer Produzent	
2006	Running Scared	chef	
2009	Shut	Mike Finn	
2011	The Ultimate SuperHero Blog	Captain Impact	
2012	Kunduz: The Incident at Hadji Ghafur	Miller	(final film role)
