= Nicholas Audsley =

English actor

- Born: Nicholas Robert Audsley; 6 February 1982 (age 44); Hammersmith, London, England
- Occupation: Actor
- Years active: 2001-present

Nicholas Robert Audsley (born 6 February 1982) is an English actor, best known for his portrayal of Peter van Pels in Anne Frank: The Whole Story.

Audsley is the oldest of three siblings. He has a younger brother, Charlie, and a younger sister, India. He attended Eltham College, where he appeared in seven plays.

== Acting career ==
Audsley has appeared in a number of BBC and ITV television series, including The Cazalets, Midsomer Murders ("Murder on St. Malley's Day"), Silent Witness and Foyle's War ("A Lesson in Murder"). He appeared in ABC's Anne Frank: The Whole Story in which he plays the character Peter van Pels. He played Lord Strange in the 2017 series The White Princess and Charles, Duke of Monmouth in the third season of Victoria (2019).

== Filmography ==
=== Film ===
Year	Title	Role	Notes
2003	Standing Room Only	Larry's son	Short film
2007	Mood Swing	Michael	Short film

=== Television ===
Year	Title	Role	Notes
2000	All the Way	Lowell	
2001	Anne Frank: The Whole Story	Peter van Pels	Credited as Nick Audsley
2001	The Cazalets	Christopher Castle	4 episodes
2002	Midsomer Murders	Marcus Heywood	Episode: "Murder on St Malley's Day"
2002	Silent Witness	Alex Dyer	2 episodes
2002	Foyle's War	David Beale	Episode: "A Lesson in Murder"
2014	Raiders of the Lost Art	Guillaume Apollinaire	Episode: "Leonardo and the Mona Lisa"
2017	The White Princess	Lord Strange	
2019	Victoria	Duke Charles of Monmouth	Series 3
2020	Washington	Thomas Jefferson	Episode: "Father of His Country"
2022	Father Brown	Robert, Earl of Finchmore	Episode: "The Red Death"
