= Anne Frank: The Whole Story =

Television miniseries

- Promotional television miniseries poster
- Genre: Biographical war drama
- Based on: Anne Frank: The Biography by Melissa Müller
- Screenplay by: Kirk Ellis
- Directed by: Robert Dornhelm
- Starring: Ben Kingsley; Brenda Blethyn; Lili Taylor; Hannah Taylor-Gordon; Tatjana Blacher; Joachim Król; Jessica Manley; Nicholas Audsley; Jan Niklas
- Theme music composer: Graeme Revell
- Countries of origin: United Kingdom; Czech Republic; United States
- Original languages: English; German; French; Spanish; Italian; Dutch; Hebrew
- No. of episodes: 2

Production
- Executive producers: Tomas Krejci; Hans Proppe
- Producer: David R. Kappes
- Production location: Prague, Czech Republic
- Cinematography: Elemér Ragályi
- Editor: Christopher Rouse
- Running time: 190 minutes
- Production companies: Milk & Honey Pictures; Dorothy Pictures; Touchstone Television

Original release
- Network: ABC
- Release: May 20 – May 21, 2001

Anne Frank: The Whole Story is a 2001 two-part biographical war drama television miniseries based on the 1998 book Anne Frank: The Biography by Melissa Müller. The television miniseries aired on ABC on May 20 and 21, 2001. It aired in the United Kingdom in late 2001 on Channel Four. The television miniseries starred Ben Kingsley, Brenda Blethyn, Hannah Taylor-Gordon and Lili Taylor. Controversially, but in keeping with the claim made by Melissa Müller, the television miniseries asserts that the anonymous betrayer of the Frank family was the office cleaner, when in fact the betrayer's identity has not been definitively established. A disagreement between the producers of the television miniseries and the Anne Frank Foundation about the validity of this and other details led to the withdrawal of their endorsement of the dramatization, which prevented the use of any quotations from the writings of Anne Frank appearing within the television miniseries. Both Kingsley and Taylor-Gordon received Golden Globe and Emmy Award nominations for their performances as Otto Frank and Anne Frank, respectively.

== Plot overview ==
In 1939, Anne Frank (Hannah Taylor-Gordon) realizes her world is beginning to change around her. Eventually, the Nazis invade the Netherlands. Anne becomes increasingly distressed as her rights are taken away, and her family is ominously being forced to register as Jews with the government and to wear yellow stars. She is then forced to leave her school and attend a Jewish lyceum, where she meets her new best friend, Jacqueline van Maarsen (Victoria Anne Brown), who is only half-Jewish. Anne also meets Hello Silberberg (Nicky Cantor), on whom she develops a crush; it is implied that Hello also reciprocates her feelings. On her 13th birthday, she receives the famous checkered-patterned diary and immediately goes to her room to write her first entry.

A few weeks later, on a normal Sunday in July 1942, Margot (Jessica Manley), Anne's sister, receives a call-up from the Germans to be deported to a "labor camp" in the East. Otto Frank (Ben Kingsley) moves his family into the now-renowned "Secret Annex", followed soon by Hermann and Auguste van Pels (Joachim Krol and Brenda Blethyn), their son Peter (Nicholas Audsley), and Fritz Pfeffer (Jan Niklas), the Frank family's dentist. During their stay in the annex, the Van Pels family members are noted for their constant bickering. Fritz becomes Anne's antagonist, and Anne has her first serious relationship with Peter, from whom she receives her first kiss. All the while, she wishes for an end to the war. Anne also gets her first period while in the annex - an occasion that she had been anxiously awaiting. One night a thief breaks into the building below the annex, leaving the eight refugees in terror.

Eventually, on August 4, 1944, the Franks are denounced by Lena Hartog (Veronica Nowag-Jones), the cleaning lady of the business in which the annex resides. The eight people in the hiding are arrested and Anne's diary is dumped onto the floor while SS man Karl Silberbauer (Holger Daemgen) searches for hoarded money. Two of the helpers (of those in the Secret Annex) are also arrested. In conversation with Otto, Silberbauer is stunned to learn that he served as an officer in the Imperial German Army during World War I. Silberbauer laments that, if they had not gone into hiding, Otto and his family would have received decent treatment.

Afterwards, the Franks are sent on a train to Westerbork, a transit camp, where Anne, her family and friends are held in the criminal "S Barracks". There, Anne meets a woman, Janny Brandes-Brilleslijper (Klára Issová) and her sister Lientje (Zdeňka Volencová), who are later seen with Anne in Bergen-Belsen. Anne also befriends the camp's schoolteacher (Jaroslava Siktancova), who often invites Anne to the camp school to tell the students stories. (One of them is Mrs. Quackenbush, a story that Anne had written before going into hiding, and had been assigned to write by her math teacher as punishment for repeatedly talking in class)

Anne and her family are soon transported to Auschwitz, where the women are stripped of their clothing and their hair is shorn. She is separated from her father and the other men. During a selection for women in the camp to go to a safer place to work in a munitions factory, Anne's mother and sister are chosen, but Anne is not. Therefore, Edith and Margot choose to remain behind. Anne and Margot are sent to a scabies barracks and later deported to Bergen-Belsen, which is no more than many large tents on a muddy ground surrounded by an electric fence. Mrs. Van Pels eventually arrives at the camp to find Anne very thin and Margot sick with typhus. One night Anne sees her old friend, Hannah (Jade Williams), through the fence. Hannah is a privileged prisoner and tells Anne that her father is dying but her sister is alive. She throws a package with bread and socks over to Anne.

In the last scene with Anne, a fevered Margot and Anne speak of the days before they went to Bergen-Belsen. They go to sleep. The next morning, Anne opens her eyes, and hears birds outside. She nudges Margot to show her, but Margot doesn't wake up, and instead falls out of bed onto the ground. Anne realizes that Margot is dead, and lifts her eyes to the sky in defeat.

After the war in 1945, it is revealed that Otto is, in fact, alive. He looks for information about his daughters, but has no luck in doing so until he is directed to find Janny Brandes, who survived the camp. Otto is told that Anne died a few days after Margot. Miep Gies (Lili Taylor), who helped the Franks hide, gives Anne's preserved diary to Otto. Otto reads it all. He then goes up to the now empty annex and photos. He collapses in a crying heap in front of Anne's wall, which is still plastered with movie stars. An epilogue is then shown which describes what happened to everyone mentioned in the story.

== Cast ==
- Hannah Taylor-Gordon as Anne Frank
- Jessica Manley as Margot Frank
- Tatjana Blacher as Edith Frank
- Ben Kingsley as Otto Frank
- Joachim Król as Hermann van Pels
- Brenda Blethyn as Auguste van Pels
- Nicholas Audsley as Peter van Pels
- Jan Niklas as Fritz Pfeffer
- Branka Katic as Charlotte Kaletta
- Lili Taylor as Miep Gies
- Rob Das as Jan Gies
- Peter Bolhuis as Victor Kugler
- Johannes Silberschneider as Johannes Kleiman
- Ela Lehotska (acting) and Suzanne Friedline (voice) as Bep Voskuijl
- Jade Williams as Hannah Goslar
- Dominique Horwitz as Hans Goslar
- Victoria Anne Brown as Jacqueline van Maarsen
- Cees Geel as Wilhelm van Maaren
- Jeff Caster as Lammert Hartog
- Klára Issová as Janny Brandes-Brilleslijper
- Robert Russell as Mr. Keesing
- Michaela Horakova as Susanne "Sanne" Ledermann
- Holger Daemgen as Karl Silberbauer

== Reception ==
Anne Frank: The Whole Story earned critical acclaim from critics and viewers. The New York Post called the television miniseries "undeniably powerful".

=== Awards and nominations ===
Year	Award	Category	Nominee(s)	Result	Ref.
2001	Artios Awards	Best Casting for Mini-Series	Meg Liberman and Cami Patton	Nominated	
2001	Online Film & Television Association Awards	Best Miniseries		Won	
2001	Online Film & Television Association Awards	Best Actor in a Motion Picture or Miniseries	Ben Kingsley	Won	
2001	Online Film & Television Association Awards	Best Actress in a Motion Picture or Miniseries	Hannah Taylor-Gordon	Nominated	
2001	Online Film & Television Association Awards	Best Supporting Actress in a Motion Picture or Miniseries	Brenda Blethyn	Won	
2001	Online Film & Television Association Awards	Best Direction of a Motion Picture or Miniseries		Won	
2001	Online Film & Television Association Awards	Best Writing of a Motion Picture or Miniseries		Nominated	
2001	Online Film & Television Association Awards	Best Ensemble in a Motion Picture or Miniseries		Won	
2001	Online Film & Television Association Awards	Best Costume Design in a Motion Picture or Miniseries		Nominated	
2001	Online Film & Television Association Awards	Best Editing in a Motion Picture or Miniseries		Won	
2001	Online Film & Television Association Awards	Best Lighting in a Motion Picture or Miniseries		Won	
2001	Online Film & Television Association Awards	Best Makeup/Hairstyling in a Motion Picture or Miniseries		Nominated	
2001	Online Film & Television Association Awards	Best Music in a Motion Picture or Miniseries		Won	
2001	Online Film & Television Association Awards	Best New Theme Song in a Motion Picture or Miniseries		Nominated	
2001	Online Film & Television Association Awards	Best New Titles Sequence in a Motion Picture or Miniseries		Won	
2001	Online Film & Television Association Awards	Best Production Design in a Motion Picture or Miniseries		Nominated	
2001	Online Film & Television Association Awards	Best Sound in a Motion Picture or Miniseries		Nominated	
2001	Online Film & Television Association Awards	Best Visual Effects in a Motion Picture or Miniseries		Nominated	
2001	Peabody Awards		Touchstone Television	Won	
2001	Primetime Emmy Awards	Outstanding Miniseries	Hans Proppe and David Kappes	Won	
2001	Primetime Emmy Awards	Outstanding Lead Actor in a Miniseries or a Movie	Ben Kingsley	Nominated	
2001	Primetime Emmy Awards	Outstanding Lead Actress in a Miniseries or a Movie	Hannah Taylor Gordon	Nominated	
2001	Primetime Emmy Awards	Outstanding Supporting Actress in a Miniseries or a Movie	Brenda Blethyn	Nominated	
2001	Primetime Emmy Awards	Outstanding Directing for a Miniseries or a Movie	Robert Dornhelm	Nominated	
2001	Primetime Emmy Awards	Outstanding Writing for a Miniseries or a Movie	Kirk Ellis	Nominated	
2001	Primetime Emmy Awards	Outstanding Art Direction for a Miniseries, Movie or a Special	Ondrej Nekvasil, Jan Vlasak, and Marie Raskova (for "Part 2")	Won	
2001	Primetime Emmy Awards	Outstanding Casting for a Miniseries, Movie or a Special	Meg Liberman, Cami Patton, Angela Terry, Suzanne Smith, Risa Kes, Job Gosschalk, and Nancy Bishop	Nominated	
2001	Primetime Emmy Awards	Outstanding Cinematography for a Miniseries or a Movie	Elemér Ragályi (for "Part 2")	Nominated	
2001	Primetime Emmy Awards	Outstanding Single-Camera Picture Editing for a Miniseries, Movie or a Special	Christopher Rouse	Nominated	
2001	Primetime Emmy Awards	Outstanding Sound Editing for a Miniseries, Movie or a Special	John Benson, Walter Michael Bost, Michael Babcock, Erik Aadahl, Andrew Ellerd, Jeff Sawyer, David Beadle, Sonya Lindsay, Helen Luttrell, Ralph Osborn, Patrick Hogan, Gretchen Thoma, and Timothy Pearson	Nominated	
2001	Television Critics Association Awards	Outstanding Achievement in Movies, Miniseries and Specials		Nominated	
2002	American Film Institute Awards	TV Movie or Mini-Series or the Year		Nominated	
2002	American Film Institute Awards	Actor of the Year – Male – TV Movie or Mini-Series	Ben Kingsley	Nominated	
2002	American Film Institute Awards	Actor of the Year – Female – TV Movie or Mini-Series	Hannah Taylor Gordon	Nominated	
2002	Cinema Audio Society Awards	Outstanding Achievement in Sound Mixing for Television – Movies of the Week and Mini-Series	Michal Holubec, Terry O'Bright, and Tom E. Dahl (for "Part 1")	Nominated	
2002	Golden Globe Awards	Best Miniseries or Motion Picture Made for Television		Nominated	
2002	Golden Globe Awards	Best Actor in a Miniseries or Motion Picture Made for Television	Ben Kingsley	Nominated	
2002	Golden Globe Awards	Best Actress in a Miniseries or Motion Picture Made for Television	Hannah Taylor Gordon	Nominated	
2002	Humanitas Prize	90 Minute or Longer Network or Syndicated Television	Kirk Ellis	Won	
2002	Producers Guild of America Awards	David L. Wolper Award for Outstanding Producer of Long-Form Television		Nominated	
2002	Satellite Awards	Best Miniseries		Nominated	
2002	Satellite Awards	Best Actor in a Miniseries or a Motion Picture Made for Television	Ben Kingsley	Nominated	
2002	Satellite Awards	Best Actress in a Miniseries or a Motion Picture Made for Television	Hannah Taylor Gordon	Nominated	
2002	Satellite Awards	Best Actress in a Supporting Role in a Miniseries or a Motion Picture Made for Television	Brenda Blethyn	Nominated	
2002	Screen Actors Guild Awards	Outstanding Performance by a Male Actor in a Miniseries or Television Movie	Ben Kingsley	Won	
2002	Writers Guild of America Awards	Long Form – Adapted	Kirk Ellis; Based on the book Anne Frank: The Biography by Melissa Müller	Won	

== Home media ==
Anne Frank: The Whole Story was released on VHS and DVD on August 28, 2001, by Buena Vista Home Entertainment. The only difference between the DVD and VHS version of this television miniseries is the trailer of South Pacific on the DVD.

== See also ==
- List of Holocaust films
- List of films about Anne Frank
- List of television films produced for American Broadcasting Company
