= Andrea Clausen =

German actress (born 1959)

- Born: 17 January 1959 (age 67); Oldenburg, West Germany (now Germany)

Andrea Clausen (born 17 January 1959) is a German stage actress and a member of the Burgtheater ensemble.

== Life and theatre career ==
Born in Oldenburg, Clausen first studied at the acting school of Étienne Decroux in Paris and then at the Folkwang University of the Arts in Essen. After her studies she made her debut as an actress in Oldenburg and in Cologne. In 1986 she moved to Bochum and began to work with Andrea Breth. In 1991 she went to the Burgtheater and worked as well with Claus Peymann, Hans Neuenfels and Wilfried Minks. In 1994, she went to the Schaubühne Berlin, returning two years later to Vienna.

She received a Kainz-Medaille for her acting in Who's Afraid of Virginia Woolf?.

Since 1996 she has worked with Matthias Hartmann, Luc Bondy, Karin Henkel, Paulus Manker, Theu Boermans and in many plays directed by Andrea Breth, such as The Cherry Orchard, Emilia Galotti, Minna von Barnhelm, Don Carlos and Motortown. One of her more famous roles was as Ines Finidori in Trois versions de la vie of Yasmina Reza (2000), which was first played in Vienna, at the Akademietheater.

Andrea Clausen is married, and in 2003 she had twin daughters named Marie and Jelena.

Since 2006 a large photography of Andrea Clausen, made by the Austrian photograph Ilse Haider, has been hanging in the Portrait Gallery of the Burgtheater.

== Theatre roles ==
=== Schauspielhaus Bochum ===
- Angelina in Sud (Julien Green; D: A. Breth)
- Girl in Summer (Edward Bond; D: A. Breth)
- Minna in Minna von Barnhelm (Lessing, D: U. Troller)
- Lucile in Dantons Tod (Büchner; D: F. P.Steckel)
- Olivia in Twelfth Night, or What You Will (Shakespeare, D: A. Breth)

=== Schaubühne am Lehniner Platz, Berlin ===
- Elektra in Elektra (Euripides, D: A. Breth)

=== Burgtheater and Akademietheater, Vienna ===
- Marie in Clavigo (Goethe, D: C. Peymann)
- Eve in Der zerbrochne Krug (Kleist, D: A. Breth)
- Honey in Who's Afraid of Virginia Woolf? (Edward Albee; D: H. Neuenfels)
- Julie in Liliom (Molnár; D: P. Manker)
- Nora in A Doll's House (Ibsen; D: K. Henkel)
- Isabella in Edward II (C. Marlowe; D: C. Peymann)
- Irene in Tochter der Luft (Hans Magnus Enzensberger/Calderón de la Barca, D: Frank Castorf
- Ramona in Viridiana of Luis Buñuel (D: Dimiter Gotscheff)
- Ines in Drei Mal Leben (Reza; D: L. Bondy), Akademietheater
- Countess Orsina in Emilia Galotti (Lessing; D: A. Breth)
- Marchioness Mondecar in Don Carlos (Schiller, D: A. Breth) 2004
- Ranevskaya in The Cherry Orchard (Chekhov; D: A. Breth) 2005
- A Mourning women in Minna von Barnhelm (Lessing, D: A. Breth) 2005
- Hippolyta and Titania in A Midsummer Night's Dream (Shakespeare, R: Theu Boermans) 2007
- Helen in Motortown (Simon Stephens, D: A. Breth) 2008

== Movies ==
- 2003: Brüder (Brothers), D: W Murnberger/ORF
- 1994: Kopf des Mohren (The Moor's Head), D: Paulus Manker
- 1983: Fremdes Land (Strange Country) D: Claus Peter Witt

== Audio ==
- Speaker in the audio book Geboren in Bagdad Susanne Ayoub 2004, Hoffman und Campe Verlag (ISBN 978-3-455-30377-3)
- Speaker (Clelia) in the audio-drama Unter Frauen (Tra donne sole) of Cesare Pavese, 2006 (D: Götz Fritsch, ORF)

== Awards ==
- 1987: Best young actress (theatre-magazine Theater heute)
- 1992: Kainz-Medaille
- 2001, 2003 and 2005: nominated for the Nestroy Theatre Prize in the category Best Actress
- 2007: ORF-Audio-Award (ORF-Hörspielpreis) Actress of the Year 2006
