= Jessica Manley =

British actress (born 1985)

- Born: Jessica Rachel Manley; August 1985 (age 41)
- Education: Guildhall School of Music and Drama

Jessica Rachel Manley (born August 1985) is an English actress. She began her career as a child actress. She is mostly known for playing Margot Frank in the ABC miniseries Anne Frank: The Whole Story (2001).

== Life and career ==
Manley grew up in West Yorkshire. She is the daughter of Andrew Manley, a stage director who served as director of the Harrogate Theatre when she was a child, and Jennifer Granville. Her grandparents, who were Jewish, emigrated to Britain just a few years before the Second World War. Manley attended Kirkby Overblow School in Kirkby Overblow.

Manley made her acting debut at the age of five alongside her older siblings Sam and Miriam in a 1990 pantomime. She is best known for playing Margot Frank, sister of Anne Frank, in the TV film Anne Frank: The Whole Story (2001). She studied classical acting and graduated from the Guildhall School of Music and Drama in 2006. She most recently has been developing site-specific pieces for Listed Theatre.

== Select filmography ==
- Anne Frank: The Whole Story (2001) (TV)- Margot Frank
- Veils (2007) (short film)- Miriam
- Lewis (2009) (TV series)- Jo (1 episode)
- The Wolfman (2010)- Gypsy mother
- Exploitation (2011) (short film)- The Drunk
