= Anne Frank: The Biography =

Book by Melissa Müller

- Author: Melissa Müller
- Original title: Das Mädchen Anne Franke
- Language: German
- Genre: Biography
- Publisher: Paul List, Henry Holt
- Publication date: 1998
- Publication place: Germany
- English publication date: 1999
- Media type: Paperback; Hardback
- Pages: 330 pp (paperback)
- ISBN: 0-8050-5997-0
- OCLC: 42369449
- Dewey Decimal: 940.53/18/092 B 21
- LC Class: DS135.N6 F7349713 1999

Anne Frank: The Biography is the first full biography of Holocaust diarist Anne Frank. Written by Melissa Müller, it was initially published in 1998 in Germany. The book was the basis for the mini-series Anne Frank: The Whole Story (2001).

== Summary ==
Anne Frank was born on 12 June 1929 to a lower- or middle-class Jewish family in Frankfurt, Germany. They feel the early threats of Nazism as Hitler rises to power in 1933. Soon her family emigrates to the Netherlands, where Anne enjoys an idyllic life centred on school, socializing, boys and sleepovers. However, the situation changes quickly once Germany invades the Netherlands in May 1940. The family is forced to go into hiding with another family at the back building of the family business. Anne faithfully keeps a diary describing everyday situations and her thoughts and beliefs. After two years and one month, they are betrayed by unknown parties and sent to concentration camps, where they all die, with the exception of Anne's father, Otto Frank. The book ends with an afterword by one of the women who hid them, Otto Frank's secretary Miep Gies.

== See also ==
- The Diary of Anne Frank
