= Renate Aichinger =

Austrian playwright and theatre director

Renate Aichinger (born 28 November 1976 in Salzburg) is an Austrian playwright and theatre director. She studied theatre, film and media studies at the University of Vienna whilst working for various small theatres in Vienna and subsequently also for larger theatres in Switzerland, Germany and Austria including Junges Schauspielhaus Zürich, Stadttheater Gießen and Vorarlberger Landestheater. Since 2009, she has been working at the Junge Burg Wien. Since the season of 2012/13, she has also directed the Bürgertheater of the Landestheater Niederösterreich (State Theatre of Lower Austria). Two of her plays have been nominated for the Retzhofer Dramapreis: "WWW.COM" (2003) and "Rosa Rossi sucht das Morgen" (2011).
