= Melissa Müller =

Austrian journalist and author (born 1967)

- Born: 1967 (age 58–59); Vienna, Austria
- Occupations: Writer, journalist
- Writing career
- Subject: Biography

Melissa Müller (born 1967 in Vienna, Austria) is an Austrian journalist and author.

She is the author of Anne Frank: The Biography, which draws on historical documents and personal interviews with those who knew Anne Frank to provide a fuller picture of Frank's life than the diary permits. Kirkus Reviews wrote about the enlarged reedition of the book in 2013: Melissa Müller "illuminates the shadows of Anne’s diary, particularly in casting the Franks’ loveless arranged marriage, which Anne accurately saw through, in a sympathetic and understanding light. She adds dimension to Anne's picture of Edith, as well; the woman her daughter depicted as stern and cold was also trying desperately not to give in to despair."

She is also the editor of Traudl Junge's "Until The Final Hour: Hitler's Last Secretary". The book inspired the 2002 film documentary Im Toten Winkel (Blind Spot — Hitler's Secretary) by André Heller and Othmar Schmiderer; Melissa Müller introduced André Heller to Traudl Junge.

In 2008, together with Monika Tatzkow, Melissa Müller published Verlorene Bilder, verlorene Leben. The book tells the story of Jewish art collectors, and how they were treated after 1945. The English edition Lost Lives, Lost Art: Jewish Collectors, Nazi Art Theft and the Quest for Justice was published in 2010.

== Books ==
- Melissa Müller: Anne Frank: The Biography. Metropolitan Books, Henry Holt and Company, New York, revised edition 2013 (original edition: 1998), 459 pages, ISBN 978-0-8050-8731-4.
- Melissa Müller, Melissa Müller: Lost Lives, Lost Art: Jewish Collectors, Nazi Art Theft, and the Quest for Justice, Vendome Press, 2010, 248 pages, ISBN 978-0865652637.
- Melissa Müller together with Monika Tatzkow: Verlorene Bilder, verlorene Leben – Jüdische Sammler und was aus ihren Kunstwerken wurde. Elisabeth-Sandmann, München 2008, ISBN 978-3-938045-30-5.
- Melissa Müller together with Traudl Junge: Until the Final Hour: Hitler's Last Secretary, Arcade Publishing, 2004. ISBN 978-1-55970-728-2.
- Melissa Müller together with Traudl Junge: Bis zur letzten Stunde. Hitlers Sekretärin erzählt ihr Leben. Claassen, München 2002, ISBN 3-546-00311-X.
- Melissa Müller together with Monika Czernin: Picassos Friseur. Kiepenheuer und Witsch, Köln 2001, ISBN 3-462-02980-0.
- Melissa Müller: Die kleinen Könige der Warenwelt. Kinder im Visier der Werbung. Campus, Frankfurt am Main 1997, ISBN 3-593-35679-1.

== Films: screenplay and consultant ==
- 2014: ORF TV-Series Universum History — Diplomatische Liebschaften — Die Mätressen des Wiener Kongresses (concept and screenplay, together with Monika Czernin)
- 2010: Der Traum vom Gelobten Land — Theodor Herzl und das moderne Israel (concept and screenplay, together with Monika Czernin)
- 2005: Hitler und der Adel (concept and screenplay, together with Monika Czernin)
- 2004: Downfall (German: Der Untergang), nominated for Best International Feature Film (formerly: Best Foreign Language Film) at the 77th Academy Awards (role of consultant to director Oliver Hirschbiegel and producer/scriptwriter Bernd Eichinger)
- 2001: Anne Frank: The Whole Story, two-part mini-series based on Melissa Müller's book Anne Frank: The Biography (role of consultant)
