= Lili Grün =

Austrian writer and actress (1904-1942)

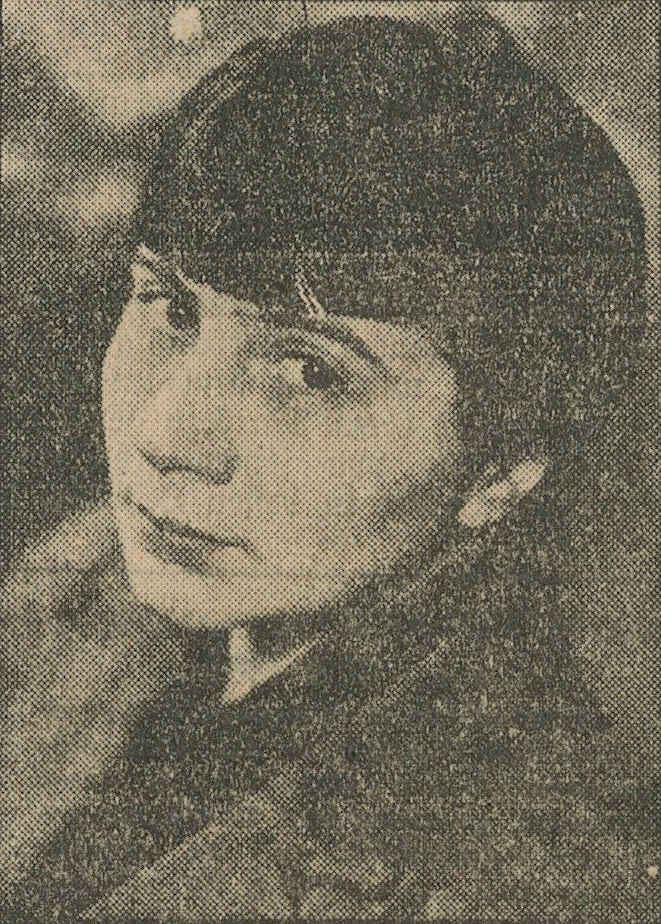
Lili Grün in 1936

Lili Grün (1904 – 1942) was an Austrian writer and actress. Her debut novel Herz über Bord (2013) was enthusiastically received by critics. In it, she processes her experiences in the Berlin cabaret Die Brücke. Grün wrote two other novels, which are also contemporary novels of the New Objectivity. She also published poems and short stories in newspapers and magazines. Her autobiographically influenced texts deal with the loneliness of the female main characters, love and the tense relationship between the sexes, and the difficulties that young emancipated women have in finding a place in society. Grün's literary work came to an abrupt end as a result of the disenfranchisement and persecution of Jews during the Nazi Germany. In 2007, German studies scholar Anke Heimberg came across the novel Herz über Bord and began researching the writer's life and work, and her texts were published in the following years by AvivA Verlag in Berlin.

== Life ==
=== Childhood, youth, education ===
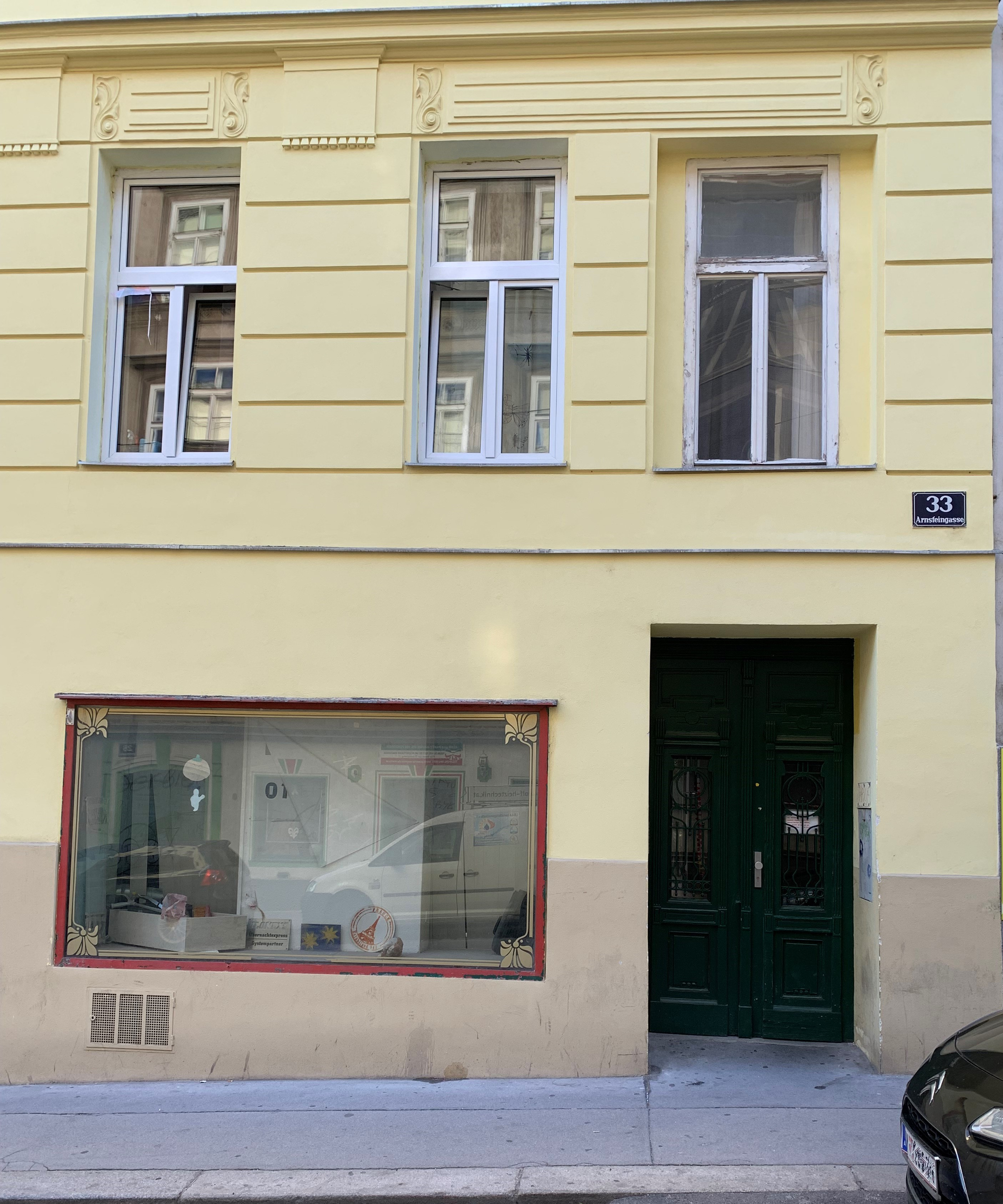
Arnsteingasse 33, house entrance and shop window (2022)

Lili Grün was born on 3 February 1904 as Elisabeth Grün in Vienna, Austria-Hungary. She was the youngest child of Ármin Grün, a Hungarian merchant from Élesd, and his wife Regina Grün, née Goldstein. Her three siblings were Frieda (1890), Karl (1894) and Grete (1896). The family lived from 1909 at Arnsteingasse 33 in Reindorf, part of what is now Vienna's 15th district Rudolfsheim-Fünfhaus. The father was a moustache bandage manufacturer and sold perfumery and hairdressing supplies in a store on the first floor of the apartment building.

At the beginning of August 1915, Regina Grün died unexpectedly of a cerebral stroke at the age of 47, which for the eleven-year-old Lili probably meant "the end of her until then very sheltered childhood." In January 1922, her father succumbed to a chronic kidney disease at the age of 56. Thus Grün became an orphan before her 18th birthday. Who took over the guardianship is unknown. After graduating from Volksschule and public school in 1918, she trained as a clerk.

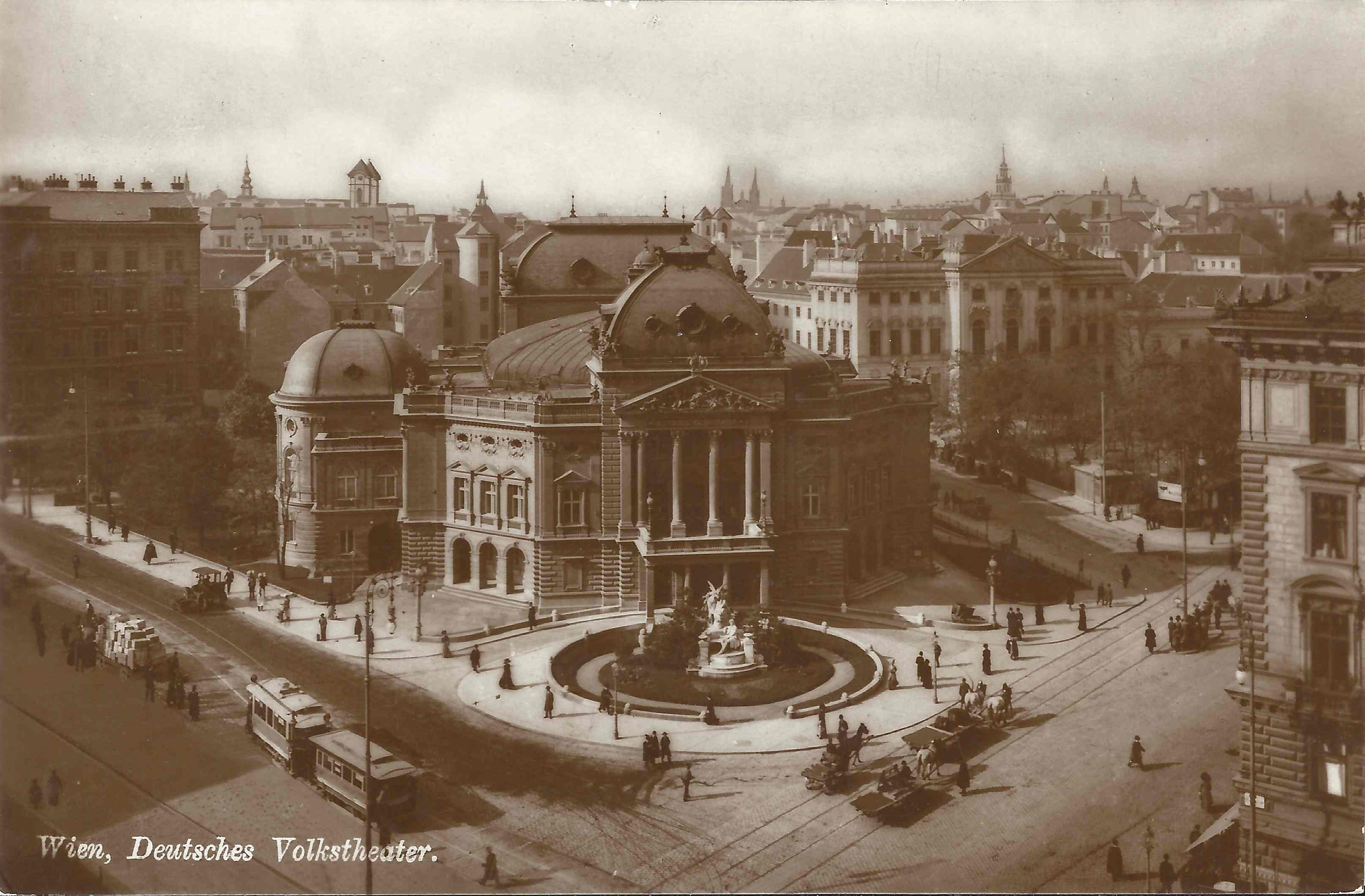
German People's Theater (before 1928)

In the summer of 1921, Grün gave "Theaterelevin" as her occupation on her Vienna registration form, indicating that she was taking private acting lessons. From 1920 to 1924, she appeared on stage at the Volkstheater in all 60 performances of Henrik Ibsen's drama Peer Gynt, playing the role of Troll. From the 1920s, she also participated in the newly founded stage of Sozialistischen Arbeiterjugend. She probably played a first leading role at a theater in the provinces.

Lili Grün's brother, Karl, had begun studying law and philosophy in Vienna, was drafted and seriously wounded in the war. Afterwards he could not finish his studies and made his way as a private teacher. On 25 March 1923, he was arrested for attempted counterfeiting. In July 1926, Grete's sister married Hellmuth Bettauer, the son of the writer Hugo Bettauer, who publicly advocated sexual education, impunity for homosexuality, and emancipation of women, and who died in 1925 as a result of an assassination attempt. Hellmuth moved in with Grete to live with Lili Grün in Arnsteingasse, continuing her father's commitment. Grün's contact with Hugo Bettauer and her youth in Red Vienna shaped her later literary work.

=== Berlin years ===
At the end of the 1920s, there was high unemployment among theater professionals in Vienna. Since under these conditions the chances of finding employment as an actress were slim, Grün left her hometown and moved to Berlin. There, however, the job opportunities were no better. Erich Kästner stated in April 1929: "One may assume without exaggeration that in a city like Berlin there are significantly more actors without engagements than those with engagements." Many artists lived under precarious conditions; the situation of actors was "characterized by inadequate nutrition, poor clothing, extremely modest living conditions, as well as illness [...]" (Anke Heimberg). The situation of actors in Berlin was not as good as in Berlin.

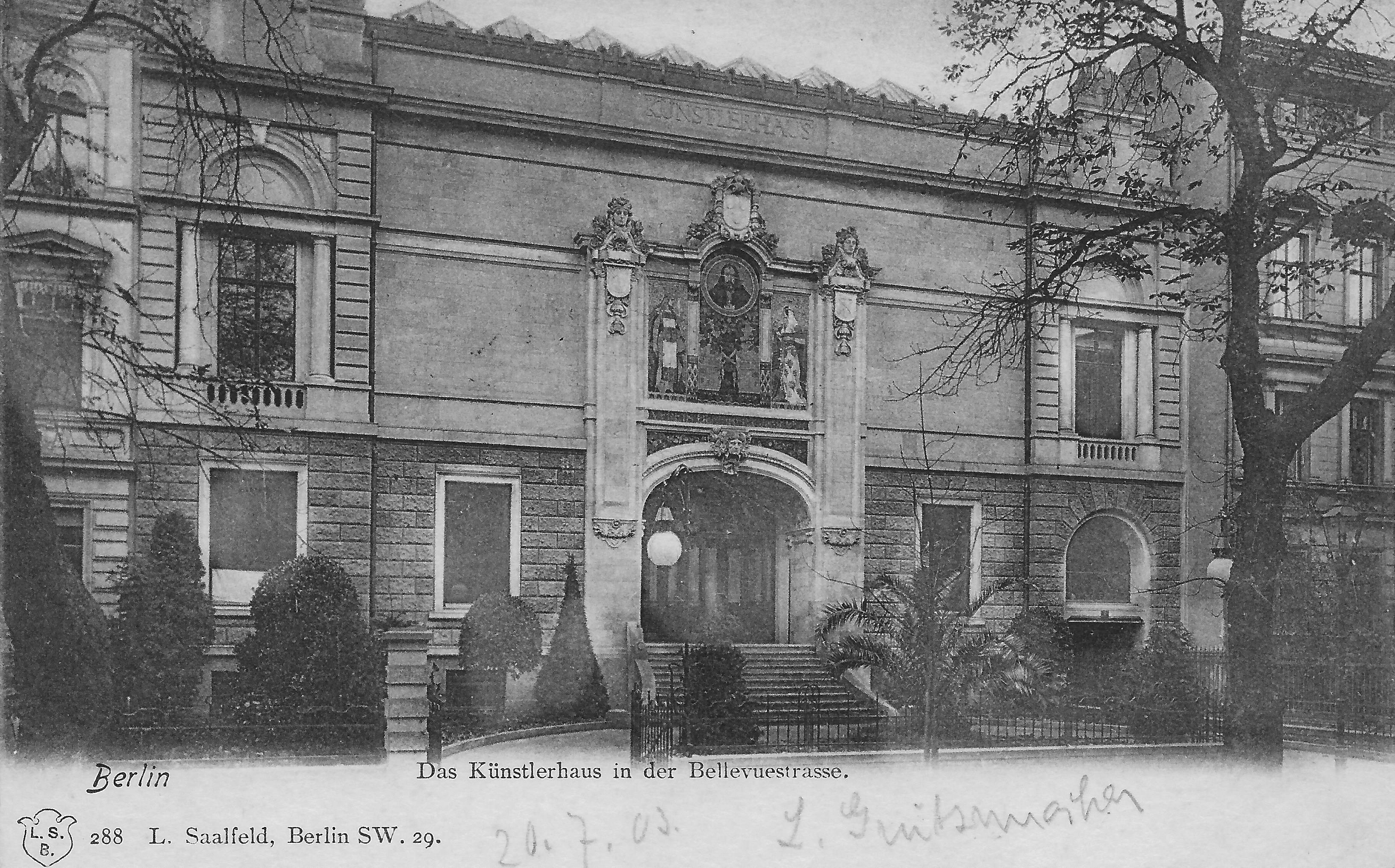
Bellevue Street Artists' House (1903)

Grün worked as a saleswoman and kitchen assistant in a café confectionery and founded the political-literary cabaret collective Die Brücke with like-minded people in the spring of 1931. In May, they premiered their own evening program in the basement of the Künstlerhaus of the Verein Berliner Künstler at Bellevuestraße 3. The artistic director of Die Brücke was Julian Arendt. The "good twenty young 'creatives'" also included Ernst Busch, Hanns Eisler, Annemarie Hase, Erik Ode, Erwin Straus, and Margarethe Voss.

From 1929 on, Grün published her own poetry and short prose in several newspapers, such as Tempo and UHU, but also in Berliner Tageblatt, Prager Tagblatt, and Wiener Tag. It is not known which texts she read in the Brücke performances. What is certain is that her performances met with a positive response: "Lily Grün brings delightfully cheeky poems," noted Das 12 Uhr Blatt on 5 May 1931, and the Vossische Zeitung on 7 May 1931, characterized Grün's texts as "witty-sentimental poems." The Berliner Film-Kurier wrote of one performance, "... carries eroticism, very personal and very amusing."

After a few weeks, the cabaret had to close because audience numbers were dwindling. The premises were only vacant anyway because the cabaret Die Katakombe, which was based there, was on a summer tour. "Communist inflammatory cabaret" was what the Deutsche Tageszeitung called the Brücke's program as early as 5 May 1931. Possibly the more politically radical orientation compared to the Katakombe contributed to the decline in audiences. Despite this failure, the years in Berlin were significant for Grün: it was here that she found writing. On the other hand, it was apparently in Berlin that she contracted tuberculosis as a result of living conditions marked by poverty and professional strain.

=== Vienna, Prague, Paris ===
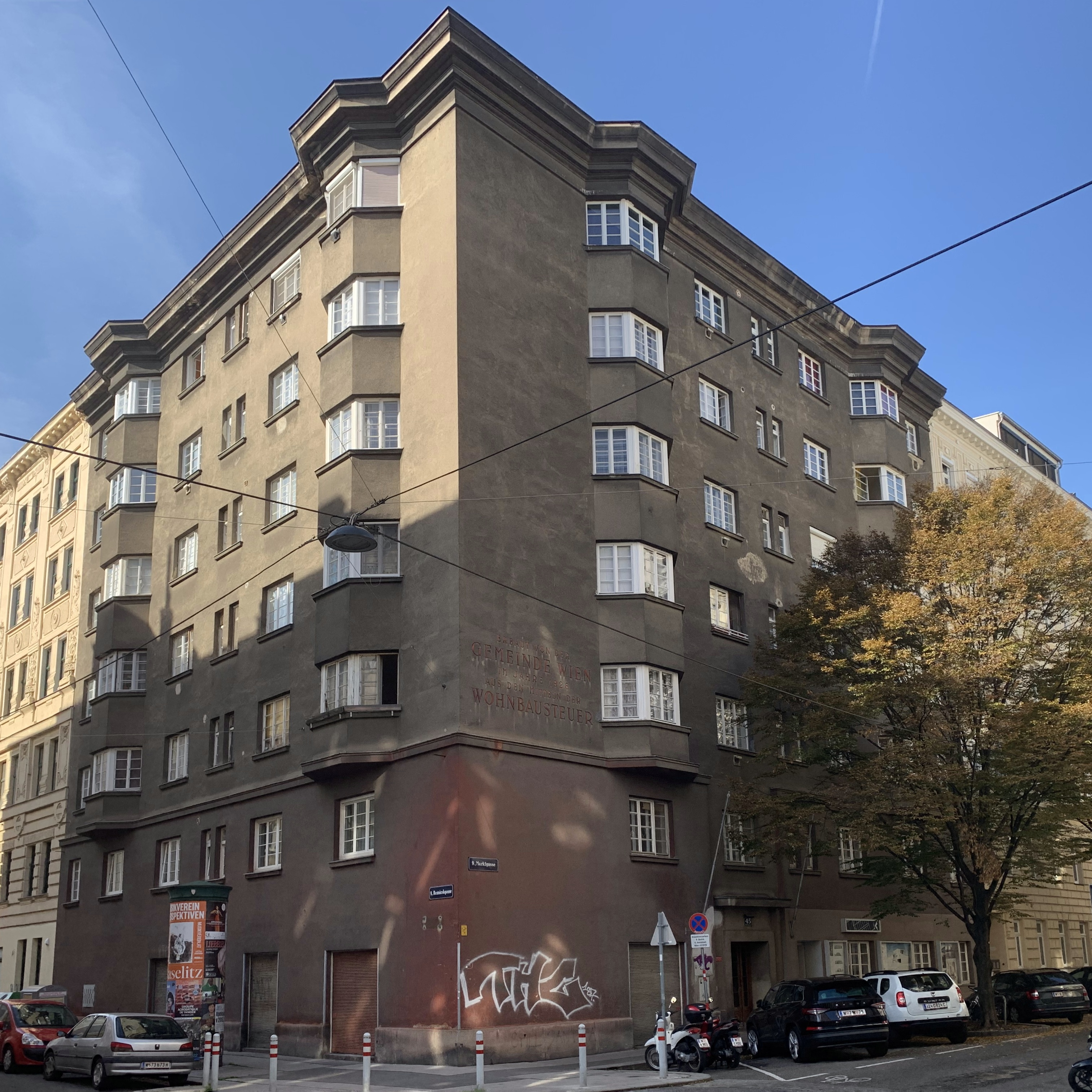
Corner building Marktgasse 45 / Reznicekgasse 5, formerly Wagnergasse (2022)

The exact time of Grün's return to Vienna is not known. One motivation was the intention to "get rid of her lung tip catarrh in a sanatorium." For the years 1932 to 1940 the place of residence is given as the Gemeindebau apartment at Marktgasse 45 in Alsergrund. In May 1932, she was awarded second best in a talent competition of the cabaret Simpl, in which 50 up-and-coming artists participated, by a jury headed by Hans Nüchtern. For the critics, Lili Grün was "a kind of female Joachim Ringelnatz."

In Vienna, she processed her experiences around Die Brücke in the novel Herz über Bord. It was published in March 1933 by Paul Zsolnay Verlag and was praised, for example, in the Neues Wiener Tagblatt as "a very noteworthy contribution to the contemporary history of the young generation." Grün was nominated for the Julius Reich Poet Prize in the same year. In the same year Grün was nominated for the Julius Reich Poet Prize.

Grün subsequently found no possibility of publication for a story entitled Anni hat Unrecht, but was able to obtain an advance payment from Zsolnay Verlag on an exposé for the novel Loni in der Kleinstadt. She left Vienna again in October 1933. Anke Heimberg explains the move away with the Fatherland Front in Austria. The government in Vienna increasingly looked to the Italian fascism as a model. With her partner, Ernst Spitz, Grün traveled via Prague (1933/1934) to Paris (1934/1935).

In the French capital, her health and economic situation deteriorated. The advance payment was soon used up; the royalties from Herz über Bord were not enough. In November 1934, she sold the copyrighted title of her debut novel to Berlin's Allegro Theaterverlag so that it could call an operetta by Eduard Künneke "Herz über Bord." The money could not alleviate Grün's plight: It did not reach her until June 1935, when she was again living in Vienna, to which she had returned in early 1935, seriously ill, and had apparently once again moved into the apartment at Marktgasse 45.

Zsolnay Verlag conducted a fundraising campaign to finance her stay at a spa in Merano for several weeks in the spring of 1935. The novel Loni in der Kleinstadt was finally published as a serialized novel in the Wiener Tag from 7 August 1935, and as a book in the Bibliothek zeitgenössischer Werke, a Zurich branch of Zsolnay Verlag, in October. The last novel Junge Bürokraft übernimmt auch andere Arbeit was published in serialized form in the Wiener Tag in 1936/1937. It was not published in book form until 2016 by AvivA Verlag.

=== Persecution and death ===
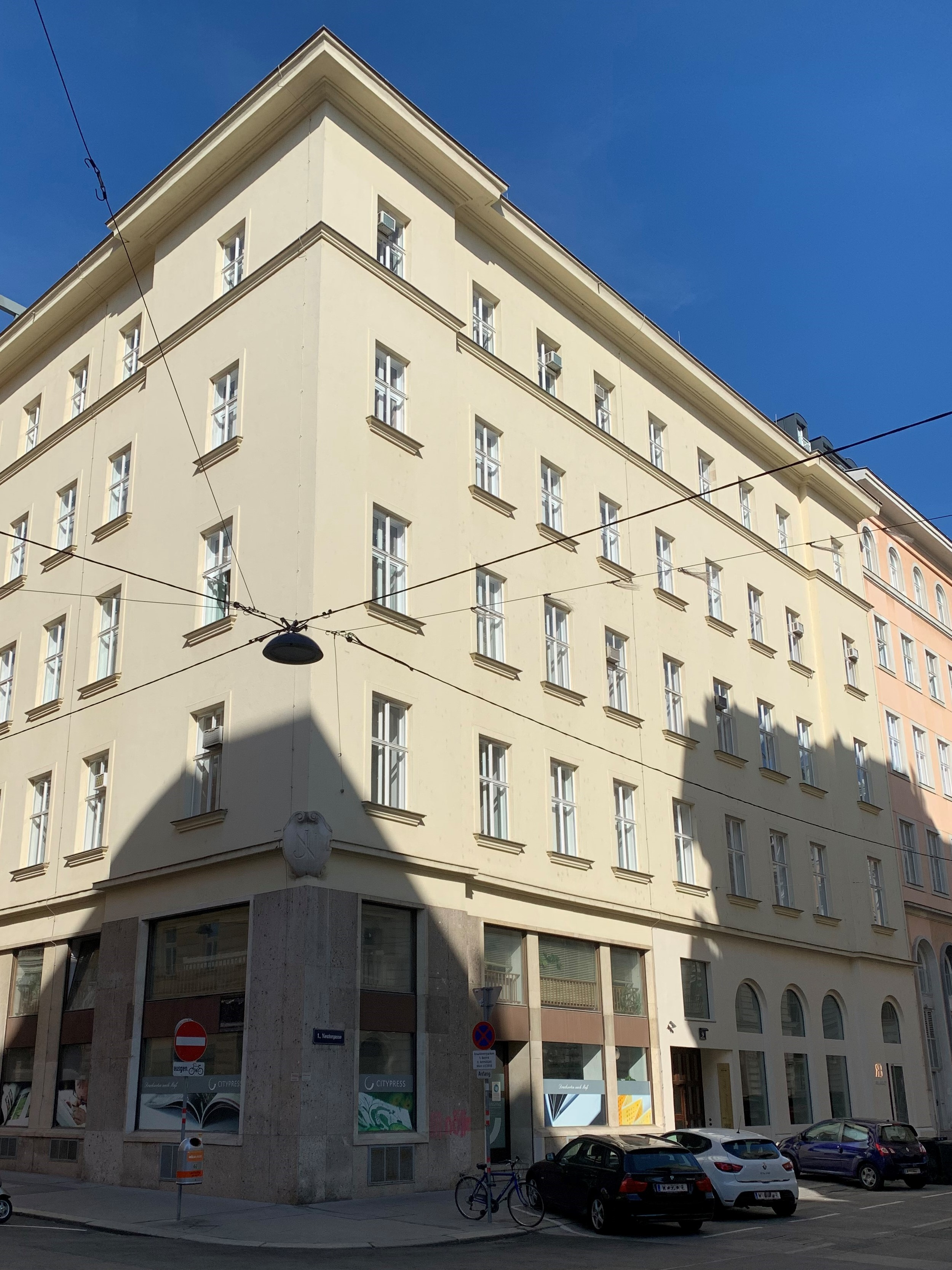
Neutorgasse 9 (2022), Green was housed in apartment no. 6 on the 3rd floor.

After the Anschluss of Austria to the German Reich in March 1938 and the associated persecution and disenfranchisement of Austrian Jews, it was no longer possible for the Jew Lili Grün to work as a writer. She was prevented from emigrating abroad because of her poor health and lack of funds. The "Ordinance Introducing the Law on Tenancies with Jews in the Ostmark" of 10 May 1939, made it possible for apartment owners to terminate Jewish tenants without notice at any time. Grün, too, was forcibly relocated several times and last lived in a "collective apartment" at Neutorgasse 9 in the Innere Stadt.

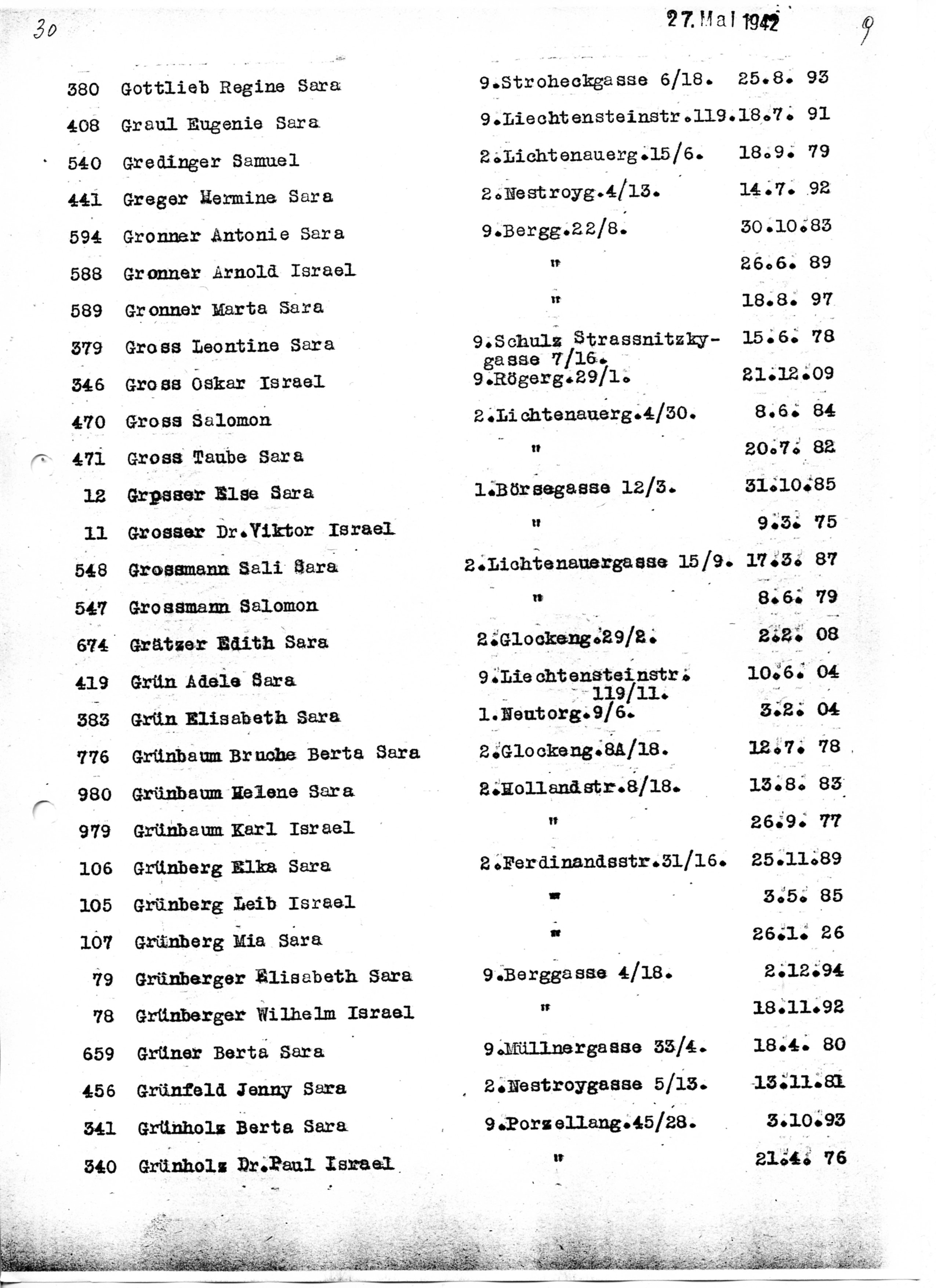
Elisabeth Grün on the transport list for deportation to Minsk on 27 May 1942

On 27 May 1942, she was deported with 980 others in Transport No. 23 from Vienna to Minsk and murdered on the very day of her arrival, 1 June 1942, in the Maly Trostenets extermination camp. With her, the Austrian poet and storyteller Alma Johanna Koenig met her death. The two writers were buried in a mass grave. Presumably, almost all of the deportees were shot by a Sonderkommando of the Waffen-SS consisting of about 80 people. In Maly Trostenets, the largest extermination camp on the territory of the occupied Soviet Union at that time, three "gas vans" were also used from the beginning of June 1942.

== Literary creation ==
=== Herz über Bord (1933) ===
==== Origin ====
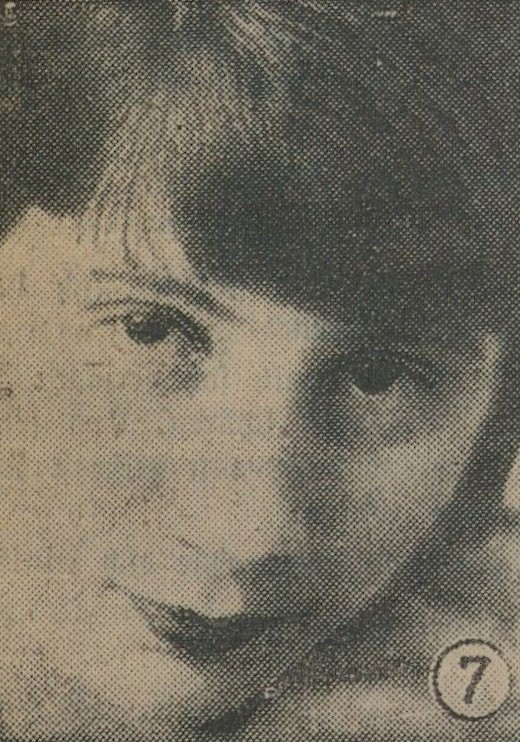
"Lili Grün, the youthful author of the novel Herz über Bord, just published" (Der Wiener Tag, 5 April 1933).

Grün's debut novel, Herz über Bord, was published by Paul Zsolnay Verlag on 16 March 1933, in an edition of 3,000 copies. The author Robert Neumann had placed the author with the publisher. In it, she processed her experiences that she had gathered as a member of the literary-political cabaret Die Brücke in Berlin in 1931. In the novel, the cabaret collective is called Jazz. The title of the new edition of Alles ist Jazz, published by AvivA Verlag in 2009 under the direction of Anke Heimberg, refers to this. The publisher justified the deviation from the original novel title with title protection.

==== Content ====
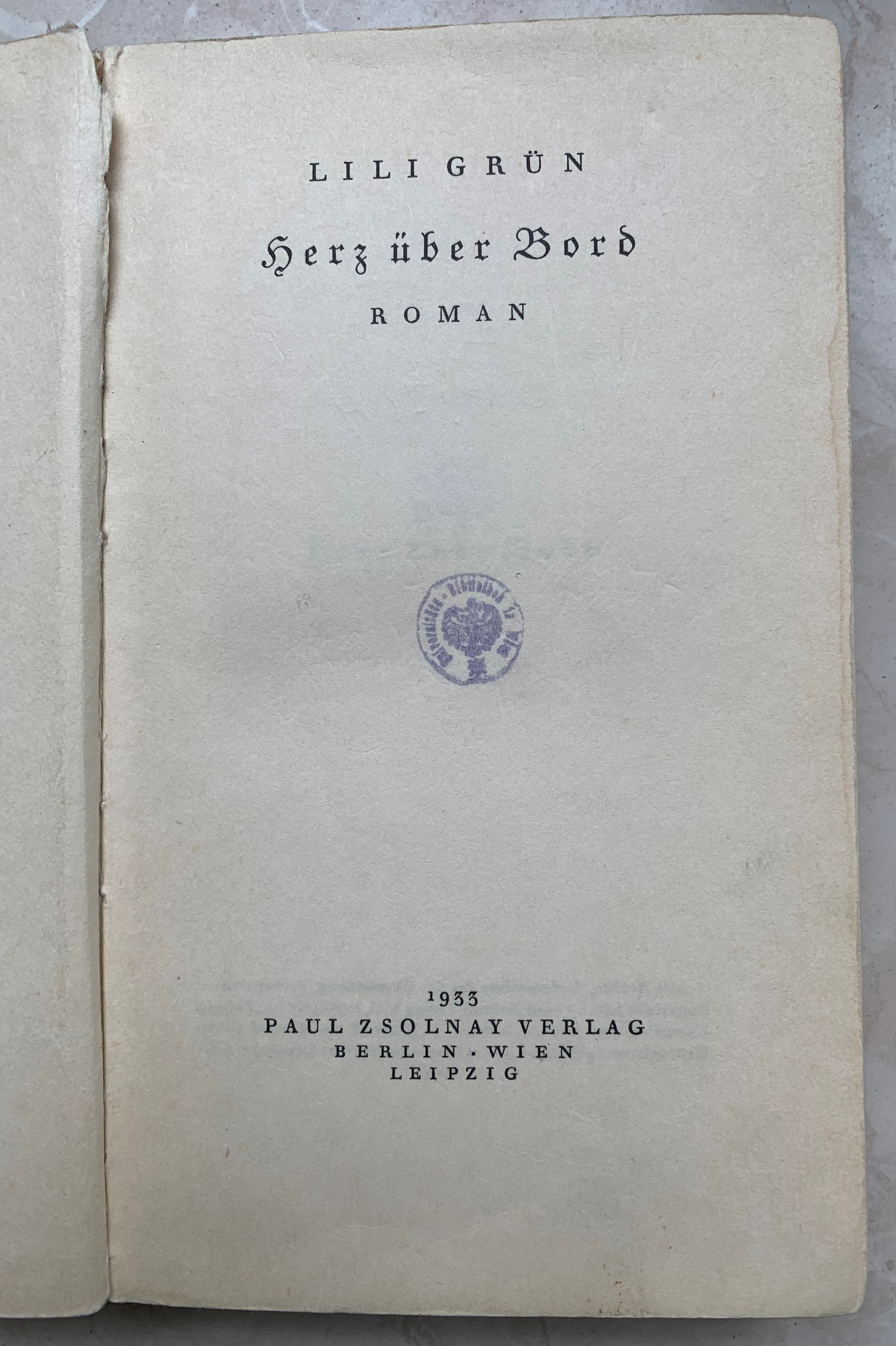
Herz über Bord, cover from 1933

The novel is about the aspiring actress Elli. The protagonist has moved from Vienna to Berlin to become an actress. She is madly in love with Robert, a law student who does not share her enthusiasm for theater. Since the death of her mother, Elli, whose life is marked by poverty, feels lonely. Initial friendships had been disappointing. Elli therefore places all her hopes in Robert and her future in Berlin. When an acquaintance, Hullo, makes plans to start a cabaret, she is thrilled. Together with other actors, they form a collective called Jazz and throw themselves into the preparations, including the actress Hedwig. A quarrel breaks out between Robert and Elli: He thinks playing theater is a waste of time. After long preparation, the cabaret celebrates its premiere – with great success. The group immediately starts working on another program. In a conversation with Hedwig, Elli confesses that Robert doesn't suit her, but that she can't bear the loneliness. Both agree that the right men only exist in dreams. In the middle of the preparations for the next program, Hedwig has to go to the hospital. Elli is supposed to stand by her and finds her seriously ill. The premiere has to take place without Hedwig, who dies a short time later. Fewer and fewer spectators come to the performances. Hullo arranges an interview for Elli with a dramaturge at the theater, who appears arrogant and pretends that he can do nothing for her. Then Hullo arranges an engagement for Elli at the Sternenbar, a meeting place for transvestites. She earns money there, but feels uncomfortable. Other applications remain unsuccessful. Robert confesses to Elli that he has cheated on her. After a cabaret performance, Elli is confronted with a pushy guest. In the end, the cabaret has to close. Elli feels abandoned and enters into a relationship with Hullo, to whom she reveals that she no longer wants to live. A caring letter from a Viennese friend and the memory of past successes give her new confidence. Unexpectedly, she gets an engagement at a theater for the summer months, so that Elli finally looks to the future with hope.

==== Reviews ====
The novel received several positive reviews. Hanns Margulies reviewed no less than three "confession books by young women" in the Wiener Tag of 27 March 1933, placing them in the succession of Irmgard Keun's novel Gilgi - eine von uns. In doing so, he emphasized the professionalism of Lili Grün:

"[She] does not present herself at all like a beginner, so much certainty, so much unity, so much objectivity she brings. [...] Here a young person writes of love and ambition and hunger for life and longing, pours out his heart, his need, his fear of unfulfillability, but this young person nowhere crosses the line between emotion and sentimentality, between genuine experience and kitsch. This novel is magnificent precisely because it avoids any exuberance, because it does not want to pretend anything, because it is pure and true. [...] Lili Grün's first novel is one of the truly endearing and readable books of our time." – Hanns Margulies

Emanuel Häußler, who had met Grün during an interview, drew parallels between the author and her main character in the Neues Wiener Tagblatt on 26 April 1933:

"The book is undoubtedly a very noteworthy contribution to the contemporary history of the young generation, written by a fellow fighter in the great army of the hopeful and nameless, who had to thoroughly taste the purgatory of the beginning. The palette of the young writer has unusually tender and subtle colors, the author knows how to experience, but also to observe and analyze. This little Elli, fluttering like a windblown leaf through the book's joys, disappointments, bitter sadnesses, and sky-rocketing dreams of hope, is her reflection." – Emanuel Häußler

The Austrian writer and publicist Robert Neumann expressed a similar opinion in the Neue Freie Presse on 7 July 1933: The "documentary, literary quality of this first book by a little girl beaten up by life is beyond all doubt. [...] And since it is 'documentary literature', I am not at liberty to reveal that the fate of the heroine is definitely modeled on that of the author. [...] I am not afraid of this Lili Grün. She will make her way." In March 1933, Zsolnay Verlag nominated two novels, in addition to Herz über Bord, the novel Kati auf der Brücke by Hilde Spiel, for the Julius Reich Prize, which the latter received. Grün's novel was published in Hungarian translation by Dante Verlag the same year. An Italian translation followed a year later, published by Genio in Milan. Grün's work was forgotten until the new edition by AvivA Verlag in 2009. On the occasion of the new edition and in view of the writer's early death, Sabine Rohlf stated in Die Zeit on November 4, 2010: "Grün's book about the unsentimental Elli and her newly emancipated generation is not the beginning of a success story, but marks, quite unintentionally, a great loss." In 2011, Hermann Schlösser confirmed the literary skill that Grün had demonstrated with her novel:

"Lili Grün's prose does not report on crises and dangers in an uninvolved reporter's style, but lurches virtuously back and forth between weltschmerz and euphoria, between existential angst and courage to face life. The life crises and occasional love joys of the very emotional Elli [...] are portrayed with great intensity, and for good artistic reason: they are, after all, a reflection of the unsettling, irritating times." – Hermann Schlösser

==== Analyses ====
Maren Lickhardt emphasized that Herz über Bord "can [be] read overall as a Berlin novel" because the numerous concretely named streets and settings were familiar to readers from knowledge of the place or reading experience. In particular, the Romanisches Café plays a significant role because it is used to characterize the characters, in that "being there" decides "being in society." The protagonist's understanding of her role was examined by Helga Schreckenberger, who identifies Elli as a "New Woman". The comparison with the "girl culture" emerging in the 1920s shows that she corresponds to the ideal of beauty, but unlike the "girls" she is not out to secure herself materially through marriage, but to live self-determined, also in sexual terms: Elli is "a representative of the "New Woman", who strove to change her position from sexual object to sexual subject and take possession of her own body being an active agent of her sexual desires and power." (Helga Schreckenberger) Autonomy is also expressed, she says, in the fact that Elli and her partner declare themselves equally responsible for the failure of the relationship and that she can look optimistically to the future after defeats. The work is in the tradition of the jazz novels of the 1920s, to which, however, Grün has added a new dimension through the female narrative perspective: "But instead of the loose women or high society ladies that make up the female protagonists of the male-authored novels, Grün's protagonists are ambitious, hard-working young women, who aim to take charge of their own lives, particularly their love-lives." (Helga Schreckenberger)

=== Loni in der Kleinstadt (1935) ===
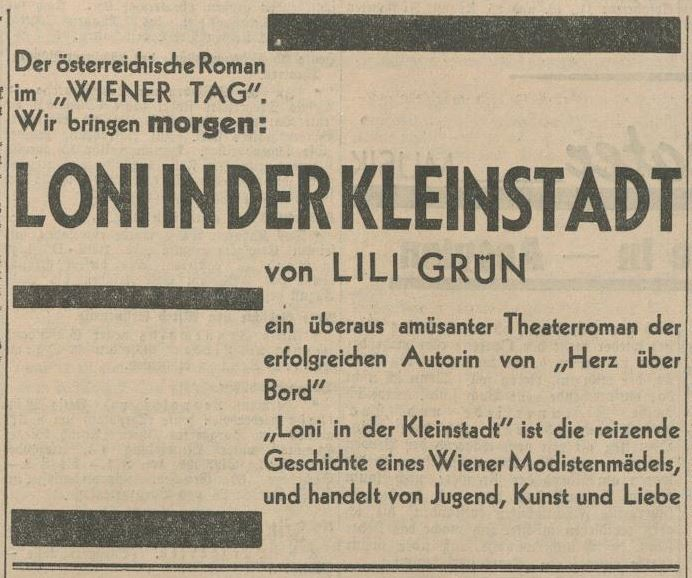
Announcement of Loni in der Kleinstadt in the Wiener Tag of 6 August 1935

==== Origin ====
In 1933, Neumann encouraged Grün to write a novel depicting life and work at a provincial theater. Grün received an advance payment for an exposé of this project, which enabled her to leave Vienna in October of that year and move to Prague and Paris with her partner Ernst Spitz. In November 1934, Grün wrote to the Zsolnay publishing house, "My health is not yet very good, I still have an elevated temperature, cough like an old horse, and am hoarse like a habitual drunkard." Her difficult economic and health situation considerably impaired her work on the novel. Grün wrote further: "in truth, it is really only weeks that separate me from the completion of my work. She would not be able to finish it, however, until the spring of 1935, after her return to Vienna and a stay at a health resort in a lung sanatorium in Merano, which was financed by donations. It was published in the Wiener Tag from August 7, to 13 September 1935, and on October 17 in a small edition of 2000 copies in the Bibliothek zeitgenössischer Werke in Zurich. There, Zsolnay Verlag published books by Jewish authors, which it apparently no longer wanted to include in its Vienna publishing program out of consideration for the German book market. The novel is dedicated to Ernst Spitz. AvivA Verlag published the novel in 2011 "under the contemporary, updated title Zum Theater!", because it was felt that the original title might be reminiscent of a juvenile book.

==== Content ====
18-year-old Loni Holl is training to be a milliner. Her heart, however, belongs to the theater: Loni appears as an extra and takes acting lessons. She meets Peter Spörr, a mediocre director from the provinces, who gives her a guest performance contract in Moravian-Niedau. Once there, the director seduces Loni, who soon learns that he had an affair with the diva Eva Hartenstein, who ended it. The disappointment of not being the only one for Peter Spörr is shortly followed by the realization that the theater does not meet Loni's expectations. Peter behaves contradictorily toward Loni, sometimes affectionately, sometimes tactlessly. Although she disdains comedy, Loni finally succeeds in a comedy, which helps her to get a contract extension. Now she really gets to know theater life in the provinces: a very broad repertoire, vanities in the ensemble, guest performances in the surrounding area, incessant learning of texts, frequent improvisation. Peter and Loni break up because of his confidential conversation with Eva Hartenstein, whereupon Loni moves out and looks for cheap accommodation. Eventually she finds an attic, where she prepares her food in a makeshift manner. At a charity event, she has great success with her poetry recitals and is able to supplement her income. Eva Hartenstein goes back to Munich with her husband, who has traveled there, and this upsets Peter Spörr. The latter plans a last play at the end of the season and gives Loni the leading role. But the director does not show up for the dress rehearsal: he has tried to take his own life. Nevertheless, the premiere is a success. Afterwards, Peter and Loni find their way back to each other.

==== Reviews ====
The Prague literary critic Ludwig Winder judged in the German newspaper Bohemia on 10 November 1935, that the novel was "as clever as it is graceful." The novel is a work of art. The way Grün draws her characters was praised by the reviewer in the Wiener Tag on 6 December 1936, when announcing her third novel. Grün was

"a poet who sees people and their milieu with love and yet knows how to portray them with an unabashed humorous superiority, who cannot prevent the pace of the times from arousing attention and sympathy for the chic of little people, who [sic] observes in an unkitschy reality and portrays it with a great deal of clever [sic] and heartfelt understanding." – Der Wiener Tag

Anke Heimberg confirms the assessment of contemporary critics and situates the novel:

"Indeed, with a few powerful, all the more cheerful strokes, the author succeeds in sketching convincingly and incredibly vividly the world and milieu of a small German-language theater in the Czech provinces in the late 1920s/early 1930s, along with its ensemble and repertory." – Anke Heimberg

Irene Bazinger considers the work a novel of development in which Loni must first learn to reconcile her artistic ideals with the demands of everyday theater life in the province. Her judgment is similar to that of contemporary critics: Lili Grün "does justice to all her very differently drawn, sensually plastic characters" and tells the story with "a lot of heart and humor." Winder recognized in the novel the "stamp of the experienced." As with Herz über Bord, Loni in der Kleinstadt is a novel based on the author's personal experiences. That there was a "Lili in der Kleinstadt" can be assumed.

=== Junge Bürokraft übernimmt auch andere Arbeit… (1936/2016) ===
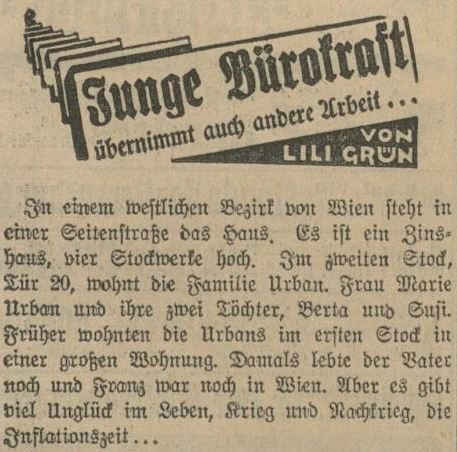
Beginning of the novel in the Wiener Tag of 6 December 1936

==== Origin ====
A letter from Zsolnay Verlag to Grün dated 30 November 1935, indicates that the author received an advance payment for her exposé for her third novel. From 6 December 1936 to 14 January 1937, the work appeared in the Wiener Tag as a serial novel. When the first installment was printed, the novel had just been completed. It was not initially published in book form. The Bibliothek zeitgenössischer Werke, the Zurich publisher of Grün's second novel, had not published anything since 1935 and was dissolved in 1940. The novel was not published as a book until 80 years after it was written, by AvivA Verlag in Berlin.

==== Content ====
As the youngest child of the Urban family, Susi lives with her mother and her sister Berta in Vienna. Her father was killed in the war. The brother Franz, in whom the family once had great hopes, was also in the war, then becomes a delinquent and cannot find his way back to a secure existence. Susi often gets into arguments with her arrogant sister. The mother is helpless in the face of these conflicts. After Franz sells her father's business, Susi takes an unloved job in her uncle's button store. The sixteen-year-old leads a lonely existence until she attends a dance school with her friend Mitzi and begins to have a crush on the piano player Karl. On a later rendez-vous, Susi is sorely disappointed: Karl turns out to be a married man looking for an adventure. Annoyed at the poor treatment and pay in the button store, Susi quits unexpectedly and gets a job as an office worker with the lawyer Dr. Müller, but is not up to the demands there. On New Year's Eve 1923, she meets Egon, a law student with whom she spends a lot of time. When he kisses Mitzi in a wine-fueled mood at his birthday party, Susi feels betrayed and has to accept that Egon will break up with her. Dr. Müller, who is increasingly dissatisfied with her work, dismisses Susi, who with her mother is now dependent on unemployment benefits. From France, Mrs. Urban receives a message from her impoverished son, for whose support she instructs Susi to sell family jewelry. When Berta notices the absence of the jewelry and heirlooms, a heated argument ensues between her and Susi, which so afflicts the ailing mother that she dies shortly thereafter. Afterwards, Franz appears, who, having become impulsive and unrestrained, turns Susi's coat into money. The three siblings clash more and more violently. Susi gets closer to Mitzi again, who helps her find a new job. In response to the dazzling ad "Young office worker also takes on other work," she gets a job as a maid, which includes room and board, and begins to dream of modest happiness.

==== Reviews ====
The announcement of the novel in the Wiener Tag of 6 December 1936, focuses on the lively character drawing and the apt local color:

"It is a Viennese novel and a little girl, who bravely struggles with life, its heroine. Lili Grün takes the fate of this 'office worker' out of reality, and around her the city in its immediate present, with many people we know, is vividly presented, familiar and yet seen as if new by a young poet rooted in this time. A whole district stands before the reader in true Viennese air, and from a hundred small observations an affectionate picture of life today is composed." – Wiener Tag

In his June 6, 2017 review of the book edition of the novel, Rolf Löchel directs his attention to the authorial narrator, who describes Susi Urban's development up to the age of 19:

"but above all, she knows her way around Susi's soul. Only once in a while does she interfere with the events by commenting on them and explaining, for example, that the sacrifices one makes for others never mean as much to them as they do to oneself. Otherwise, she confines herself to telling the story as unpretentiously as Susi herself probably wouldn't do otherwise; on the one hand somewhat naive, on the other slightly melancholy and yet – or perhaps because of that – often enough humorously revealing." – Rolf Löchel

Löchel sees similarities to Irmgard Keun's first novels in the narrative technique, even if the character drawing is different. The reviewer assumes that Grün "will have read and appreciated" Keun's novel Das kunstseidene Mädchen. The parents, who died at an early age, as well as the delinquent brother form parallels between the novel character Susi and her creator. This indicates that Grün's third novel is also autobiographically influenced. To what extent this includes the strained relationship with the older sister remains unknown.

==== Analyses ====
Dieter Wrobel recommended the novel as a reading for German classes. He calls the text a historical novel of adolescence and an exemplary novel of the New Objectivity, which contains an inter-generational perspective (Susi vs. mother) and an intra-generational perspective (Susi vs. Mitzi) and thus invites the discussion of different life concepts. Its achievement consists especially "in the differentiated negotiation of women's roles between modernity and conservatism," which also takes place between the young female characters and enables a critical view of the type of the New Woman.

In addition, the novel lends itself to comparisons with other narratives of Neue Sachlichkeit. Works by Irmgard Keun, Marieluise Fleißer, Vicki Baum, Christa Anita Brück, and Rudolf Braune could be related to Grün's novel, for example, with regard to female and male role patterns as well as social conventions and individual desires.

=== Poems and short prose ===
==== Chronology of publications ====
From September 1929 to October 1937, Grün published a total of 30 poems and 21 feuilletons, small laconic stories, in various German-language newspapers, including Tempo, Stunde, Prager Tagblatt, and Wiener Tag, as well as in magazines such as Uhu - Das Ullstein Magazin, Simplicissimus, and in Die Frechheit, where Grün's text Kurzer Zwischenfall was reprinted in close proximity to Egon Erwin Kisch and Roda Roda. Grün's poems were published in a number of German-language newspapers, including Tempo, der Stunde, Prager Tagblatt, and Wiener Tag. The most poem publications per year fall in her Berlin period (1930) as well as in her time in Prague (1934), where Grün was able to place 13 texts in quick succession in the Prager Montagsblatt alone. Grün presumably performed some poems on the Berlin cabaret stage as cuplé. Four poems and eight short prose texts were published twice, some in modified versions. These secondary uses increased significantly in the last two years of her publishing activity. In 2014, Anke Heimberg published an anthology of "poems and stories" under the title Mädchenhimmel! and made it possible for the first time to get an overview of the literary small forms of the writer, who writes "[f]risch, frech, freimütig und selbstironisch".

==== Reviews ====
Martin Doerry noted in his review of Mädchenhimmel! that it was unclear whether Grün had been a good writer, since her texts could no longer be read without bias because of her fate. Other reviewers saw themselves in a position to judge the work as such and to place it in the context of its time. Thus Georg Renöckl stated:

"Despite the emotional coldness and the financial misery that surrounds her, it is not a tough, hardened woman who speaks here, but an I who does not allow her sensitivity to be taken away. That is precisely the appeal of these poems and stories, which describe everyday relationships with their unkindnesses and role constraints as well as the daily struggle for survival in the interwar years with a sharp eye and even sharper humor, behind which lies bitter seriousness." – Georg Renöckl

Deniz Yücel recognized parallels with other literary figures of the interwar period and with writing women of the present. Grün's poems and feuilletons are a "work of the

"work of the New Objectivity, cooler than Mascha Kaléko, more cheerful than Marieluise Fleißer, close to Irmgard Keun, and at times-as in the ravishing 'Dialogue with Reflections'-also to Kurt Tucholsky. But if one disregards the lack of explicit depiction of sexuality, Grün's texts could be considered contemporary, reminiscent of, say, taz columnists Margarete Stokowski or Franziska Seyboldt." – Deniz Yücel

The anthology won the Melusine Huss Prize at the 2014 Book Prize of Independent German-Language Publishers.

==== Analysis ====
Lili Grün's poems and stories are an expression of the social changes of her time. More and more women worked as salaried employees, but usually performed simple jobs, such as saleswomen and stenotypists. Because of low pay and unsecured employment, it was difficult for many women to become economically independent. The life plans of many women were similarly ambivalent, oscillating between modernity and permissiveness on the one hand and conservative 19th-century models of life on the other. The 1920s were a time in which "the individual found himself in a process of reorientation" and was confronted with a "restructuring of almost all previously practiced forms of life" (Liane Schüller). This search for female identity is reflected in the writer's poems:

"many different female identities [become] discernible in her lyrical subjects. They are female, multifaceted voices that draw on the diverse range of roles of women's typologies that have emerged since the turn of the century, from the 'femme fragile,' 'femme enfant,' and 'femme fatale' to the 'new woman': the 'old' woman of the turn of the century and the 'new' woman of Neue Sachlichkeit can here merge into one and the same figure." – Damaris Türk

In the early poem Monolog (1929), Grün shapes the speaker's precarious economic situation: she cannot afford the rent even though she is on her feet "[d]uring the whole day" (v. 3), trying to find a job. Her efforts are illustrated by "mounted snippets of a job application," but do not lead to success: "And nothing remains but hope for tomorrow." (v. 12). Green's last published poem, Gespräch vor meinem Spiegelbild (1937), on the other hand, is marked by hopelessness: "Ach, ich habʼ gelernt zu resignieren, / Liebe, Glauben, Hoffnung zu verlieren." (V. 14) Damaris Türk recognizes in this text intertextual references to the fairy tale Snow White and to the biblical verse 1 Cor 13:13 EU and identifies in Grün "on the one hand the montage technique, which experiences great popularity in the New Objectivity, and on the other hand it brings religious references into a profane poem that takes up romantic topos." The contrast between reality and another, fairy-tale world is a stylistic device in other poems. In Rezepte fürs Herz (1930), the speaker imagines being born again, in the film. The life in the film is a counter-draft to her own life, in which the man "once faithlessly abandoned" the woman (v. 12) and which seems particularly "banal and sober" because of the contrast to the "wishful fantasies. In Mädchenhimmel! (1930), Grün contrasts the "urban everyday life of a female office worker [with] the idea of a paradise specifically accessible to working women" who band together in a "solidary collective," even against the "boss's wife" (v. 18). The speaker indulges in a paradisiacal imagination, characterized by luxury objects, but without calling for a change in circumstances. Something similar applies to the poem Im Zimmer wird es langsam dunkel (1934), in which fairy tale motifs, here from Hansel and Gretel, are again contrasted with reality. Here the speaker addresses "Ernst" (v. 20), undoubtedly Green's companion Ernst Spitz, who is supposed to kill "the wicked, wicked witch" (v. 16). In the repeated verse "You are big and I am small" (v. 3, v. 28), it becomes clear that "the articulating I thus places itself in the position of a child in need of help, tends to be unemancipated, and pursues a classical concept of love in which the man rescues and protects the woman." Counter-examples to this motif design include Ein Fräulein erwacht in einer fremden Wohnung (1931) or Uralte Liebesmelodie (1934).

"In addition to the naïve and dreaming employee in Mädchenhimmel!, the other women in Lili Grün's poems also show themselves caught between contradictory ideas such as idealization of the living world and desires for change, references to the past and future scenarios, independence and dependence, new freedoms and old restrictions."

– Damaris Türk

== Reception ==
After her murder, Grün fell into oblivion. Her name did not reappear in specialist literature until 1976: The writer and journalist Hilde Spiel noted: "In extermination camps, among many others, died [...] Lili Grün (1907–?), a touching girl who emerged for the first time in the fatal year 1933 with her tender novel Herz über Bord. Her life story would remain obscure, and she would be wiped off the face of the earth as if she had never existed, were no mention made of her here." Green's novels were not available in bookstores.

Since 2009, her work has been published by AvivA Verlag Berlin. Two years earlier, while searching for literature by women from the Golden Twenties, Anke Heimberg discovered Grün's Berlin cabaret novel Herz über Bord at a flea market. The publicist then began research on the forgotten writer. She initially found little data in biographical literary encyclopedias and set out on her own in search of clues. In all four books published by AvivA Verlag, there is a detailed afterword in which she presents Grün's life and work.

=== Art ===
In 2016, Thomas Fatzinek published the graphic novel entitled Schwere Zeiten – Das Leben der Lili Grün. In it, the illustrator illustrates all the significant stages of the author's life, supplemented by details of the political developments in Germany and Austria, which became increasingly life-threatening for Lili Grün and her partner Ernst Spitz. Fatzinek several times mixes Grün's reconstructed life with plots from her novels, such as her acquaintance with Hullo, the name of the cabaret Jazz, and her work in the "Sternenbar" (from Herz über Bord), or her relationship with a law student and her friendship with Mitzi (from Junge Bürokraft übernimmt auch andere Arbeit...).

In 2018, the Theater Forum Schwechat staged "Ich bin so scharf auf Seele" – Das Leben der Lili Grün. In the production, described as a "[h]istorical musical-cabaret piece," author and director Marius Schiener arranged stations in Grün's life on the basis of her literary texts. The first, cheerful half also showed Berlin cabaret life; the second, somber part addressed Grün's illness, her persecution, and her deportation. Intendant and artistic director Manuela Seidl commissioned the play and also played the title role, accompanied by Johannes Kemetter, who impersonated various characters.

On the occasion of the festival year "1700 Years of Jewish Life in Germany" (2021/2022), the Dresden ensemble YOUKALI set several of Grün's poems to music and developed the program "Halte dich an Wunder – Großstadtlieder in Szene" (Hold on to Miracles – Big City Songs in Scene) from them, which was supplemented with texts by Mascha Kaléko. The quartet (piano, cello, clarinet, vocals) has been in existence since 2015 and mixes classical music with elements from jazz, tango, pop, and klezmer. Among the texts interpreted are Einzelhaftpsychose, Der Schuft, Schüchterner Flirt mit dem vermummten Herr, and Gespräch vor meinem Spiegelbild.

=== Commemoration ===
Grün is remembered in Vienna's 2nd district: since 2007, a stone of remembrance at Heinestraße 4 has commemorated the author. At the intersection of Castellezgasse and Klanggasse, the Lili Grün Platz was inaugurated with a ceremony on 14 May 2009. The district representation supported in the fall of 2008 – the Freedom Party of Austria therein voted against – the initiative of the booksellers Andrea and Kurt Lhotzky.

In the Berlin district of Marzahn-Hellersdorf, a Lili-Grün-Weg was inaugurated on 30 August 2017. The motion to name the street in the new settlement was introduced by the SPD faction in the district council and supported there. Interhomes AG, as the developer of the settlement, followed this proposal.

On 11 March 2018, a program about green was broadcast by Doris Glaser in the series Contra – Kabarett und Kleinkunst on the radio Ö1 of the channel ORF.

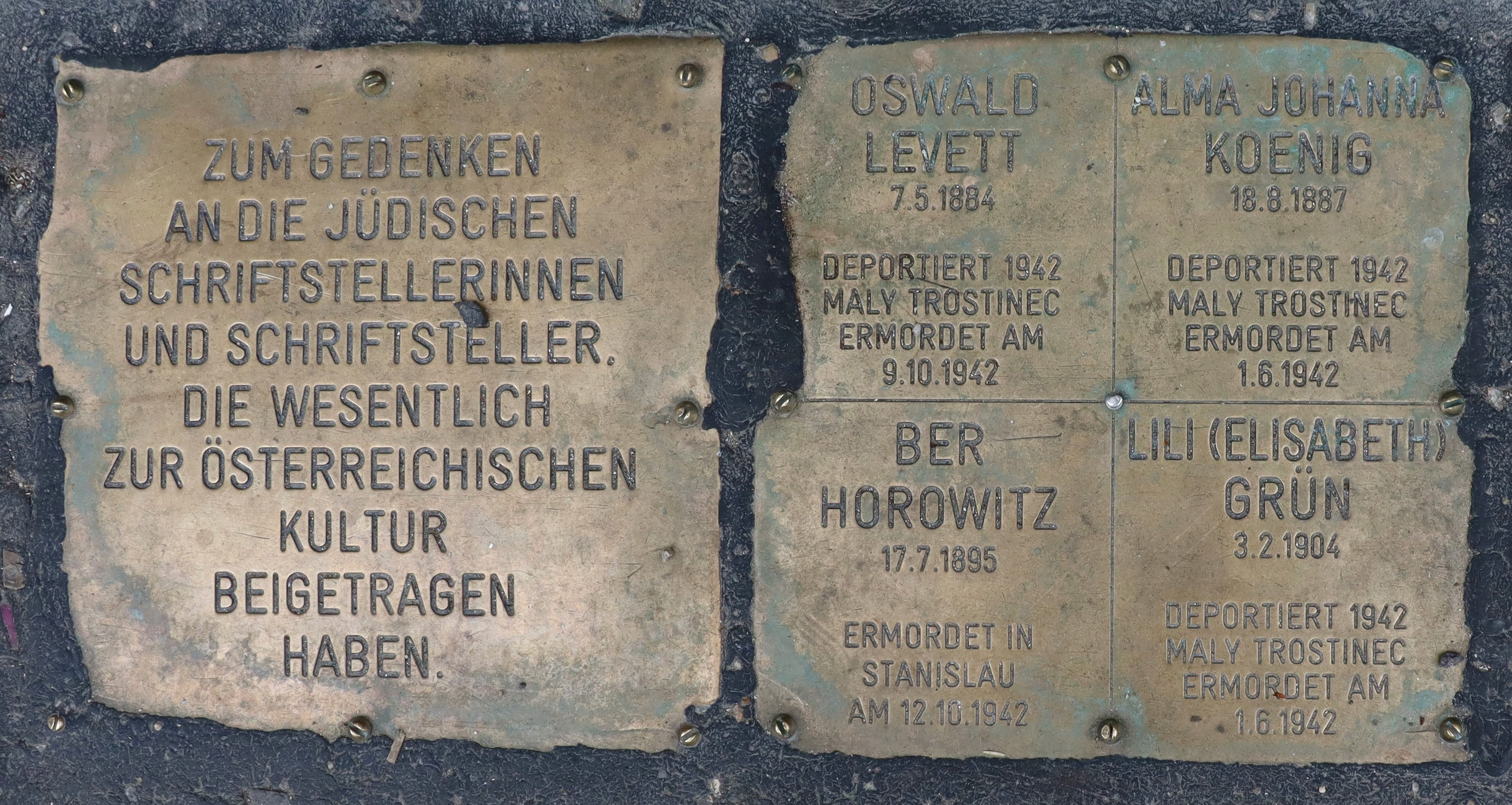
Stone of Remembrance in Vienna-Leopoldstadt, Heinestraße 4

Commemorative plaque in Vienna-Alsergrund, Marktgasse 45

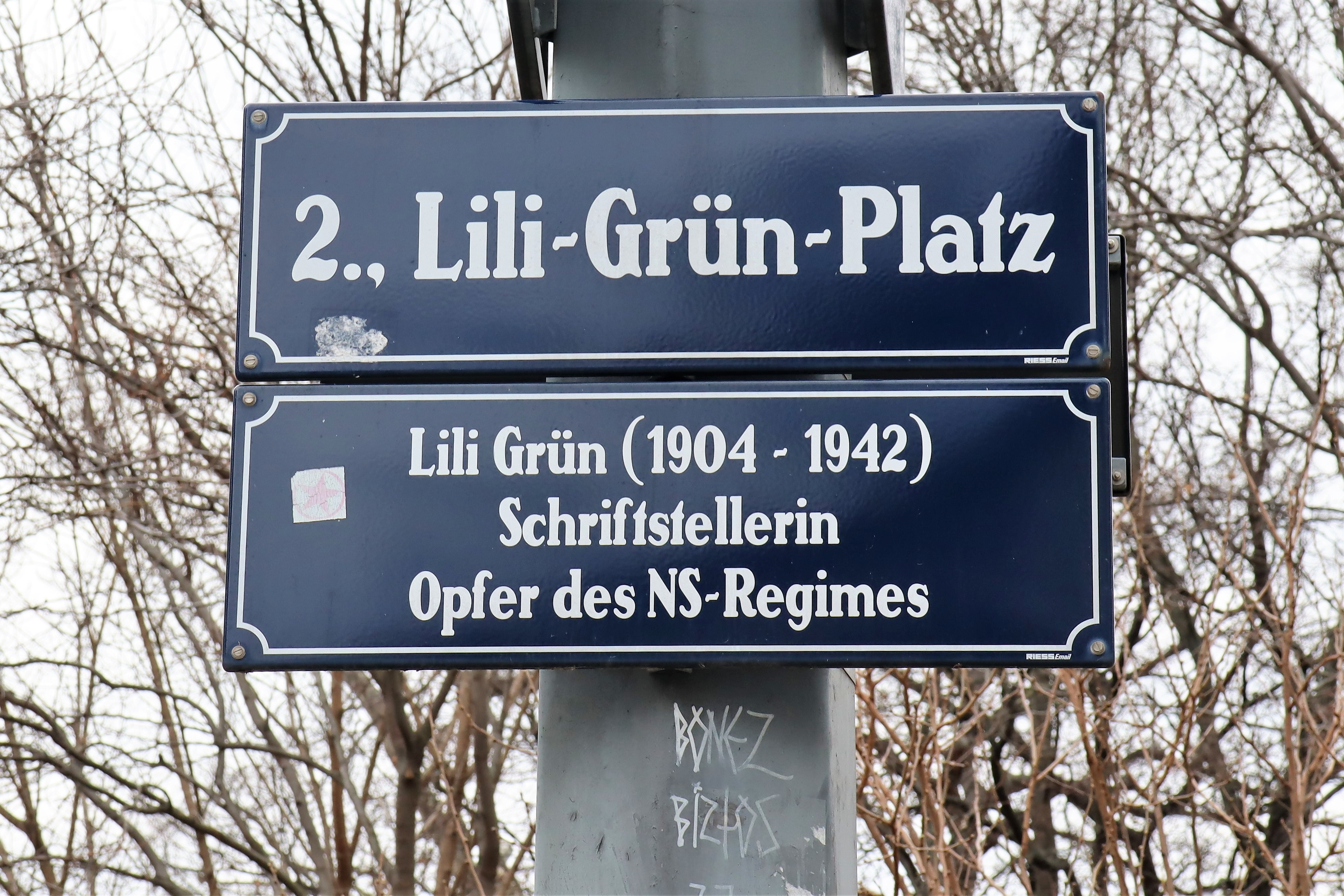
Sign Lili-Grün-Platz in Vienna-Leopoldstadt

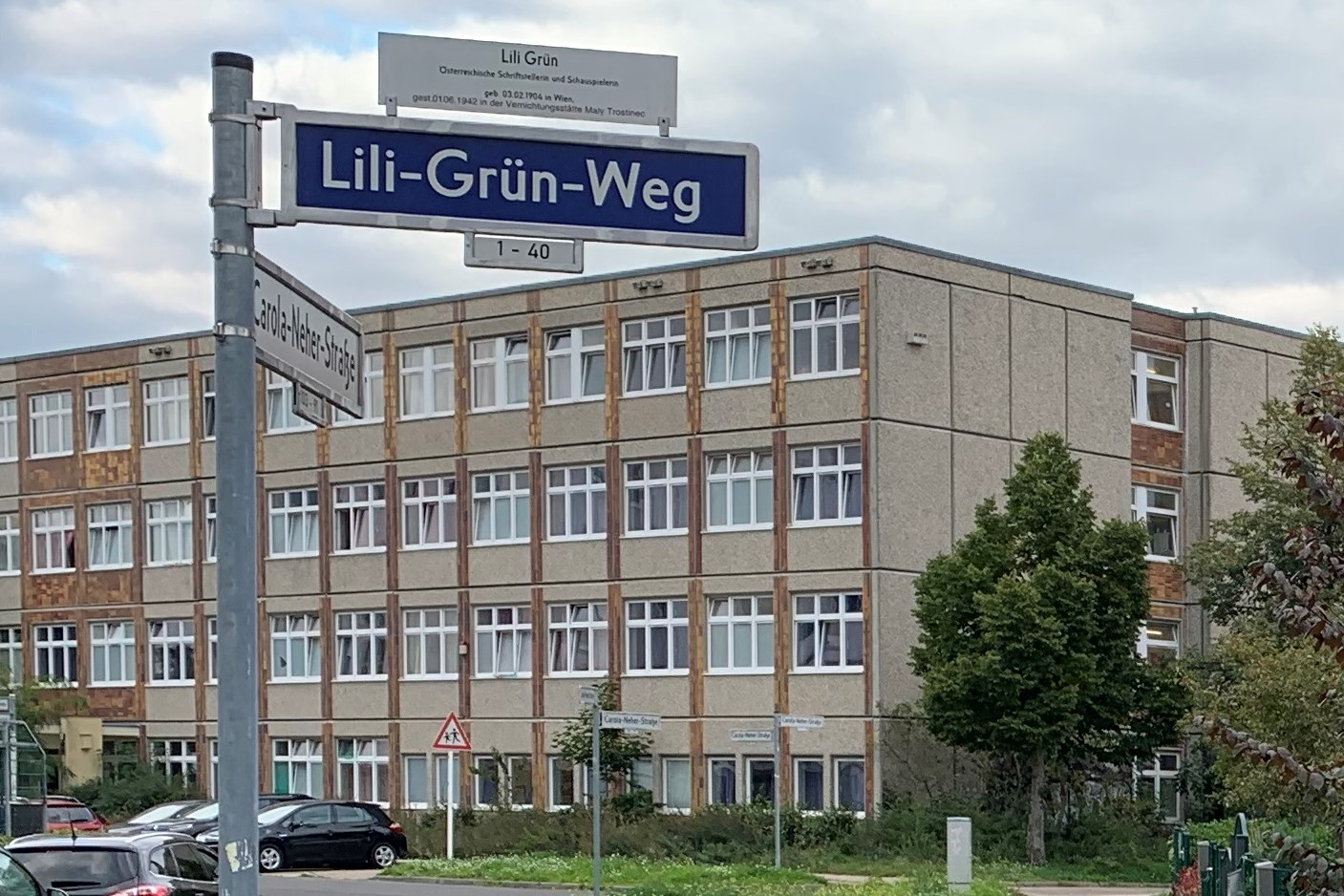
Sign Lili-Grün-Weg in Berlin-Hellersdorf

== Works ==
- Herz über Bord. Roman. Paul Zsolnay Verlag, Berlin/Wien/Leipzig 1933.
  - Translation into Hungarian: Egy szív gazdát keres. Übersetzt von Margit Dávid Gáspárné. Dante Könyvkiadó, Budapest 1933.
  - Translation into Italian: Povero amore! Translated by Lila Jahn. S.A. Editrice Genio, Mailand 1934.
  - New edition: Alles ist Jazz. Roman. Edited and with an epilogue by Anke Heimberg. AvivA Verlag, Berlin 2009, 2. Auflage 2011, 3., überarb. Auflage 2022, ISBN 978-3-949302-12-1. As a Hörbuch: Alles ist Jazz, read by Katharina Straßer. Mono Verlag, Wien 2011, ISBN 978-3-902727-87-9.
  - Italian new edition: Tutto è jazz. Translated by Enrico Arosio. Keller, Rovereto 2018, ISBN 978-88-99911-31-7.
  - Translation into French: Tout est jazz! Translated by Sylvaine Duclos. Les Éditions du Typhon, Marseille 2024, ISBN 978-2-490501-39-7.
- Loni in der Kleinstadt. Roman. Bibliothek zeitgenössischer Werke, Zürich 1935.
  - New edition: Zum Theater! Roman. Edited and with an epilogue by Anke Heimberg. AvivA Verlag, Berlin 2011, ISBN 978-3-932338-47-2.
- Junge Bürokraft übernimmt auch andere Arbeit… Roman. Wien, Zeitungsabdruck im Wiener Tag 1936/37.
  - First edition: Junge Bürokraft übernimmt auch andere Arbeit… Roman. Edited and with an epilogue by Anke Heimberg. AvivA Verlag, Berlin 2016, ISBN 978-3-932338-86-1.
- Mädchenhimmel! Gedichte und Geschichten. Collected, edited, annotated and with an epilogue by Anke Heimberg, AvivA Verlag, Berlin 2014, ISBN 978-3-932338-58-8.

== Bibliography ==
- Hans Giebisch, Gustav Gugitz: Bio-bibliographisches Literaturlexikon Österreichs. Von den Anfängen bis zur Gegenwart. Hollinek, Wien 1964, p. 125.
- Hilde Spiel (Hrsg.): Die zeitgenössische Literatur Österreichs (= Kindlers Literaturgeschichte der Gegenwart. Autoren, Werke, Themen, Tendenzen seit 1945.). Kindler, Zürich u. a. 1976, ISBN 3-463-22003-2, p. 43.
- Siglinde Bolbecher, Konstantin Kaiser: Lexikon der österreichischen Exilliteratur. Deuticke, Wien 2000, ISBN 3-216-30548-1, pp. 262f.
- Eckart Früh (Hrsg.): Lili (Elisabeth) Grün (= Spuren und Überbleibsel. Bio-bibliographische Blätter. Band 61). Selbstverlag, Wien 2005.
- Corinna Prey (2011), Leben und Werk der Schriftstellerin Lili Grün (Diplomarbeit), Wien, URN: nbn:at:at-ubw:1-29378.70658.561563-7
- Hermann Schlösser: Ein Gedenkblatt für Lili Grün. In: ders.: Die Wiener in Berlin. Ein Künstlermilieu der 20er Jahre. Edition Steinbauer, Wien 2011, ISBN 978-3-902494-51-1, pp. 97–101.
- Katharina Achtsnith: Von Indianermädchen und Schafen. Die „Neue Frau“ zwischen Realität und Fiktion in Lili Grüns Romanen „Herz über Bord“, „Loni in der Kleinstadt“ und „Junge Bürokraft übernimmt auch andere Arbeit“. Diplomarbeit. Wien 2014, online.
- Thomas Fatzinek: Schwere Zeiten. Das Leben der Lili Grün. Verlag bahoe books, Wien 2016, ISBN 978-3-903022-41-6.
- Maren Lickhardt: Pop in den 20er Jahren. Leben, Schreiben, Lesen zwischen Fakt und Fiktion. Winter, Heidelberg 2018, ISBN 978-3-8253-6660-5, passim.
- Helga Schreckenberger: Jazz and the "New Woman": Lili Grün's Novel Alles ist Jazz (1933). In: Kirsten Krick-Aigner, Marc-Oliver Schuster (Hrsg.): Jazz in word. European (non-)fiction. Königshausen & Neumann, Würzburg 2018, ISBN 978-3-8260-6341-1, pp. 235–246.
- Damaris Türk (22 July 2019), "Tagträume einer Angestellten. Lili Grüns "Mädchenhimmel!"", IZGOnZeit. Onlinezeitschrift des Interdisziplinären Zentrums für Geschlechterforschung (IZG), pp. 86–99, doi:10.4119/izgonzeit-1599, ISSN 2567-2045
- Dieter Wrobel: Vergessene Texte der Moderne wiedergelesen. Lili Grün: Junge Bürokraft übernimmt auch andere Arbeit. In: Literatur im Unterricht: Texte der Gegenwartsliteratur für die Schule. 20. Jg., H. 3, 2019, ISSN 1615-6447, pp. 267–283.
