= Monika Czernin =

Austrian writer and screenwriter

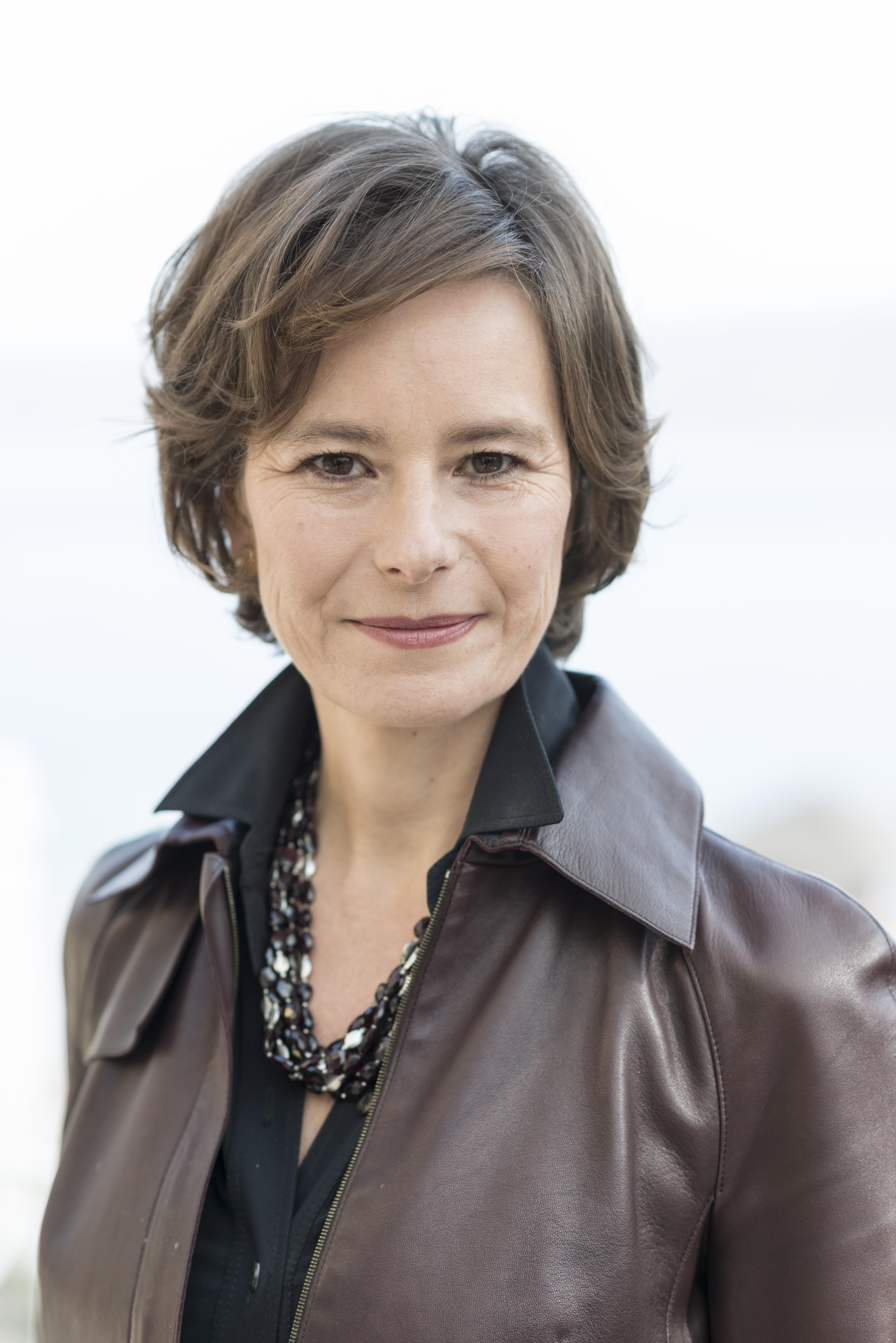
- Czernin, 2014
- Born: 18 February 1965 (age 61); Klagenfurt, Austria
- Occupations: Author, filmmaker
- Website: www.monikaczernin.com

Monika Czernin (born 18 February 1965) is an Austrian writer, screenwriter, actress and film director.

== Education and early career ==
Czernin studied education, political science, philosophy and journalism at the University of Vienna.

== Family background, books and films ==
In 1999, as a young mother, she published her first educational book Jeder Augenblick ein Staunen. Vom Abenteuer, mit einem Kind zu wachsen (Each Moment a Marvel. On the adventure of growing with a child). After her marriage ended, she published the book Glückliche Scheidungskinder (Happy Children of Divorce, 2003) about children of divorced parents with the Swiss pediatrician Remo H. Largo. In 2011, in cooperation with Largo, she published Jugendjahre. Kinder durch die Pubertät begleiten (Teenage Years. Guiding Children through Puberty) about the problems of adolescents such as computer addiction, school fatigue and binge drinking.

In 2013, she published Marie von Miller: Die Malerin an der Seite Oskar von Millers, a biography of her artist great grandmother.

In 2021, she published her book Der Kaiser reist inkognito: Joseph II. und das Europa der Aufklärung about Emperor Joseph II and his travels around Europe, which ended up seventh on the best books list of Die Welt in May 2021. The emperor Joseph II traveled some 50,000 km during his reign from 1765 and 1790. The book was subsequently translated into English as The Emperor Incognito by Jamie Bulloch and published by Haus Publishing in 2026.

Czernin wrote her first documentary, Adel verpflichtet (2000), together with Ernst A. Grandits. The film focused on famous noble families from Austria, Bohemia, Hungary and Croatia. Her first docu-fiction followed in 2001: Picassos Friseur, directed together with Felix Breisach.

In 2017, she wrote the screenplay and directed the docu-fiction Universum History – Maria Theresia – Majestät und Mutter about the Austrian Empress Maria Theresia.

She wrote and directed the docu-fiction Universum History Atatürk – The Father of Modern Turkey about Kemal Atatürk, released in 2018.

In 2022, together with Max Jacobi, she directed the docu-fiction Erbe Österreich: Joseph II. – Kaiser und Rebell about the Austrian Emperor Joseph II.

== Books ==
- 1999: Jeder Augenblick ein Staunen, Walter Verlag, Zürich 1999, ISBN 978-3-530-60053-7; Piper-Verlag, München/Zürich 2002, ISBN 978-3-492-23695-9.
- 2001: Picassos Friseur. Die Geschichte einer Freundschaft, gemeinsam mit Melissa Müller, Kiepenheuer & Witsch, Köln 2001, ISBN 978-3-462-02980-2.
- 2003: Gebrauchsanweisung für Wien, Piper Verlag, München 2003, ISBN 978-3-492-27511-8.
- 2003: Glückliche Scheidungskinder, gemeinsam mit Remo H. Largo, Piper Verlag, München 2003, ISBN 978-3-492-04417-2.
- 2004: Duino, Rilke und die Duineser Elegien, dtv-Verlag, München 2004, ISBN 978-3-423-34108-0; Christian Brandstätter Verlag, Wien 2004, ISBN 978-3-85498-363-7.
- 2005: Ich habe zu kurz gelebt. Die Geschichte der Nora Gräfin Kinsky, List Verlag, Berlin 2005, ISBN 978-3-471-77276-8.
- 2008: Dieses herrliche Gefühl der Freiheit. Frieda von Bülow und die Sehnsucht nach Afrika, List Verlag, Berlin 2008, ISBN 978-3-471-77279-9.
- 2011: Lisa, Prinzessin über Nacht, mit Zeichnungen von Kera Till, Hanser Verlag Kinder- und Jugendbuch, München 2011, ISBN 978-3-446-23784-1.
- 2011: Jugendjahre, gemeinsam mit Remo H. Largo, Piper Verlag, München 2011, ISBN 978-3-492-05445-4.
- 2013: Marie von Miller: Die Malerin an der Seite Oskar von Millers, Volk Verlag, München 2013, ISBN 978-3-86222-119-6.
- 2014: Das letzte Fest des alten Europa: Anna Sacher und ihr Hotel, Albrecht Knaus Verlag, München 2014, ISBN 978-3-8135-0434-7. Als TB "Anna Sacher und ihr Hotel. Im Wien der Jahrhundertwende", TB Penguin Verlag, München 2014, ISBN 978-3-328-10058-4
- 2017: Maria Theresia – Liebet mich immer. Briefe an ihre engste Freundin, gemeinsam mit Jean-Pierre Lavandier, Ueberreuter-Verlag, Wien 2017, ISBN 978-3-8000-7664-2.
- 2021: Der Kaiser reist inkognito: Joseph II. und das Europa der Aufklärung, Penguin, München 2021, ISBN 978-3-328-60057-2.
- 2021: HASSLACHER Holding GmbH | Monika Czernin: From wood to wonders. 120 years of Hasslacher. English edition, December 2021, 240 pages. ISBN 978-3-7106-0521-5.

== Filmography ==
- 2001: Picassos Friseur (director together with Felix Breisach)
- 2005: Hitler und der Adel (writer together with Melissa Müller, director)
- 2007: Die Gräfin und die Russische Revolution – Nora Kinsky – Die Rotkreuzbaronin (writer, director and lead actor)
- 2008: Alte Mauern – neue Ideen. Menschen in Europa (director)
- 2010: Der Traum vom Gelobten Land – Theodor Herzl und das moderne Israel (writer together with Melissa Müller, director)
- 2012: Bergwelten – Vom Sinn des Lebens: Viktor Frankl – Zum 15. Todestag (writer and director)
- 2014: Universum History – Diplomatische Liebschaften – Die Mätressen des Wiener Kongresses (writer together with Melissa Müller, director)
- 2015: Remo Largo – Ein Leben für unsere Kinder (52 min. documentary, writer and director together with Aldo Gugolz)
- 2017: Universum History – Maria Theresia – Majestät und Mutter (writer and director)
- 2018: Universum History – Atatürk – Vater der modernen Türkei (writer and director) / Atatürk – Visionär, Revolutionär, Reformer; English version: Universum History Atatürk – The Father of Modern Turkey.
- 2022: Erbe Österreich: Joseph II. – Kaiser und Rebell (writer, director together with Max Jacobi)
