= Susanne Ayoub =

Austrian-Iraqi writer, journalist and filmmaker

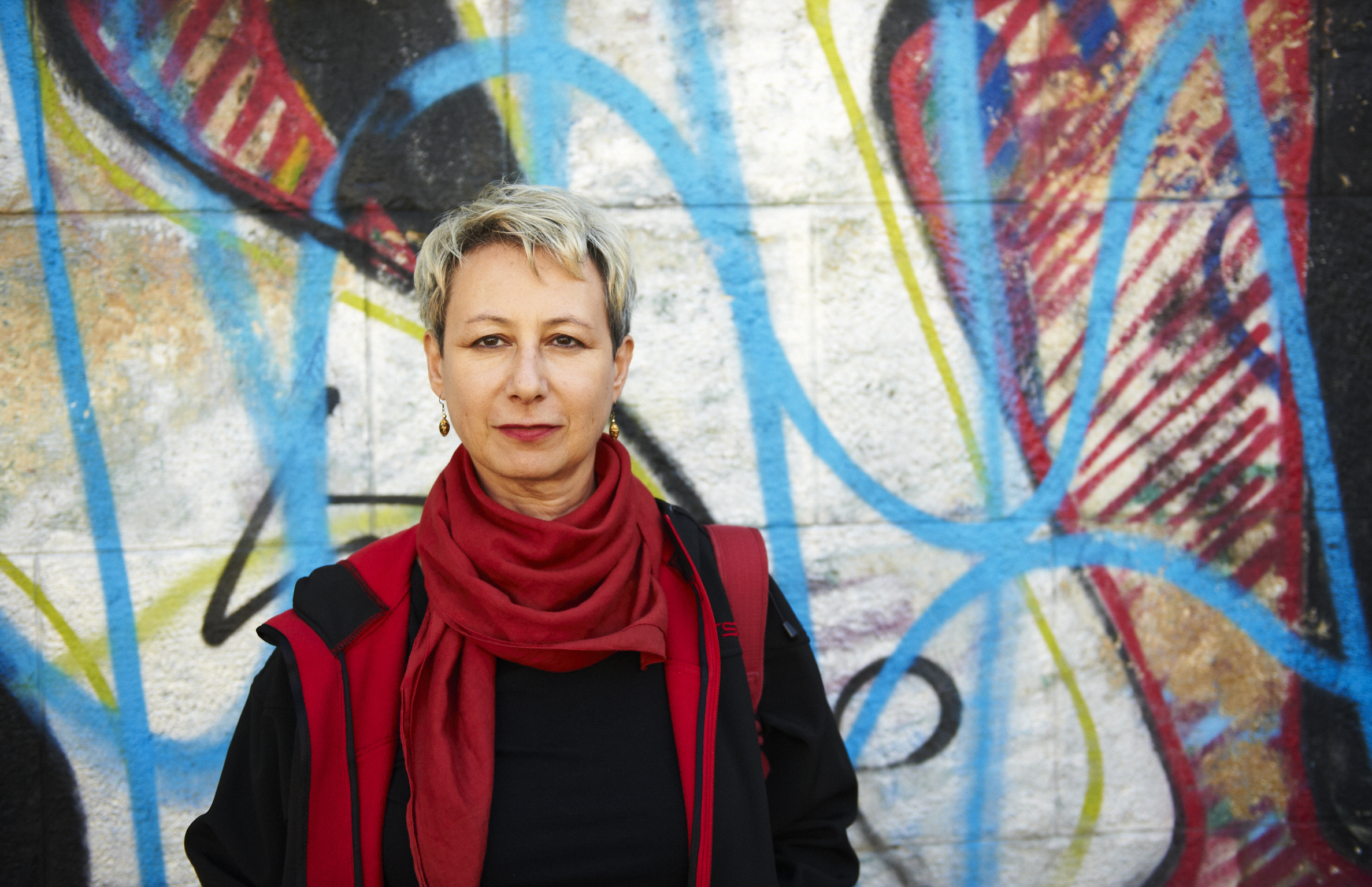
Ayoub in March 2015

Susanne Ayoub (Arabic: سوزان أيوب; born 1956 in Baghdad) is an Austrian-Iraqi writer, journalist and filmmaker. She is known primarily for her crime novels, such as Engelsgift (2004), published by Hoffmann und Campe in Hamburg, which became an international success. The substance of her work often draws upon real experiences of women and then processed as fiction.

In 2014, Ayoub won the Karl Renner Prize in radio for the "Hörbild" presentation of "Prinzessin Vukobrankovics. Die drei Leben der Elisabeth Thury".
