= Rebling =

Rebling is a surname, likely of German origin. Notable people with the surname include:

- Eberhard Rebling (1911–2008), German pianist, musicologist, dance scholar, and anti-fascist
- Jalda Rebling (born 1951), German hazzan
- Kathinka Rebling (1941–2020), German violinist and musicologist
