= Tablets of Stone =

Two pieces of stone inscribed with Ten Commandments

According to the Hebrew Bible, the Tablets of the Law (also Tablets of Stone, Stone Tablets, or Tablets of Testimony; Biblical Hebrew: לוּחֹת הַבְּרִית lūḥōṯ habbǝrīṯ "tablets of the covenant", לֻחֹת הָאֶבֶן luḥōṯ hāʾeḇen or לֻחֹת אֶבֶן luḥōṯ ʾeḇen or לֻחֹת אֲבָנִים luḥōṯ ʾăḇānīm "stone tablets", and לֻחֹת הָעֵדֻת luḥōṯ hāʿēḏuṯ "tablets of testimony") were the two stone tablets inscribed with the Ten Commandments when Moses ascended Mount Sinai as written in the Book of Exodus.

According to the biblical narrative, the first set of tablets, inscribed by the finger of God, (Exodus 31:18) were smashed by Moses when he was enraged by the sight of the Children of Israel worshiping a golden calf (Exodus 32:19), and the second were later chiseled out by Moses and rewritten by God (Exodus 34:1).

According to traditional teachings of Judaism in the Talmud, the stones were made of blue sapphire as a symbolic reminder of the sky, the heavens, and ultimately of God's throne. Many Torah scholars, however, have opined that the biblical sapir was, in fact, lapis lazuli (see Exodus 24:10: lapis lazuli is a possible alternative rendering of "sapphire", the stone pavement under God's feet when the intention to craft the tablets of the covenant is disclosed Exodus 24:12).

According to Exodus 25:10–22, the tablets were stored in the Ark of the Covenant.

== Terminology and symbolism ==
In the Hebrew Bible, the tablets are referred to by several names that emphasize different aspects of their function and meaning. The term luhot ha-berit (“tablets of the covenant”) underscores their role as the physical embodiment of the covenant between God and the Israelites, while luhot ha-edut (“tablets of testimony”) highlights their function as a witness to divine revelation and obligation. Rabbinic literature frequently emphasizes the symbolic significance of the tablets as both divine and material objects: heavenly in origin yet carried, broken, and renewed through human action. The breaking of the first tablets is traditionally understood not merely as an act of anger, but as a dramatic expression of the rupture of the covenant, while the second tablets represent repentance and restoration of the relationship between God and Israel.

== The first and second tablets in Jewish tradition ==
Jewish tradition draws a significant distinction between the first and second sets of tablets. According to rabbinic interpretation, both the broken first tablets and the intact second tablets were placed together in the Ark of the Covenant. This juxtaposition has been understood symbolically as affirming the enduring value of failure and rupture alongside renewal and wholeness. Medieval Jewish commentators further note differences between the two sets: the first tablets are described as entirely divine in origin, while the second involve human participation, as Moses is instructed to hew the stone himself. This distinction has been interpreted as reflecting a transition from a purely miraculous revelation to a covenant sustained through human responsibility.

== Covenantal interpretation in Jewish tradition ==
In rabbinic and medieval Jewish interpretation, the tablets are understood as covenantal documents that formalize the relationship between God and Israel. The Mekhilta of Rabbi Ishmael describes the tablets as testimony (edut) of the covenant established at Sinai, while the Sifre Deuteronomy emphasizes their function as witness to the obligations binding both parties. Ramban (Nachmanides), commenting on Exodus 24:12, explicates this treaty framework more fully, arguing that the tablets serve as the written terms of the brit (covenant), with the Ten Commandments functioning as the foundational stipulations analogous to ancient Near Eastern suzerainty treaties. This interpretation connects the physical tablets to the broader legal corpus of the Torah, positioning them not merely as moral precepts but as the constitutional foundation of Israel's covenantal relationship with God. In this view, the placement of the tablets within the Ark of the Covenant parallels the ancient practice of depositing treaty documents in temples as sacred witnesses.

== Breaking of the first tablets ==
In rabbinic interpretation, Moses' breaking of the first tablets is portrayed not as an act of uncontrolled anger but as a necessary and divinely sanctioned response to Israel's violation of the covenant through the golden calf. The Talmud (Shabbat 87a) records that God affirmed Moses' action with the words "יישר כחך ששיברת" ("Well done for breaking them"), suggesting that the tablets could not remain intact once the covenantal terms they represented had been violated. Rashi, commenting on Exodus 32:19, explains that Moses reasoned that if even a single Israelite who had not participated in idolatry was forbidden to eat the Passover offering, how much more so should the entire nation be denied the tablets after committing idolatry. Exodus Rabbah (46:1) further develops this theme, comparing the breaking to the annulment of a marriage contract (ketubah) when one party violates its terms; the physical destruction of the covenant document reflects the spiritual rupture that had already occurred. In this view, the breaking of the tablets maintains the integrity of the covenantal relationship by acknowledging that the conditions under which they were given no longer existed, making their preservation impossible until the covenant could be renewed.

== Human participation in the second tablets ==
Jewish tradition distinguishes sharply between the first and second sets of tablets, emphasizing that while the first were entirely divine in origin, both the stone and the writing were the work of God, the second tablets involved human participation. According to Exodus 34:1, God commands Moses: "Carve out two tablets of stone like the first, and I will inscribe upon the tablets the words that were on the first tablets, which you shattered." The contrast is explicit in Exodus 31:18, which describes the first tablets as "inscribed by the finger of God", while the second required Moses to hew the stone himself. The Talmud and Midrash highlight this distinction, interpreting it as a demonstration that the renewal of the covenant required both divine guidance and human responsibility.

== The broken tablets as a model for sanctity despite damage ==
In Jewish tradition, the broken tablets retain their sanctity and significance even after being shattered. The Talmud notes that both the broken first tablets and the intact second tablets were placed together in the Ark of the Covenant, emphasizing that holiness is not lost through imperfection. Midrashic and rabbinic sources further interpret this as a broader lesson: even objects or people that have been “broken” can continue to carry spiritual or moral weight. This theme has been cited in Jewish thought as a metaphor for repentance, resilience, and the enduring value of the covenant despite human failings.

== Appearance of the tablets ==
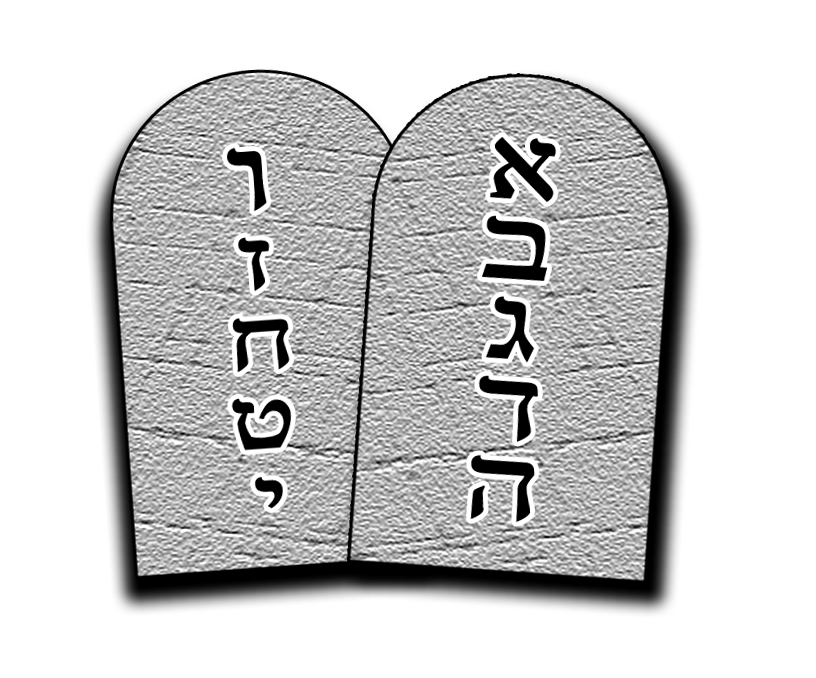
A popular image of the tablets as rounded-off rectangles bears little relationship with religious traditions about their appearance. In this case, the Ten Commandments are represented by the first ten letters of the Hebrew alphabet, which in Hebrew usage may be used interchangeably with the numbers 1–10.

In recent centuries, the tablets have been popularly described and depicted as round-topped rectangles, but this has little basis in religious tradition. According to rabbinic tradition, they were rectangles, with sharp corners, and indeed they are so depicted in the 3rd-century paintings at the Dura-Europos Synagogue and in Christian art throughout the 1st millennium CE, drawing on Jewish traditions of iconography.

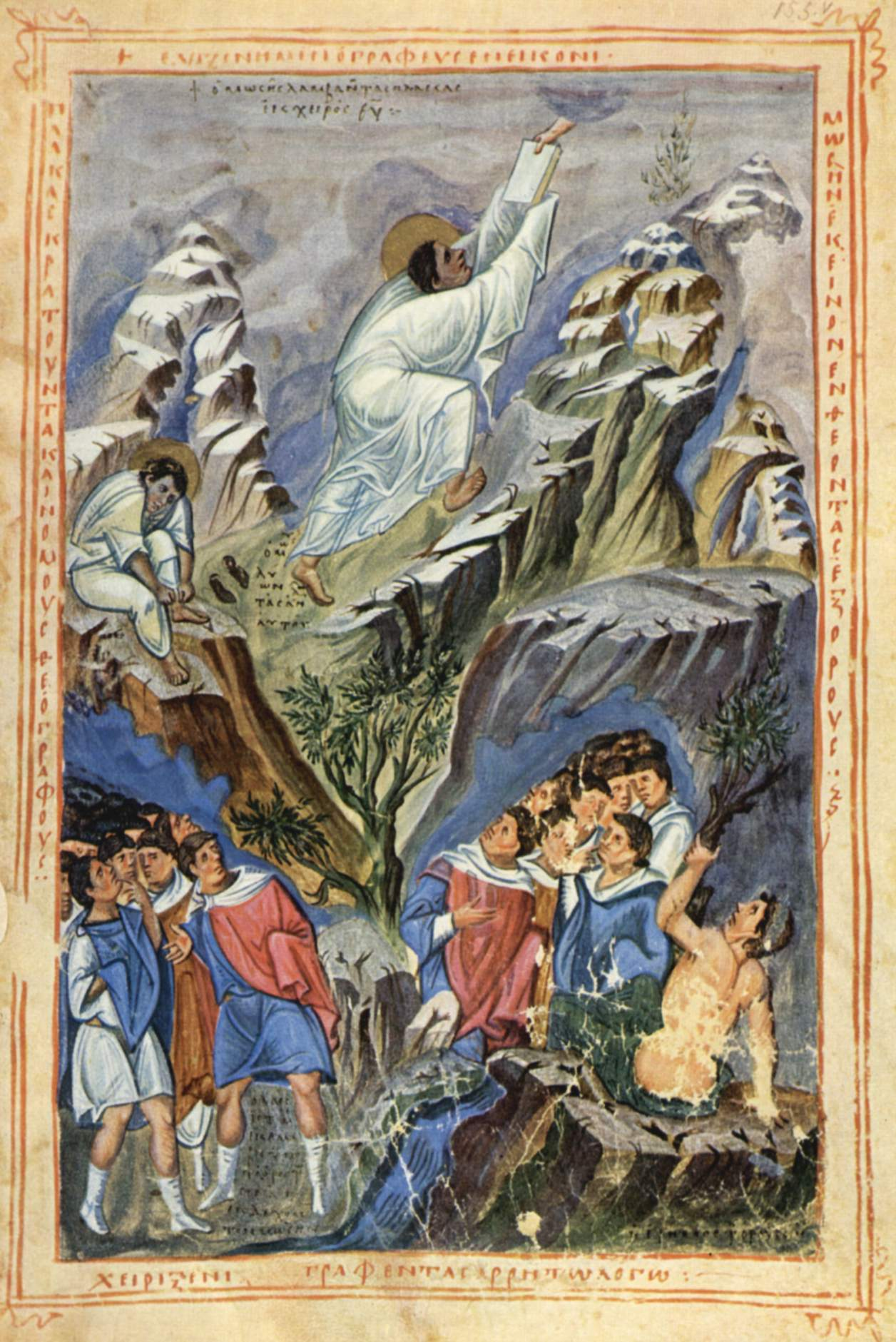
Rectangular tablets passed down by the Hand of God in the 10th century Byzantine Leo Bible.

Depictions of round-topped tablets appear in the Middle Ages, following in size and shape contemporary hinged writing-tablets for taking notes (with a stylus pressing on a layer of wax on the insides). For Michelangelo (1475–1564) and Andrea Mantegna (1431–1506) they still have sharp corners (see gallery), and are about the size found in rabbinic tradition. Later artists, such as Rembrandt (1606–1669), tended to combine the rounded shape with a larger size. While, as mentioned above, rabbinic tradition teaches that the tablets were squared, according to some authorities, the Rabbis themselves approved of rounded depictions of the tablets in replicas – so that the replicas would not exactly match the historical tablets.

According to the Talmud, each tablet was square, six tefachim (approximately 50 centimeters, or 20 inches) wide and high, and more a thicker block than a tablet, at three tefachim (25 centimeters, 10 inches) thick, though they tend to be shown larger in art. (Other Rabbinic sources say they were rectangular rather than square, six tefachim high and three wide and deep.) Also according to tradition, the words were not engraved on the surface, but rather were bored fully through the stone.

== Christian replicas ==
Replicas of the tablets, known as tabots or sellats, are a vital part of the practice of Ethiopian Orthodox Church, which claims that the original Ark of the Covenant is kept in the Church of Our Lady Mary of Zion in Axum.

== In the Quran ==
The Quran states that tablets were given to Moses, without quoting their contents explicitly:

"And We wrote for him on the tablets [something] of all things – instruction and explanation for all things, [saying], 'Take them with determination and order your people to take the best of it. I will show you the home of the defiantly disobedient.'" (Quran 7:145)

These tablets are not broken in the Quran, but picked up later:

"And when Moses returned to his people, angry and grieved, he said, 'How wretched is that by which you have replaced me after [my departure]. Were you impatient over the matter of your Lord?' And he threw down the tablets and seized his brother by [the hair of] his head, pulling him toward him. [Aaron] said, 'O son of my mother, indeed the people overpowered me and were about to kill me, so let not the enemies rejoice over me and do not place me among the wrongdoing people.'" (Quran 7:150).
"And when the anger subsided in Moses, he took up the tablets; and in their inscription was guidance and mercy for those who are fearful of their Lord." (Quran 7:154).

== Modern interpretation ==
Biblical scholars Alan Millard and Daniel I. Block note parallels between the storage of the tablets in the Ark of the Covenant with the practice of other Ancient Near Eastern cultures whose treaty texts were preserved in their temples.

Alternatively, the scholar Thomas Römer argued in 2015 that “clearly… the tablets of the law are a substitute for something else”. He proposed that “the original Ark contained a statue [i.e. a cult image] of Yhwh”, which he specifically identifies as “two betyles (sacred stones), or two cult image statues symbolizing Yhwh and his female companion Ashera or a statue representing Yhwh alone”.

== Gallery ==
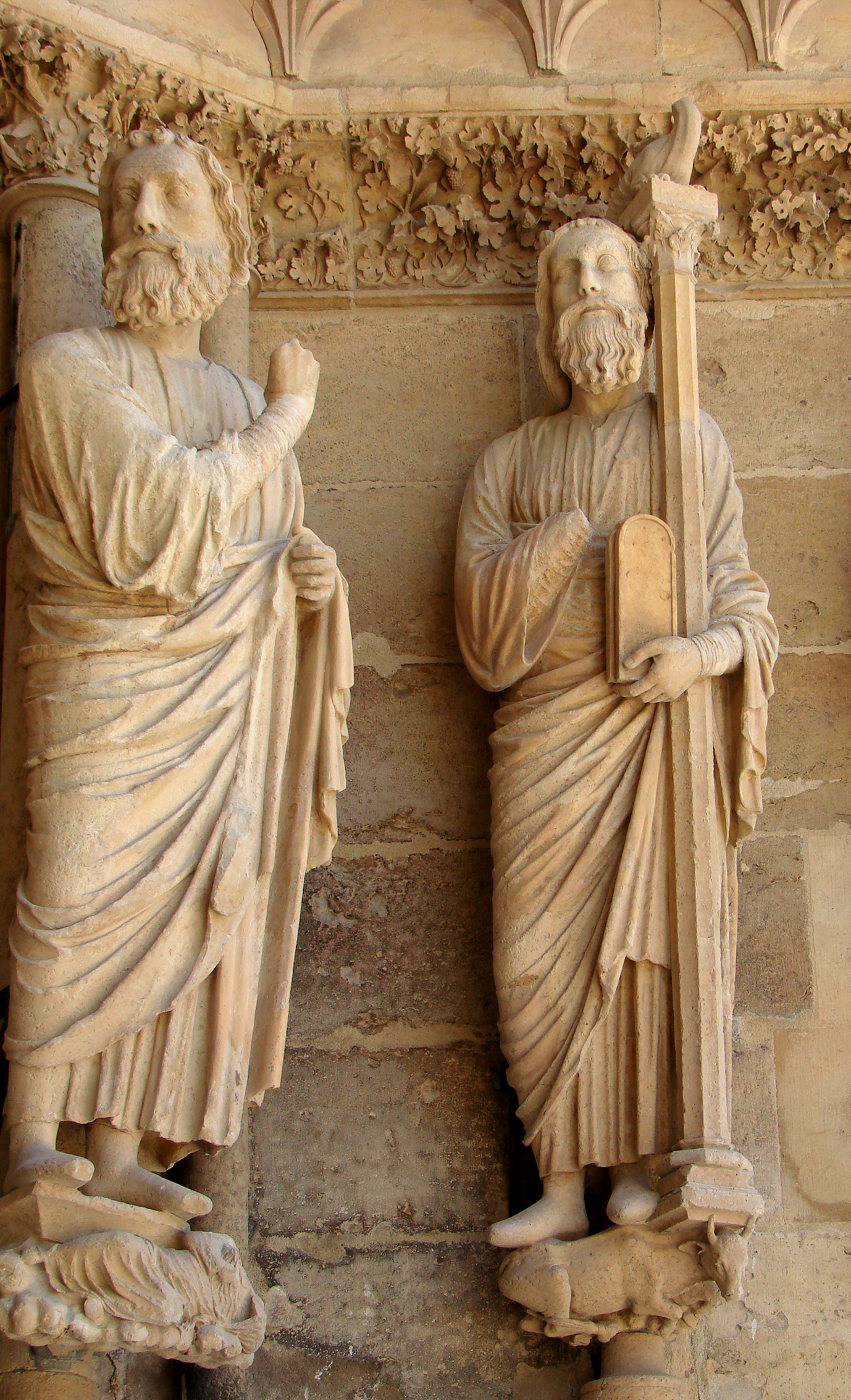
Round corners, 13th century, France

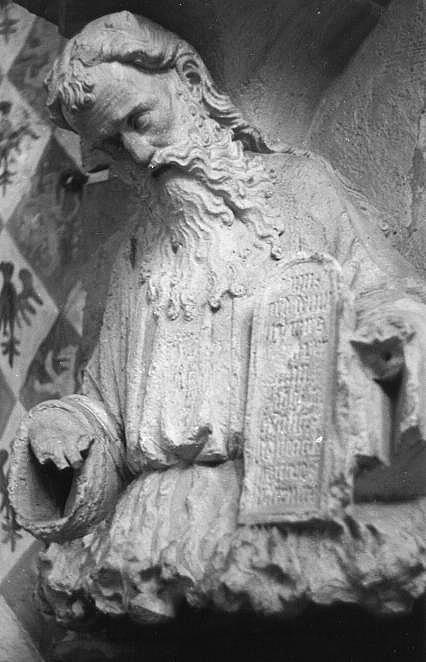
Round corners, c. 1390

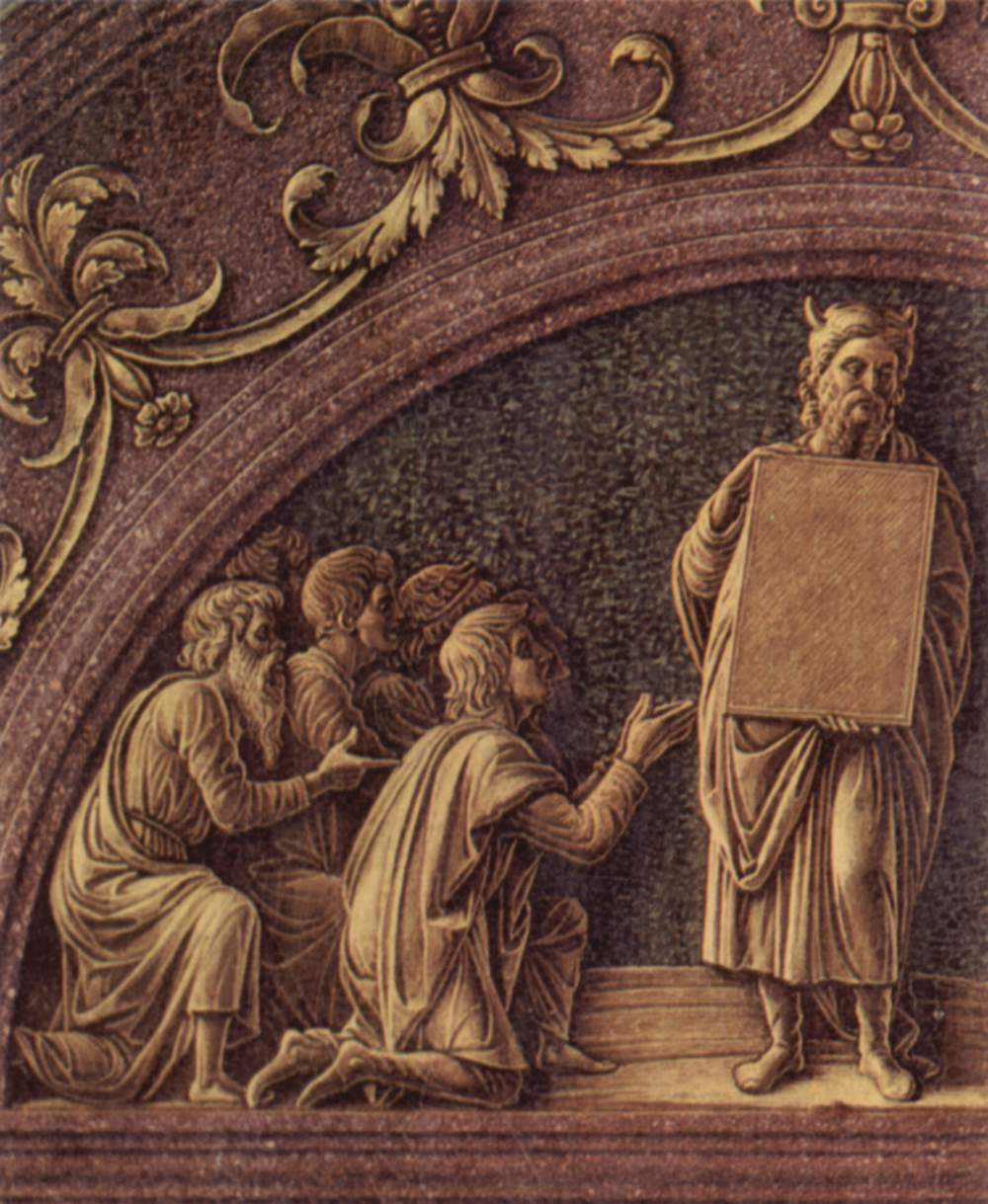
Sharp corners by Andrea Mantegna, c. 1461

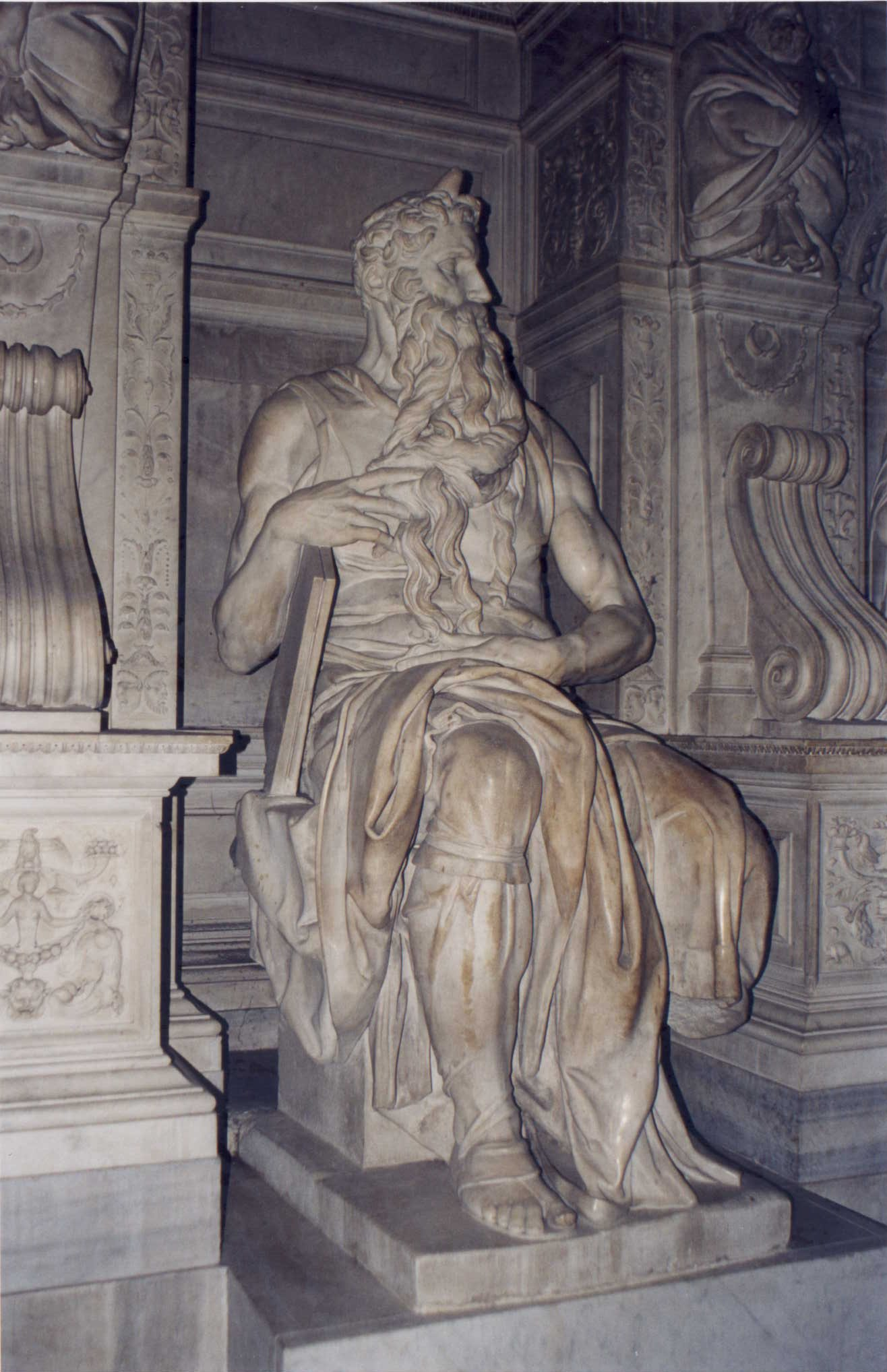
Sharp corners by Michelangelo, c. 1513–1515

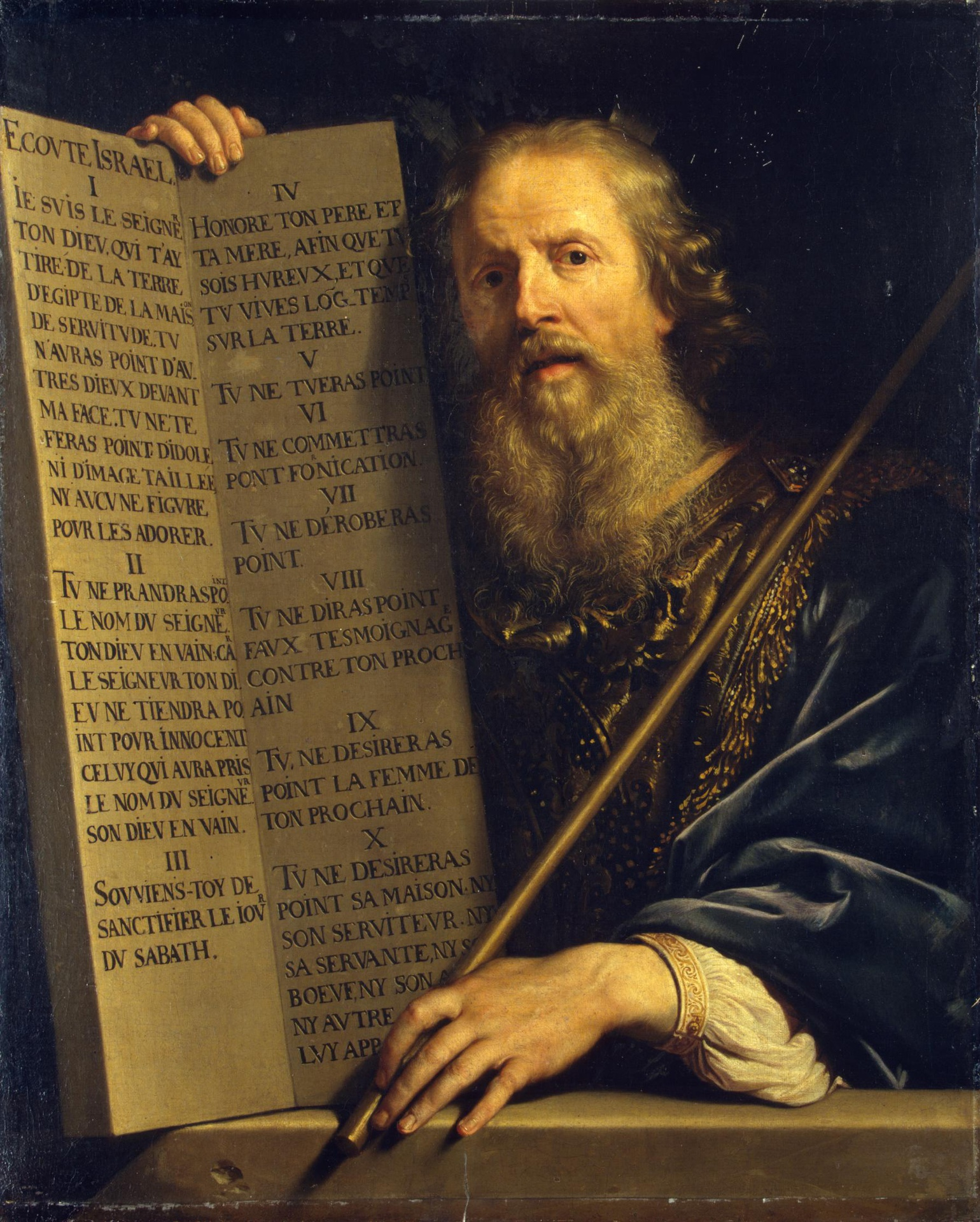
Moses with the Ten Commandments by Philippe de Champaigne, 1648

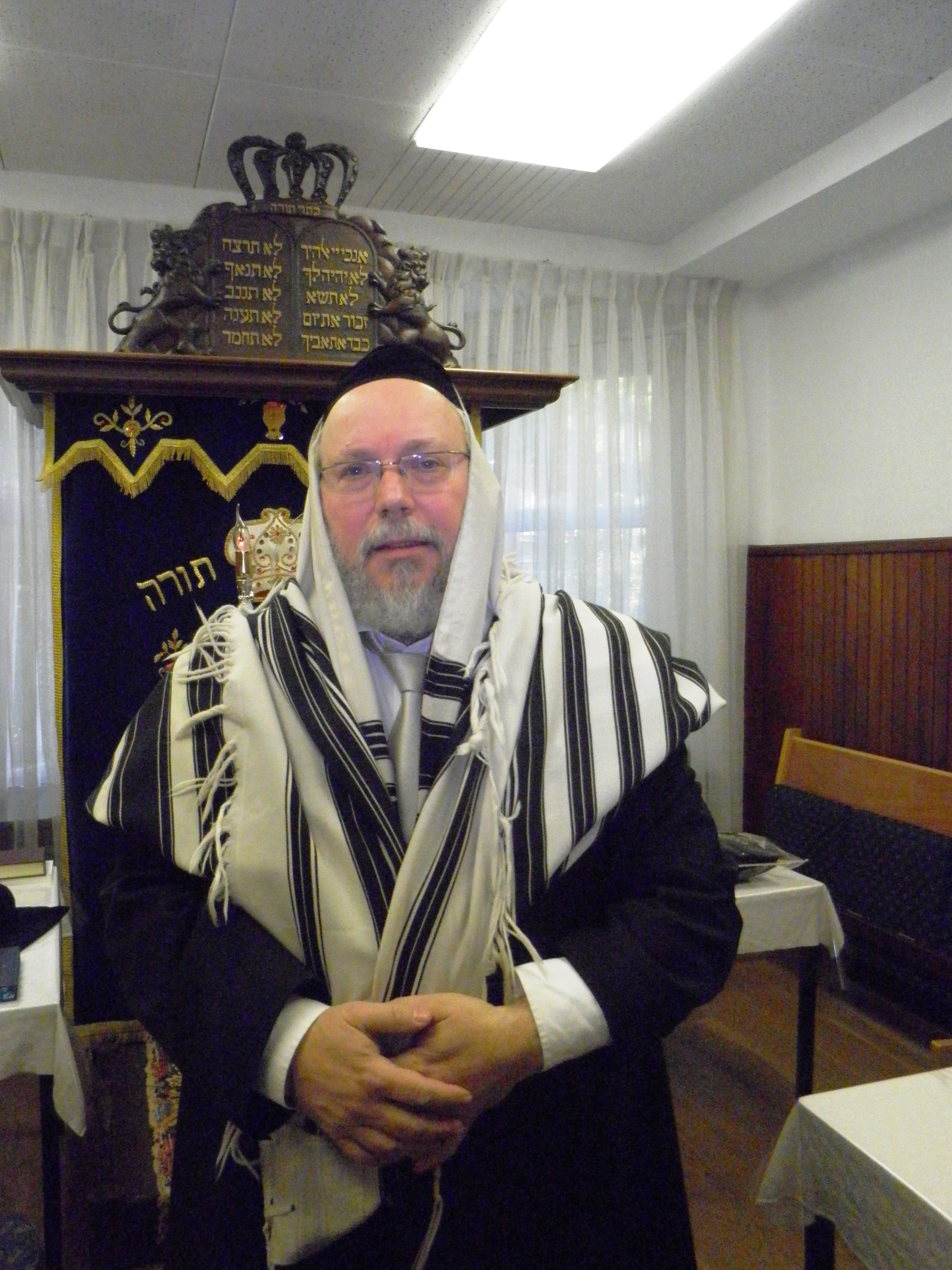
Example behind rabbi Raphael Evers, son of Bloeme Evers-Emden, friend of Anne Frank; the Hebrew lines are incomplete.

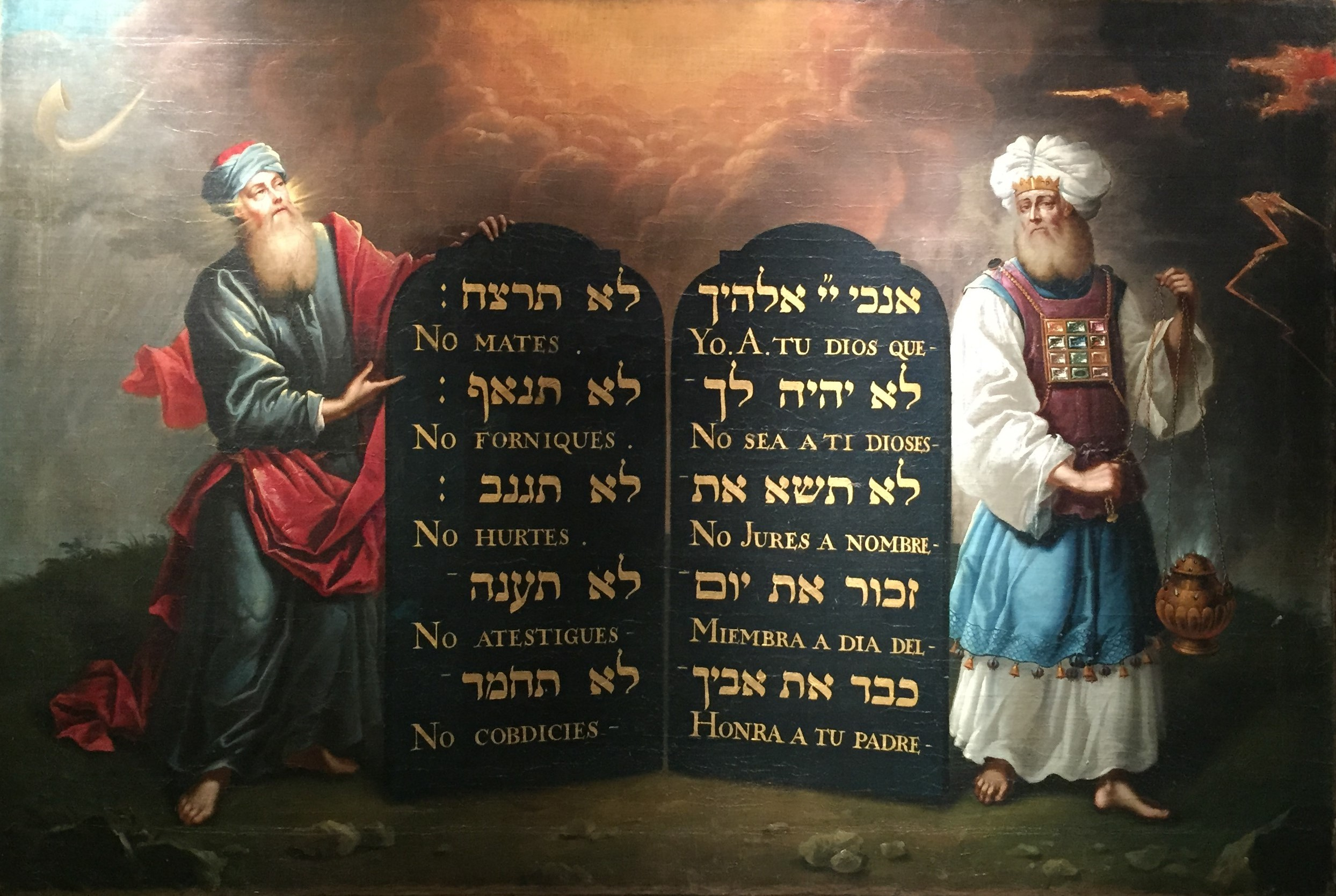
Moses and Aaron with the 10 Commandments, Aron de Chavez 1674.

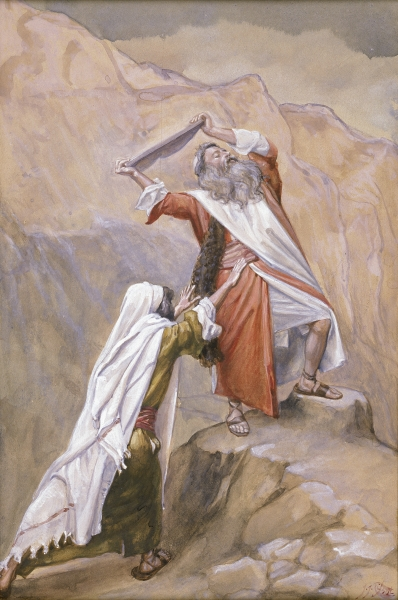
Moses Destroys the Tables of the Ten Commandments, c. 1896-1902, by James Jacques Joseph Tissot

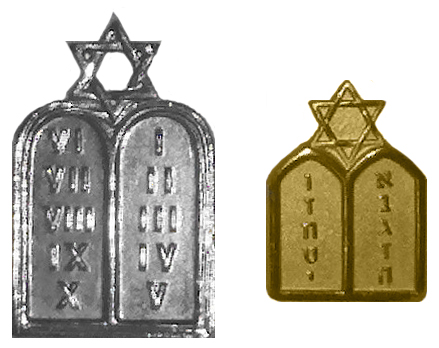
Insignia of Jewish United States Military Chaplains. The version with Roman numerals was used until 1981, when it was replaced by the one with Hebrew letters.

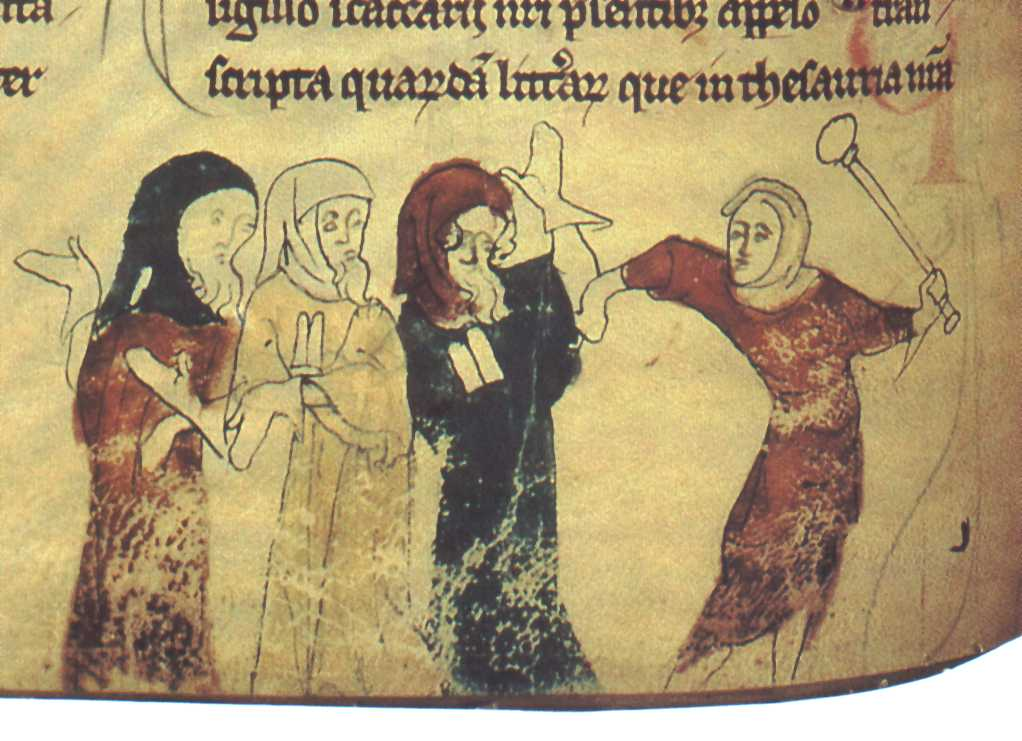
Contemporary depiction of the Edict of Expulsion, depicting the yellow badge in the tablets' likeness that English Jews were forced to wear under the Statute of the Jewry.

== See also ==
- World's largest book, a stone book the pages of which are inscribed stone tablets
