= 16th International Emmy Awards =

1988 awards ceremony

- Date: November 21, 1988
- Location: Sheraton New York Times Square Hotel, New York City
- Hosted by: Phil Collins; Florence Joyner

The 16th Annual International Emmy Awards took place on November 21, 1988 in New York City. The award ceremony, presented by the International Academy of Television Arts and Sciences (IATAS), honors all programming produced and originally aired outside the United States.

== Ceremony ==
The 16th International Emmy Awards took place on November 21, 1988, at the Sheraton New York Times Square Hotel in New York City and awarded programs from Great Britain, Australia, and the Netherlands.

The best drama award went to the United Kingdom for Channel 4's A Very British Coup. The Emmy for best performing arts went to London Weekend Television's The South Bank Show. Great Britain also won the popular arts program award for ITV Yorkshire's The New Statesman. The documentary category went to TROS TV in association with the Belgian broadcasters VRT and AVA, for Anne Frank's Last Seven Months. Australian television won the children's program award for the episode "Captain Johnno" of the series Touch the Sun, produced by the Australian Children's Television Foundation.

The Italian Vittorio Boni, who was director of international relations at RAI, was honored with the Directorate Award for his lifelong broadcast work, including responsibility for the first broadcast of the Olympic Games in Rome. The entrepreneur Goar Mestre was given the Founders' Award in recognition of his work in Latin American television.

== Winners ==
=== Best Drama Series ===
- A Very British Coup (United Kingdom: Channel 4)

=== Best Performing Arts ===
- The South Bank Show (United Kingdom: London Weekend Television)

=== Best Popular Arts ===
- The New Statesman (United Kingdom: ITV Yorkshire)

=== Best Children & Young People ===
- Touch the Sun: Captain Johnno (Australia: ACTF)

=== Best Documentary ===
- The Last Seven Months of Anne Frank (Netherlands: TROS TV/VRT/AVA)
