= Jalda Rebling =

German hazzan

Jalda Rebling (born in Amsterdam, 1951) is a German hazzan.

A year after birth, she and her parents moved to East Germany in 1952. Her parents survived the Holocaust, and Rebling's mother and aunt, Janny Brandes-Brilleslijper, were the first to tell Otto Frank of his daughters' deaths. Her mother Rebekka Brilleslijper, also known as Lin Jaldati, was a well-known singer of Yiddish music while her father, Eberhard Rebling, was a musicologist. Her sister Kathinka Rebling is also a musicologist. In 1987, Rebling helped organize a Yiddish culture festival in Germany, which occurred every year into the 1990s. Rebling herself eventually became one of the best known Yiddish singers in united postwar Germany. She also acted in Yiddish at the Hackischer Hoftheater.

In 1979, the Anne Frank Kindergarten in Berlin had Rebling and her mother perform for the fiftieth anniversary of Anne Frank’s birth; the production was shown on GDR TV and sold as a record, and it became the family’s signature production on tour. They performed it at Yad Vashem in Jerusalem, and Rebling noted that while “we sang in Yiddish, there was also a German song by Paul Dessau. In fact, we brought the first two pieces of German-language music into Yad Vashem.”

Rebling wrote "Yiddish Culture — a Soul Survivor of East Germany," which was included in the book Speaking Out: Jewish Voices from United Germany, published in 1995.

In 2007, she became the first openly lesbian cantor ordained by the Jewish Renewal movement. That year, she also became the first woman to lead the High Holiday services in Lund, Sweden. She also led the first egalitarian service in the traditional Jewish community of Hamburg, Germany. In a Norwegian synagogue of Trondheim, she became the first Jewish female cantor who (together with Rabbi Lynn Feinberg) led Shabbat Services and read the Torah in public.

In 2009 and 2011, she performed during the Program in Jewish Studies’ Week of Jewish Culture at the University of Colorado, Boulder.

She is now the cantor (and one of the founders) of Ohel Hachidusch, "The Tent of Renewal", Berlin's Jewish Renewal community. She lives in Germany with her partner, Anna Adam, and three sons.

== Discography ==
- Ir me quiero, 1988
- Di goldene pawe, 1991
- An alter nign, 1997
- Juden in Deutschland 1250 - 1750, 1993
- Juden im Mittelalter - aus Sepharad und Ashkenas, 1999
