= Eberhard Rebling =

German pianist and anti-fascist (1911-2008)

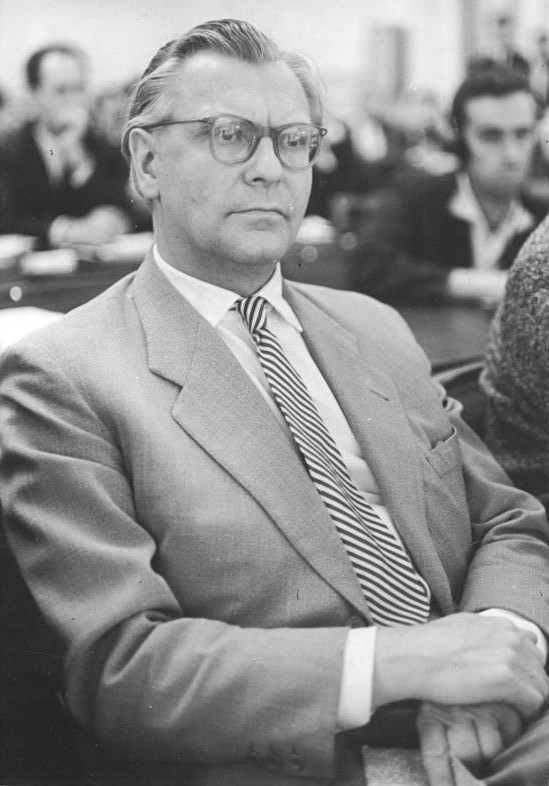
- Rebling in 1963
- Born: 4 December 1911; Berlin
- Died: 2 August 2008; Königs Wusterhausen
- Occupations: Pianist, musicologist, music critic, musician
- Spouse: Lin Jaldati (m. 1942)
- Children: Kathinka Rebling; Jalda Rebling
- Relatives: Janny Brandes-Brilleslijper (sister-in-law)
- Awards: Righteous Among the Nations (Germany, 2007)

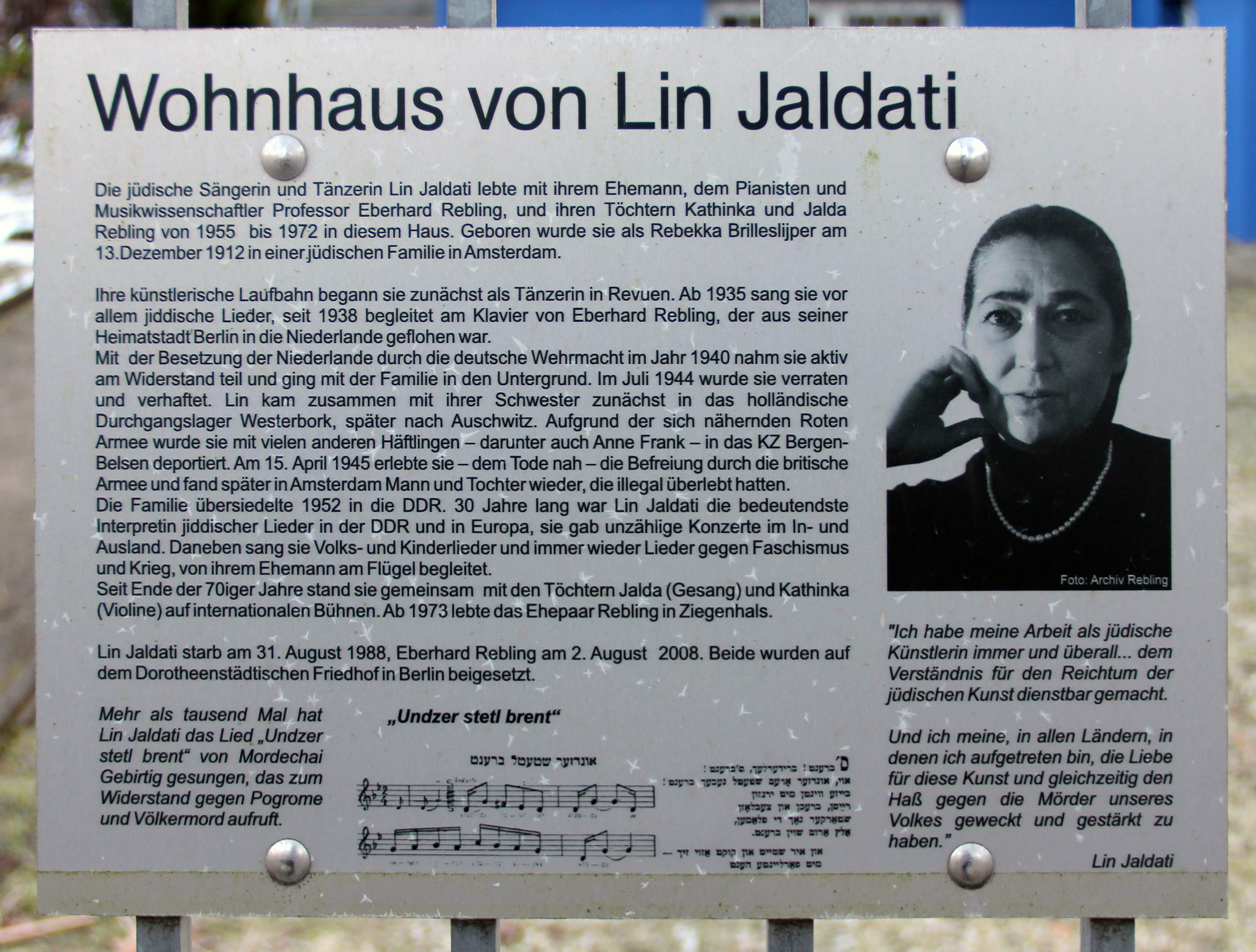
Commemorative plaque at Haus, Puschkinallee 41, in Eichwalde

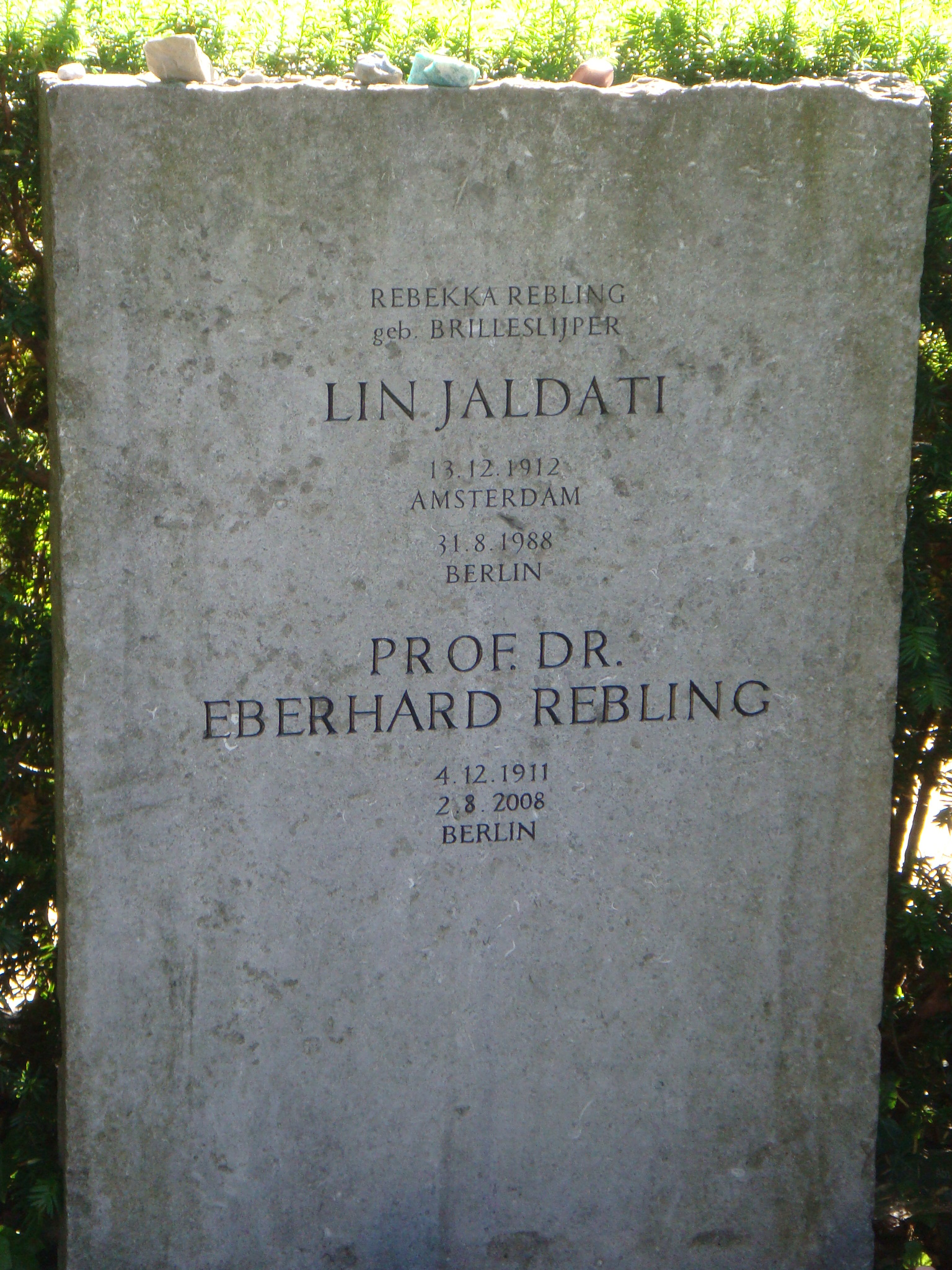
Grave at the Dorotheenstadt Cemetery in Berlin

Eberhard Rebling (4 December 1911 – 2 August 2008) was a German pianist, musicologist and dance scholar as well as an anti fascist.

== Life ==
=== Childhood and young adult ===
Born in Berlin, Rebling, who came from a Prussian officer's family, his father was a Major, began to learn to play the piano at the age of 7. He later received lessons from Lydia Lenz in Berlin-Friedenau and won 1st prize at the "Interpreters" Competition of the German Artists' Association in 1929. He played pieces by Sergei Prokofiev and Ernst Toch. After passing his Abitur at the Goethe-Gymnasium in Berlin-Wilmersdorf, Rebling studied musicology, among others with Friedrich Blume, Curt Sachs and Erich von Hornbostel, as well as German studies and philosophy at the Friedrich-Wilhelms-Universität Berlin. In 1932, he followed Ernst Busch and Hanns Eisler live on stage and got to know the Dutch art historian Leo Balet and subsequently began to study Marxism. He met György Lukács and Andor Gábor. In 1933, he experienced the Reichstag fire in Berlin and voted for the Communist Party of Germany. He finished his studies in 1935 with a dissertation for the Dr. phil. degree under the direction of Arnold Schering on Die soziologischen Grundlagen der Stilwandlung der Musik in Deutschland um die Mitte des 18. Jahrhunderts.

=== During the Second World War ===
In 1936, Rebling emigrated to The Hague due to his opposition to the National Socialism regime. In the same year, the book Die Verbürgerlichung der deutschen Kunst, Literatur und Musik im 18. Jahrhundert, written together with Leo Balet, was published in Strasbourg and Leiden. In 1937, he went on a concert tour to Java and Sumatra as piano accompanist of a small dance company. In the same year, he met his wife, the Jewish actress, dancer and singer Lin Jaldati in The Hague, with whom he performed Yiddish songs in the post-war period.

Rebling took part in Dutch musical life as a pianist, music critic and musicologist. He attracted attention in 1937 with an article about De burgerlijke muziekopvattingen van Willem Mengelberg, which appeared in the monthly magazine Politiek en Cultuur. Between 1938 and 1940, Rebling gave lectures at the folk universities and at the College of Fine Arts in The Hague. He wrote articles for the music magazine Maandblad voor hedendaagse Muziek and the daily newspaper Vooruit.

In early 1943, Rebling bought a house in the Netherlands under a false name and offered shelter to up to 20 Jewish refugees. The hiding place was betrayed in 1944, he was arrested by the Gestapo and sentenced to death. Rebling was able to flee, but most of the Jews living in the house were arrested and deported to concentration camps, among them Lin, who survived the Westerbork transit camp, the Auschwitz concentration camp and Bergen-Belsen concentration camp. They met again in 1945. However, six of the hidden Jews did not survive the Holocaust. On 11 October 2007, Rebling was honoured by the Israeli Holocaust memorial Yad Vashem in Jerusalem with the title "Righteous Among the Nations" for helping the refugees. Rebling met Otto Frank, the father of Anne Frank in 1945. He gave him a copy after the publication of The Diary of a Young Girl. Rebling and his wife toured West Germany, France, Israel and the USA on an Anne Frank programme.

=== After the war ===
After the German occupation of the Netherlands ended, Rebling first became music editor of the daily newspaper of the Dutch Communist Party, De Waarheid. He joined the Dutch Communist Party (CPN) in 1946.

In 1951, Paul Wandel convinced him to come to the GDR. In 1952, he moved with Lin Jaldati and his two daughters Kathinka and Jalda to Berlin (GDR), where he became a member of the Socialist Unity Party of Germany in 1960.

From 1952 to 1959, he was editor-in-chief of the newspaper Musik und Gesellschaft, from 1957 co-editor-in-chief of the music magazine Melodie und Rhythmus and from 1959 professor and rector of the Hochschule für Musik "Hanns Eisler", which was named "Hanns Eisler" on his initiative. Rebling was interested in ballet. After several journeys and his retirement in 1976, he wrote comprehensive works on the dance art of India and Indonesia. In 2002, he handed over his archive to the Academy of Arts, Berlin. In 1959, he accompanied Paul Robeson on the piano. In 1960, he was one of the co-founders of the Singebewegung. In 1976, he performed with Ernst Busch and Gisela May at the Filmtheater Kosmos.

Rebling had been a member of the Volkskammer and the Research Council for Vocational Training in Music at the East-German Ministry of Culture since 1963. He was a member of the Friedensrat der DDR and the Presidential Council of the Cultural Association of the GDR. Until his death, he was a member of the Party of Democratic Socialism and later the Die Linke and lectured at political events on his time and situation during the Second World War. He was a member of the party's "Council of Elders".

Rebling died in Königs Wusterhausen at the age of 96 and is buried on the Dorotheenstadt Cemetery.

His younger daughter Jalda Rebling is a singer, the older Kathinka Rebling is a violinist and music professor.

== Awards ==
- 1929 1. Preis beim "Interpretenwettbewerb des Deutschen Künstlerverbandes" in Berlin
- 1954 Nationalpreis der DDR III. Klasse für Kunst und Literatur (im Kollektiv des Beethoven-Films)
- 1956 Ehrennadel der Gesellschaft für Deutsch-Sowjetische Freundschaft in Gold
- 1958 Theodor-Fontane-Preis des Bezirkes Potsdam (with Lin Jaldati)
- 1959 Ernst-Moritz-Arndt-Medaille
- 1960 Friedensmedaille
- 1961 Patriotic Order of Merit in Bronze
- 1971 Artur-Becker-Medaille in Gold
- 1972 Vaterländischer Verdienstorden in Gold
- 1976 Ehrenmedaille des Komitees der Antifaschistischen Widerstandskämpfer in der DDR
- 1976 Ehrenspange zum Vaterländischen Verdienstorden in Gold
- 1977 Ehrennadel des Verband der Komponisten und Musikwissenschaftler der DDR in Gold
- 1979 Medaille des World Peace Counciles für den hervorragenden Beitrag für Frieden und Völkerfreundschaft
- 1981 Star of Peoples' Friendship in Silver
- 1985 Lessing-Preis der DDR
- 1986 Order of Karl Marx
- 2007 Righteous Among the Nations

== Publications ==
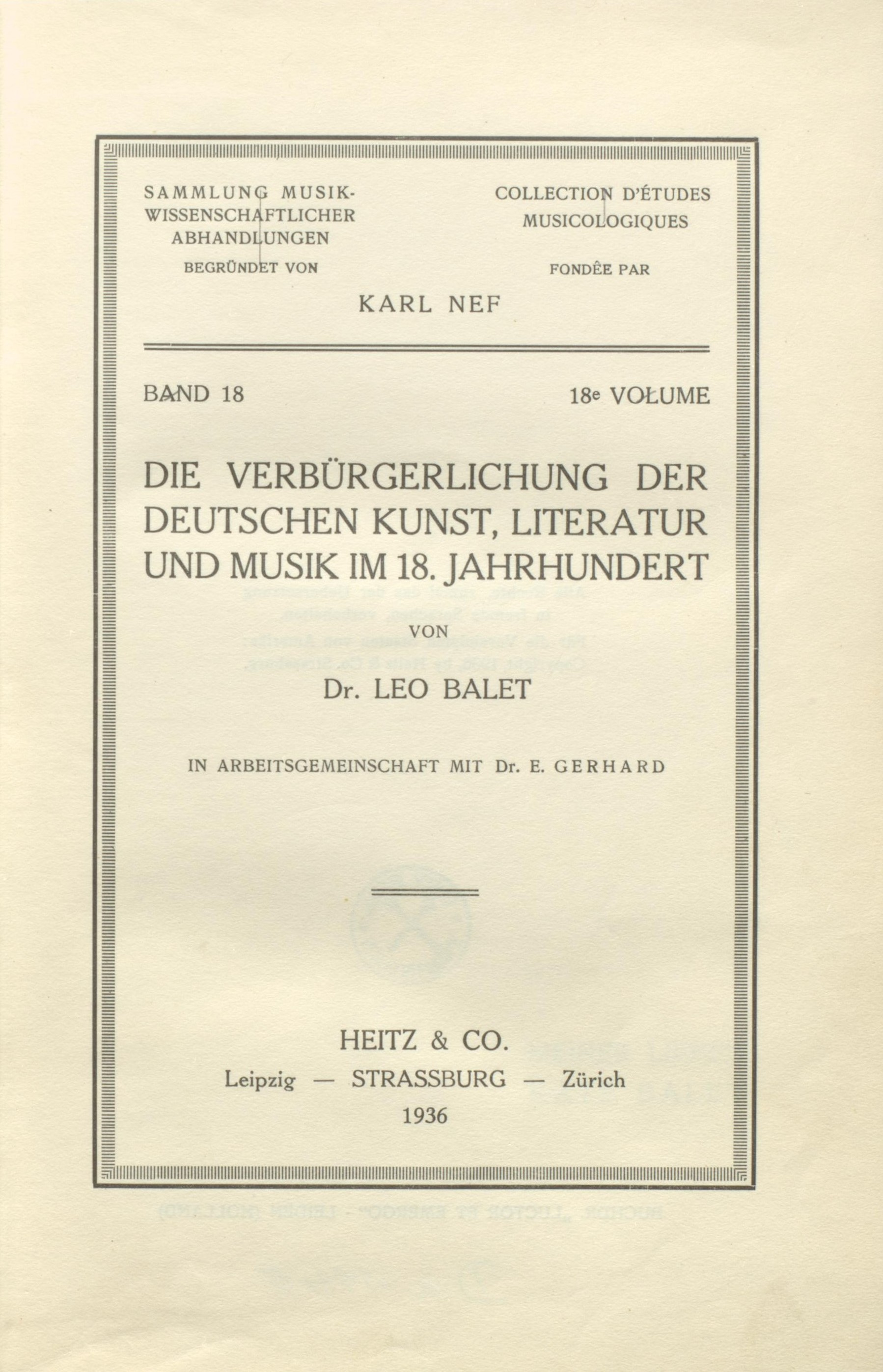
Die Verbürgerlichung der deutschen Kunst, Literatur und Musik im 18. Jahrhundert (1936)

- Die soziologischen Grundlagen der Stilwandlung der Musik im 18. Jahrhundert, 1935 (dissertation)
- Leo Balet and E. Gerhard [pseudonym of Eberhard Rebling]: Die Verbürgerlichung der deutschen Kunst, Literatur und Musik im 18. Jahrhundert
  - 1st edition: Heitz, Straßburg/Leiden, 1936.
  - 2nd edition by Gert Mattenklott: Ullstein, Frankfurt/Berlin/Vienna 1973; 2nd extended edition, 1979
  - 3rd edition: (Fundus-Reihe 61/62). Verlag der Kunst, Dresden 1979
- Revolutionnaire Liedern uit Nederlands Verleden, Amsterdam 1938
- Den lustelijken Mai – Musik im 17. Jahrhundert in den Niederlanden, Amsterdam 1948
- Een Eeuw Danskunst in Nederland, Querido, Amsterdam 1950
- Johann Sebastian Bach en de overwinning van de barok, Arnhem 1951
- Ballett Gestern und Heute, Henschel, Berlin 1956
- Hans Joachim Moser, Eberhard Rebling (eds.): Robert Schumann, aus Anlass seines 100. Todestages, Breitkopf und Härtel, 1956
- Musikbücherei für Jedermann – "Ballett", Reclam, Leipzig 1963
- with Lin Jaldati: Es brennt, Brüder, es brennt. Jiddische Lieder, Berlin 1966
- Ballett heute, Henschel, Berlin; Heinrichshofen, Bremerhaven 1970
- Tanz der Völker, Berlin, Henschel; Bremerhaven, Heinrichshofen 1972
- Ballettfibel, Henschel, Berlin 1974
- Marius Petipa, Meister des klassischen Balletts, Heinrichshofen, Wilhelmshaven 1980
- Das grosse Ballettlexikon. Ein Führer durch die Welt des Balletts von A bis Z, 4th edition. Heyne, Munich 1980, ISBN 3-453-41434-9
- Ballett A–Z, 4th edition. Henschelverlag Kunst und Gesellschaft, Berlin 1980
  - Ballett A–Z. Ein Führer durch die Welt des Balletts, 4th edition. Heinrichshofen, Wilhelmshaven 1980, ISBN 3-7959-0075-1
  - Ballett A–Z, 5th edition, Henschelverlag Kunst und Gesellschaft, Berlin 1984
- Die Tanzkunst Indiens, Henschel, Berlin 1981; also Heinrichshofen, Wilhelmshaven 1982, ISBN 3-7959-0348-3
- Die Tanzkunst Indonesiens, Noetzel, Wilhelmshaven 1989, ISBN 3-7959-0552-4
- with Lin Jaldati: "Sag nie, du gehst den letzten Weg!" Lebenserinnerungen 1911 bis 1988, Der Morgen, Berlin 1986, ISBN 3-371-00010-9; also (Sammlung 1). BdWi-Verlag, Marburg 1995, ISBN 3-924684-55-3.
- Eberhard Rebling in conversation with Peter Schleuning: "Entstehung und Wirkung des frühen Versuchs einer marxistischen Kunst- und Musikhistoriografie", in Wolfgang Martin Stroh, Günter Mayer (ed.): Musikwissenschaftlicher Paradigmenwechsel? Zum Stellenwert marxistischer Ansätze in der Musikforschung, BIS, Oldenburg 2000, ISBN 3-8142-0726-2, pp. 89–97, urn:urn:nbn:de:gbv:715-oops-6429:{{{2}}}

== Compositions ==
- Vier Nigunim, 1943; printed: Vier Nigunim, Ostjüdische Volksmelodien für Klavier zu zwei Händen (Coll. Litolff No. 5261). Peters, Leipzig; Litolff, Leipzig 1960, DNB-IDN 100532364X (score).
- Für Kathinka, 12 Kinderstücke (1960).

== Recording ==
- Lin Jaldati singt Lieder von Louis Fürnberg, Hanns Eisler and Mordechaj Gebirtig. Piano: Eberhard Rebling, 1957–1961, Hastedt 2008.

== Radio ==
- Ed Stuhler: Lin und Eberhard – Geschichte einer großen Liebe , Deutschlandfunk, 8 February 2013.

== Filmography ==
- Friedrich Schiller, documentary, DDR 1955, director: Max Jaap
- Lin Jaldati singt, short documentary, DDR 1962, director: Gerhard Jentsch

== Archives ==
- "Eröffnung des Lin-Jaldati- und Eberhard-Rebling-Archivs". adk.de (in German). Academy of Arts, Berlin. 16 December 2012. Archived from the original on 31 October 2012. "Program leaflet" PDF 905 kB (in German)
