= Lin Jaldati =

Dutch-German singer and actor

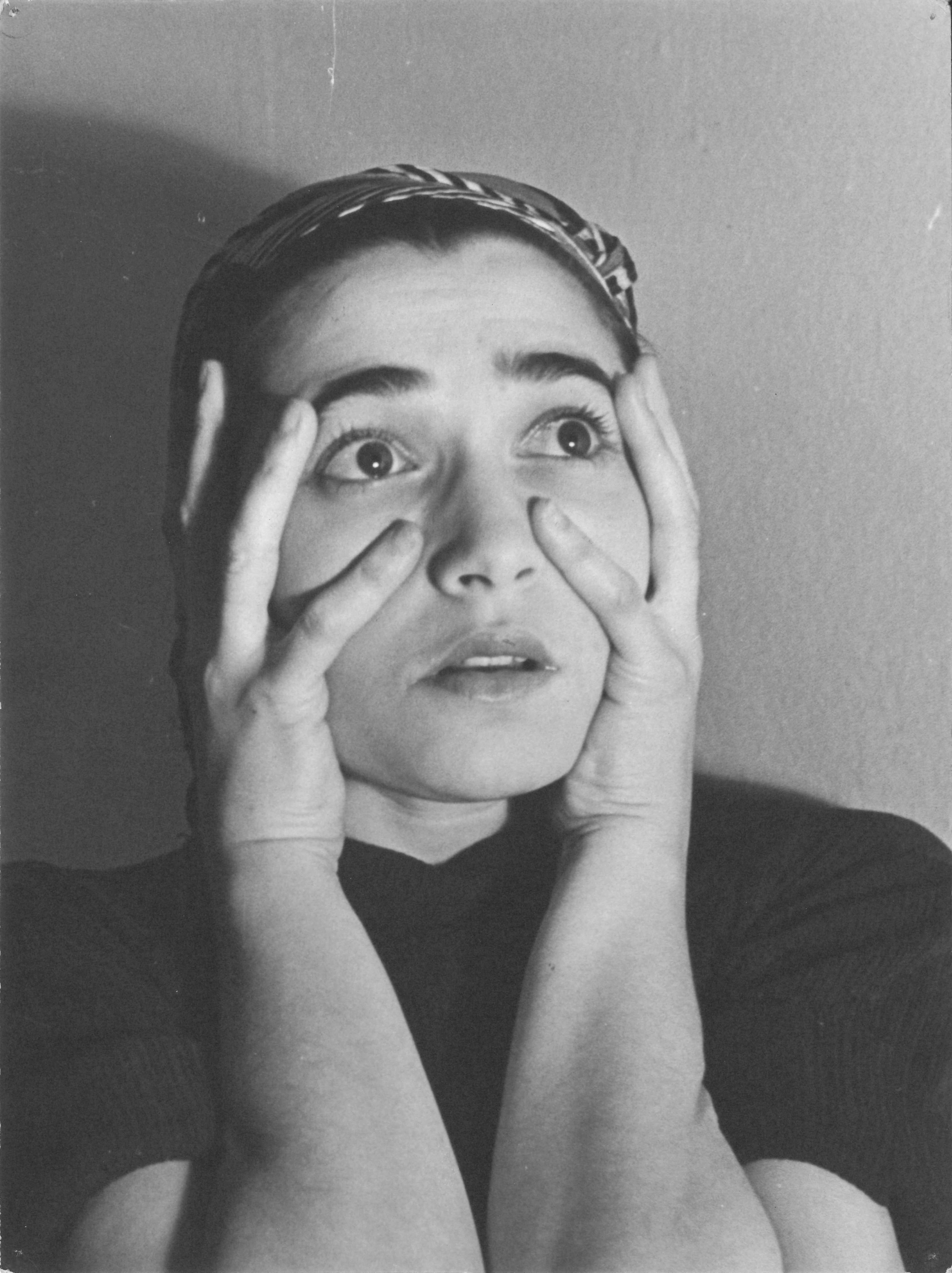
- Lin Jaldati (ca. 1938)
- Born: Rebekka Brilleslijper; 13 December 1912; Amsterdam, Netherlands
- Died: 31 August 1988 (aged 75); East Berlin, East Germany
- Occupation: Singer
- Spouse: Eberhard Rebling (m. 1942)
- Children: Kathinka Rebling; Jalda Rebling
- Relatives: Janny Brandes-Brilleslijper (sister)

Lin Jaldati, known to her family as Lientje, (born Rebekka Brilleslijper; 13 December 1912 – 31 August 1988) was a Dutch-born, East German-based Yiddish singer. She was a Holocaust survivor, and one of the last people to see Anne Frank. After the war she published an article, "Memories of Anne Frank," in Joachim Hellwig and Günther Deicke's book A Diary for Anne Frank. A self-professed socialist, she performed in Yiddish in the Soviet Union, China, North Korea and Vietnam from the 1950s to the 1970s.

== Life and career ==
Lin Jaldati was born as Rebekka Brilleslijper on 13 December 1912 in Amsterdam, Netherlands, the eldest of three children of Fijtje (née Gerritse) and Joseph Brilleslijper. Her younger sister was Janny Brandes-Brilleslijper. Her sister called her Lientje.

In Amsterdam, she learned Yiddish in order to participate in the culture club of the Jewish immigrants. From 1930, she danced in the Dutch National Ballet and from 1934, she participated in the Revue of Bob Peters and the Bouwmeeser Revue. After the start of the Spanish Civil War in 1936, she joined the Communist Party of the Netherlands. In 1937, she met the pianist Eberhard Rebling (1911–2008), who had emigrated from Berlin, and they married in 1942. From 1938 onward, she gave her own evenings with him featuring Yiddish songs, including dance performances. She also studied dance with Olga Preobrazhenskaya in Paris and singing with Eberhard E. Wechselmann in The Hague.

During World War II, she was deported to the Bergen-Belsen concentration camp and the Auschwitz concentration camp, and she survived. She was one of the last people to see Anne Frank.

She continued to pursue a Yiddish singing career. After the war, she sang along with her husband Eberhard Rebling accompanying on piano. In 1952 the couple emigrated from the Netherlands with their two daughters, to East Berlin. In the GDR, she was the only interpreter of Yiddish music for a long time and she often performed on the East German radio. She also performed in Moscow in the late 1950s. By 1965, she performed in China and North Korea. She performed in Indonesia, Thailand, India and Vietnam in the 1970s.

Jaldati was married to Eberhard Rebling, a German pianist and musicologist who emigrated to the Netherlands in 1936. They had two daughters, Kathinka Rebling (born 1941) and Jalda Rebling (born 1951). From 1952, they resided in East Berlin. She was a proponent of socialism.

== Death ==
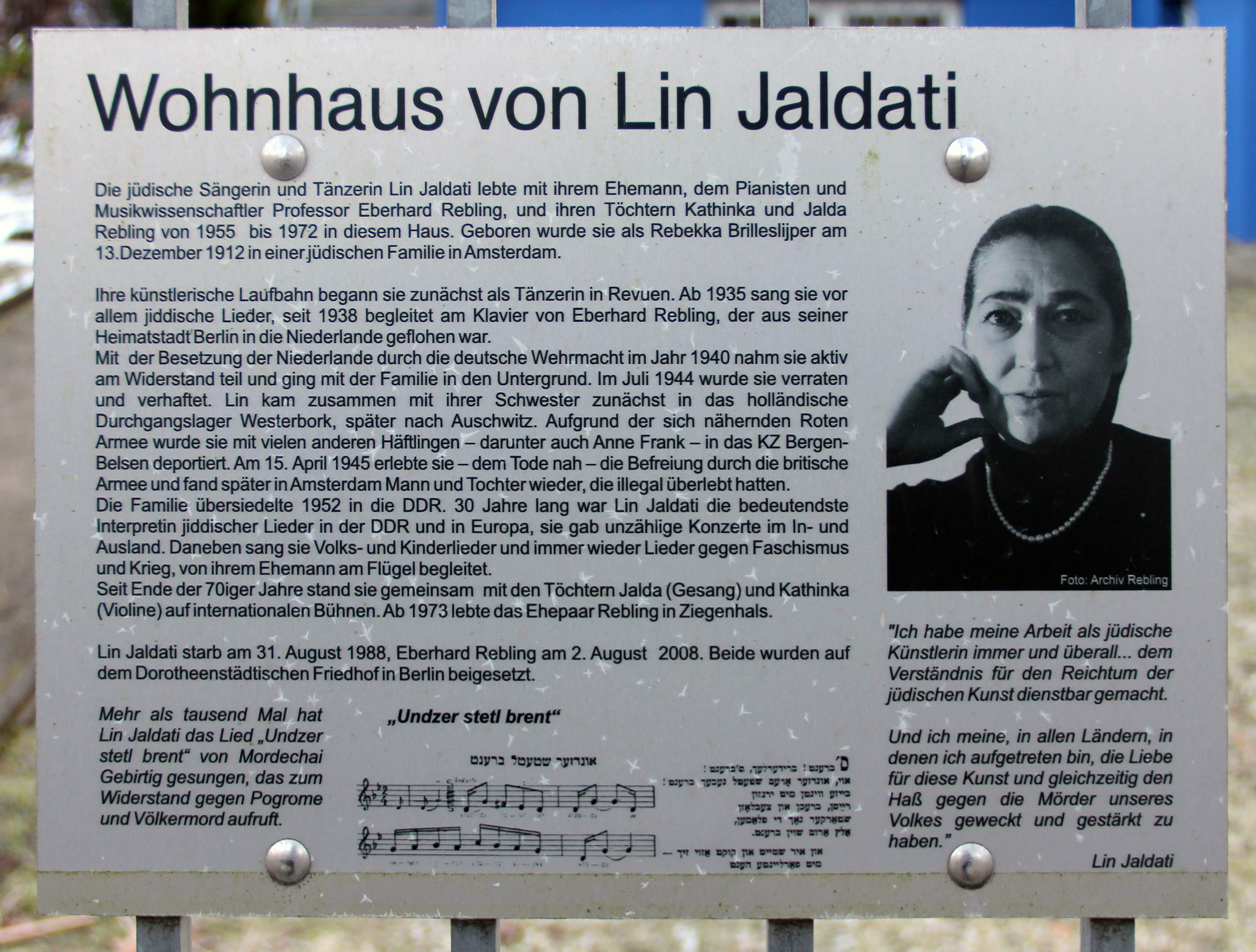
Memorial plaque

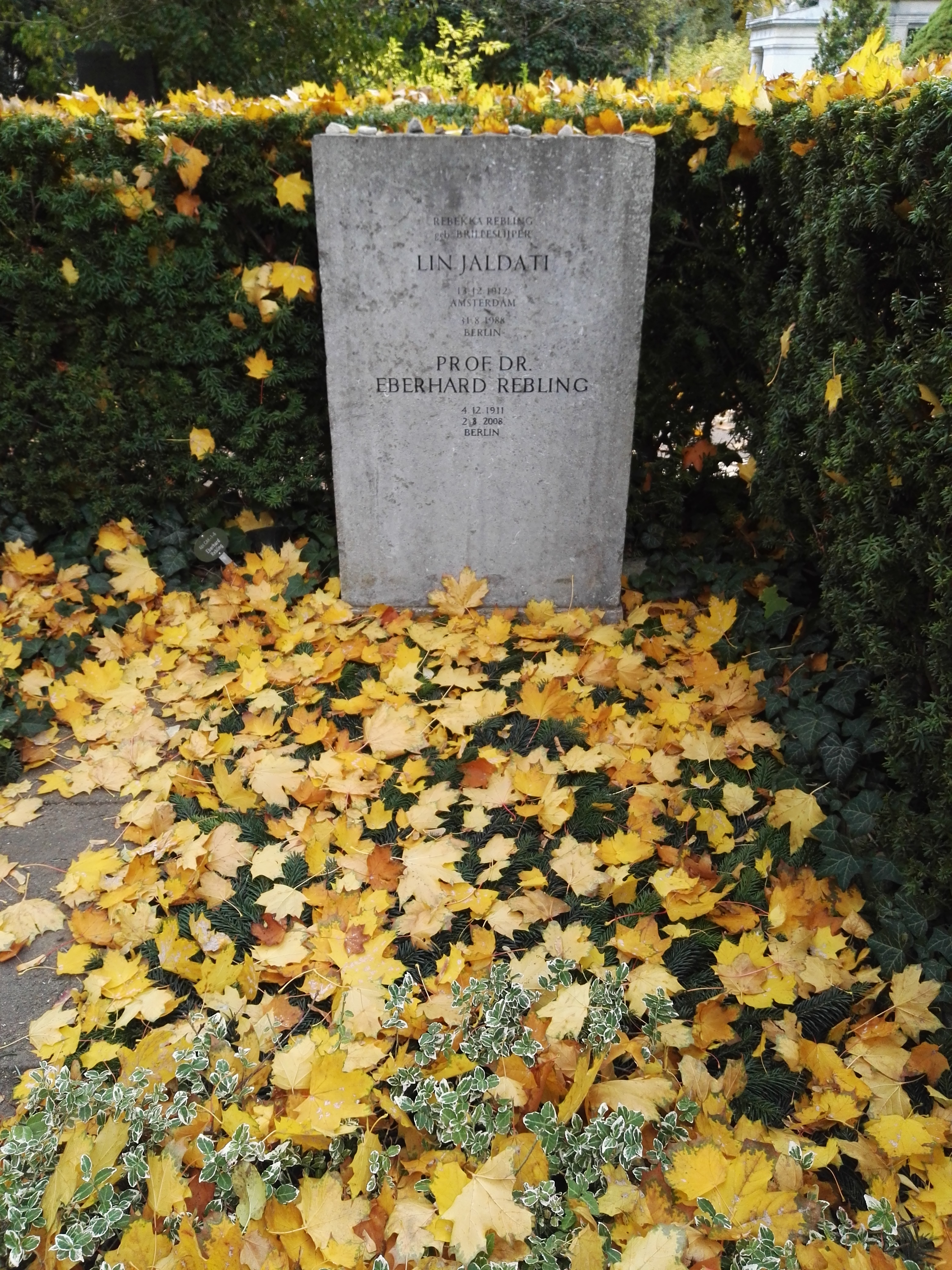
Memorial headstone of Jaldati and her husband

Lin Jaldati died on 31 August 1988 in East Berlin, Germany.
