= Raphael Evers =

Dutch rabbi

Rabbi Dr. Raphael Evers
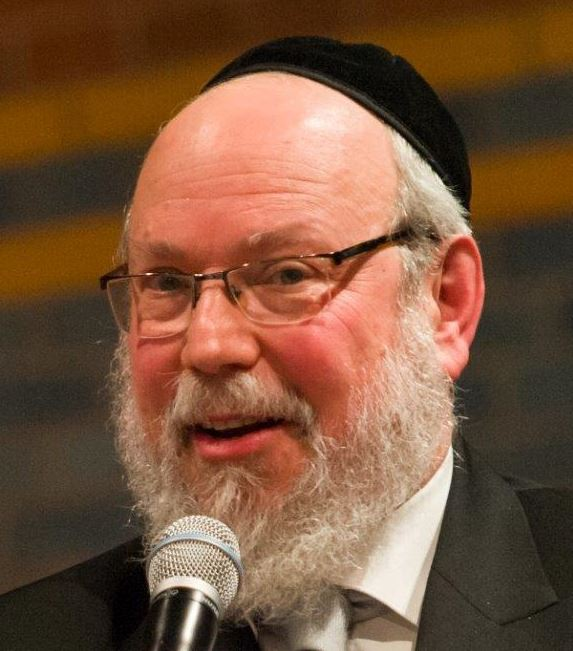

Personal life
- Born: Raphael Evers; May 8, 1954 (age 72) Amsterdam
- Spouse: Channa
- Children: 10
- Parent: (father); Bloeme Evers-Emden (mother)
- Education: University of Amsterdam

Religious life
- Religion: Judaism

Jewish leader
- Residence: Israel

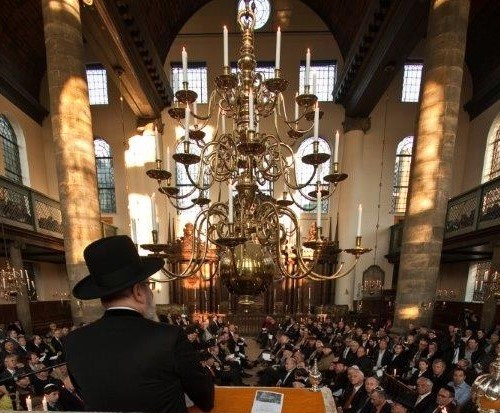
Rabbi Evers speaking at the ancient Portuguese synagogue in honor of King Willem Alexander

Raphael Evers (Hebrew: רפאל אוורס; born May 8, 1954) is a Dutch-Israeli Orthodox rabbi. He was a rabbi in the Netherlands and Germany. On August 1, 2021, he emigrated to Israel (Hebrew: עֲלִיָּה, romanized: aliyah).

== Family ==
Evers was born in Amsterdam, and grew up in Amsterdam-West. He is the son of Dutch-Jewish parents, Hans Evers and Bloeme Evers-Emden (1926-2016). His mother was deported from Westerbork to Auschwitz in September 1944 on the same train as Anne Frank, whom she had known in Amsterdam. Evers-Emden survived the war, and later published four books detailing her research on Dutch Jewish children hidden during the war.

== Rabbinic ordinations (Semikhah) ==
Evers received Semkihah for Dayanut from the following Rabbi's: Rabbi Jonathan Sacks, Dayan Chanoch Ehrentreu, Rabbi Meir Just, Rabbi Zalman Nechemia Goldberg, Rabbi Moshe Halberstam and Rabbi Aryeh Ralbag.

In addition, Evers received regular Semikhot from a variety of Rabbi's from different streams within Orthodox Judaism.

Evers received Rabbinic ordination from:

- the Chief Rabbi's of Israel Rabbi Avraham Shapira and Rabbi Mordechai Eliyahu
- Rabbi Meir Just (the Netherlands)
- Rabbi Zalman Nechemia Goldberg (Jerusalem)
- Rabbi Moshe Halberstam (Sanz - Jerusalem)
- Rabbi Moshe Halberstam (Bobov - Antwerp)
- Rabbi Yacov Chaim Sarna (Jerusalem)
- Rabbi Dov Lior (Kiryat Arba)
- Rabbi Avraham Kopschitz (Jerusalem)
- Rabbi Avraham David Rosenthal (Jerusalem) and
- Rabbi Elchonon Halpern (London).

Evers is one of the very few post-Holocaust recipients of the highest Dutch Semikhah, the so-called Moreh degree.

== Rabbinate ==
In addition to his position of Chief Rabbi of Dusseldorf, he also served as a Dayan in the Beth Din of the ORD (Germany) and the European Beth Din.

Since 1990 and until his departure in 2016 to Germany, Evers served as the rabbi of the Nederlands Israëlitisch Kerkgenootschap (Dutch Israelite Religious Community). He also served 26 years as the dean of the Nederlands Israëlitisch Seminarium (Dutch Israelite Seminary), where Dutch rabbis and Jewish teachers are trained. Among other positions, he served as the Rabbi of Rotterdam from 1992 until 2010 and as the Rabbi of the Kehillas Ja'akow synagogue in Amsterdam.

Evers finished two Master degrees in Clinical Psychology and Conflictuology (1981) and in Tax Law (1985), both at the University of Amsterdam. He is known for his encyclopedic knowledge on almost all facets of Judaism.

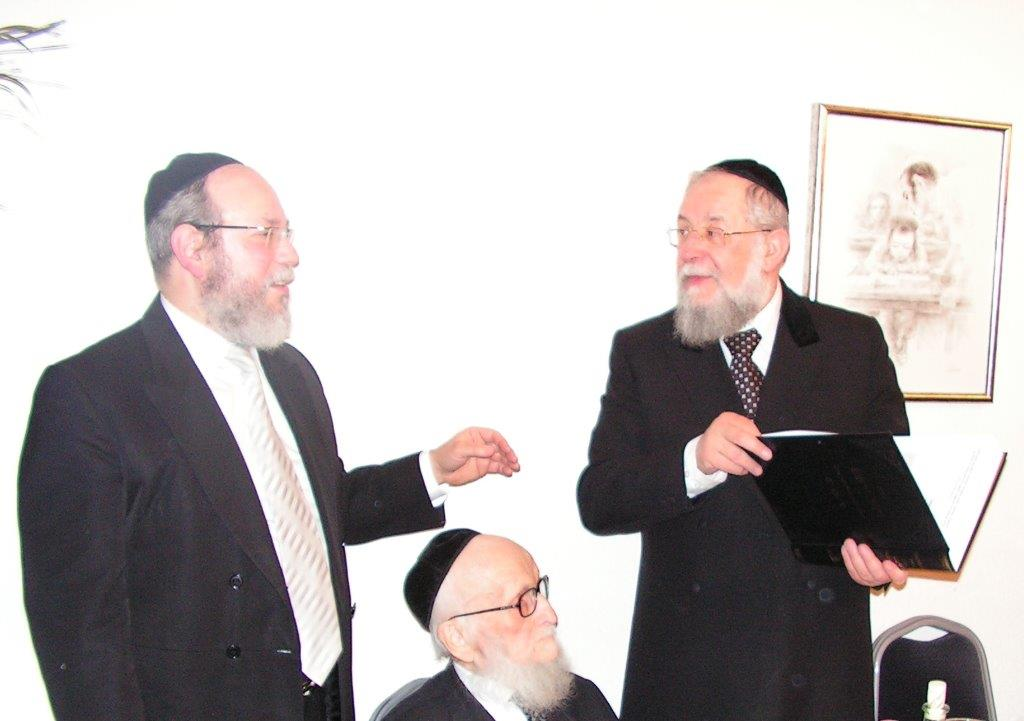
Rabbi Evers presenting his first Responsa book to Chief Rabbi Lau and Chief Rabbi Just

== Additional functions and activities ==
Evers is an honorary member of the Conference of European Rabbis (CER).

During his position at the NIK, Evers appeared frequently in Dutch and international press (Radio, Newspapers and TV) to advocate and explain about Judaism, Israel and issues related to the Jewish community.

As a result of his work for promoting cultural understanding between the Dutch Jewish and the Muslim Moroccan community in the Netherlands, he was awarded a place in the Golden Book of Moroccan Judaism and later received an official award of Gratitude from King Mohammad VI of Morocco.

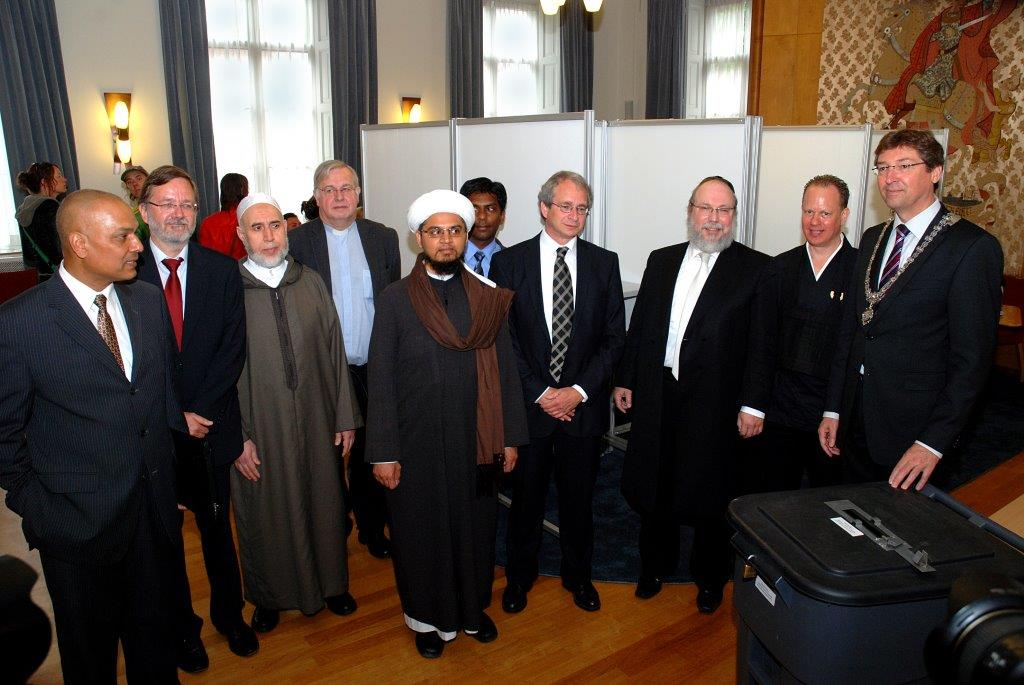
Rabbi Evers at an interfaith Panel with representatives of other religions

Evers served in a large number of voluntary board positions throughout his career, including the boards of Jewish youth organizations, schools, museums and general professional NGO's. He also participated in many national and international inter-faith panels and initiatives like the Forum A to Z, encouraging the Dutch government to fight low literacy.

== Antisemitism ==
After the murder of Theo van Gogh on November 2, 2004, Evers presented, alongside representatives of Christian and Muslim communities, a Samenlevingscontract (Cohabitation Agreement) to the President of the Dutch House of Representatives.

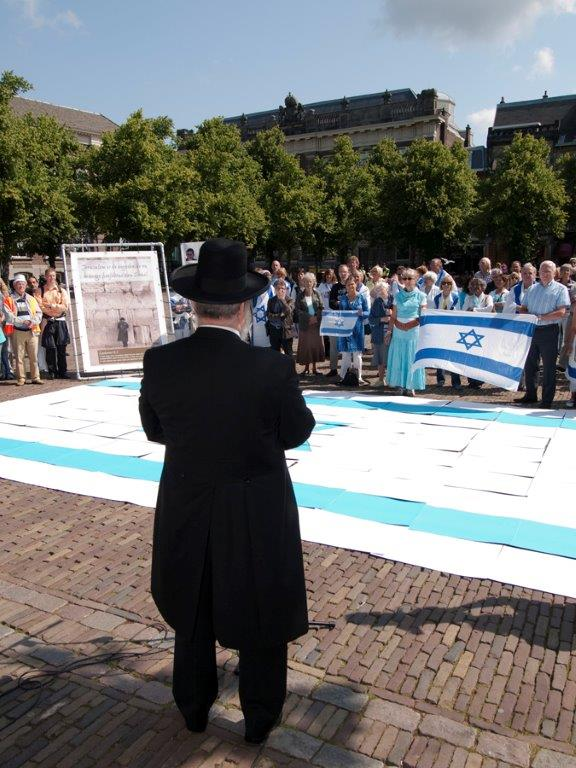
Rabbi Evers speaking at a Pro-Israel Rally in the Netherlands

He has also spoken out on the increasing anti-Semitism displayed by Dutch Muslim residents of Moroccan and Turkish descent, allowing himself and his mother to be filmed on the subject by French television. In 2010, his son Bentzion Evers told the press that he was planning to move to Israel because of anti-Semitism, and that his father was also planning to leave the Netherlands after his retirement. Six of Evers' children already left the country, before Raphael Evers and his wife Channa eventually moved to Israel.

== Publications ==
Evers published 8 Hebrew-language volumes of his Responsa "Weshav Werafa" documenting Halakhic questions he was asked to rule on as Posek and Dayan

He also published more than 30 books in Dutch on a variety of Jewish topics, among others:

- Tsedaka het bijbelse tiende (on giving charity)
- Kaddiesj: Theoretische en praktische aspecten van het Kaddiesj-gebed (lit.: "Kaddish: Theoretical and practical aspects of the Kaddish prayer")
- Aan tafel bij de rabbijn (lit.: "Sharing meals with the rabbi"—on eating and drinking from a Biblical perspective)
- Talmoedisch denken (lit.: "Talmudic thinking"—on how to interpret the rules of the Talmud)
- Oude wijn in nieuwe zakken (lit.: "Old wine in new jugs"—on current events in the Jewish community)
- Tijd van leven (lit.: "Time of living"—on the 24-hour economy)
- Op het leven! (lit.: "On life!"—on medical-ethical topics out of a Jewish perspective)
- Geen bloemen, wel bezoek (lit.: "No flowers, although there are visitors"—on death and mourning)
- De Echte Tora (lit.: "The Real Torah"—on the history of the Talmud)
- Moge uw ziel gebundeld worden (lit.: May Your Soul be Gathered up - on Bereavement)
- De sja'atnez wijzer (verboden combinaties van wol en linnen): een moderne gids voor de diniem van sja'atnez voor de praktijk (on the laws of shaatnez)
- Transfer-Free (on Noachide Laws)

All of Evers's published books can be looked up at the Royal Library of the Netherlands.

He also writes articles on a regular basis for newspapers and magazines, as well as study material used in Dutch schools. He is a frequent spokesman for the Jewish point of view on radio and television, and during debates and lectures.
