= Kathinka Rebling =

German woman violinist and musicologist

- Born: 1941; The Hague
- Died: 2020 (aged 78–79)
- Parents: Eberhard Rebling (father); Lin Jaldati (mother)
- Relatives: Jalda Rebling (sister); Janny Brandes-Brilleslijper (aunt)

Academic background
- Education: Moscow Conservatory

Academic work
- Discipline: violin musicology
- Institutions: University of Music and Theatre Leipzig; Hochschule für Musik "Hanns Eisler"
- Main interests: folk song

Kathinka Rebling (1941–2020) was a German/Dutch violinist and musicologist.

== Life ==
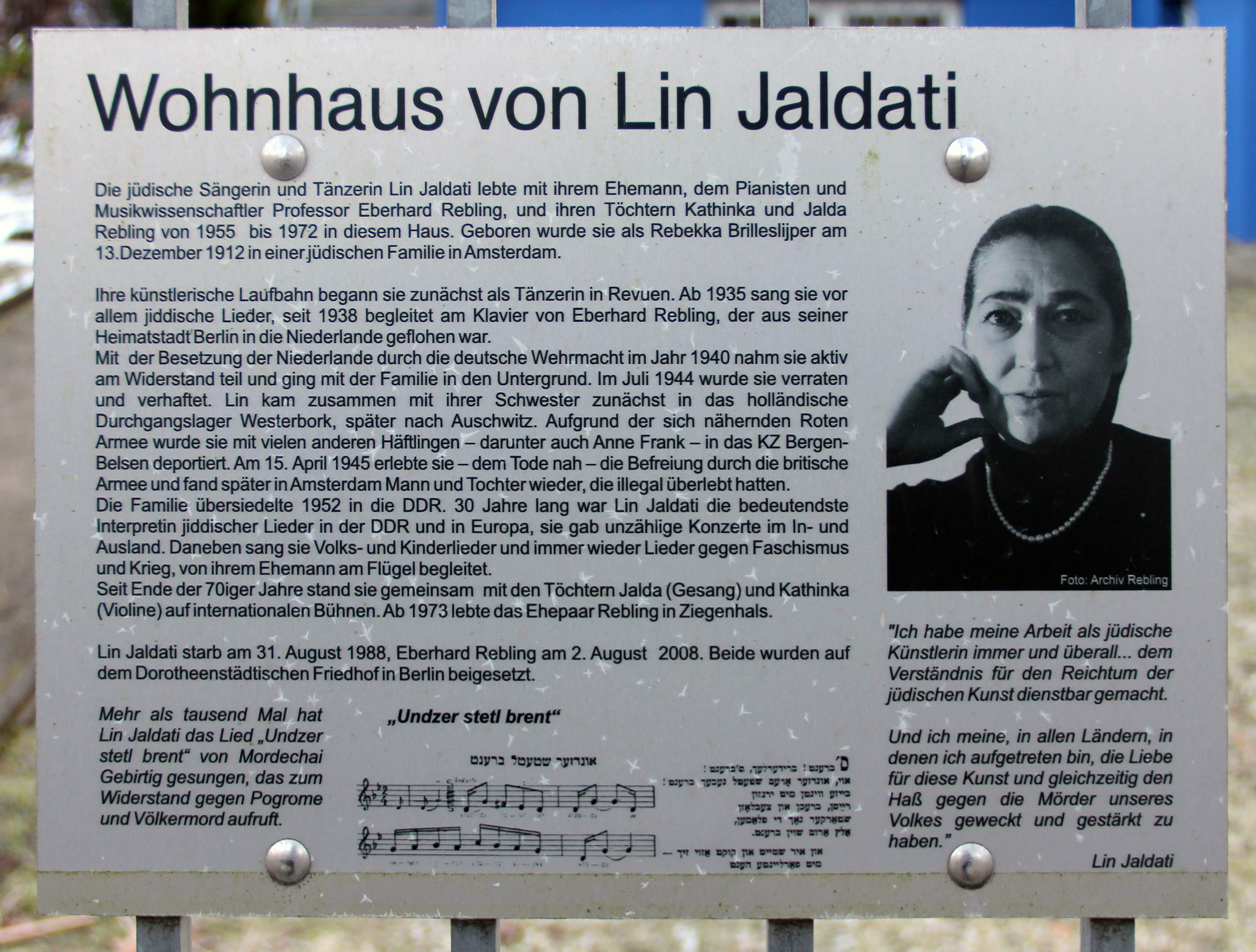
Commemorative plaque on her house at Puschkinallee 41, in Eichwalde

Rebling was born in The Hague. Her parents, the artist couple Lin Jaldati and Eberhard Rebling, had met in 1937 in the Netherlands, where Rebling had emigrated because of the Nazis. Her mother and aunt, Janny Brandes-Brilleslijper, were the first to report about the death of Anne Frank. Her sister Jalda Rebling is a hazzan. She received her first piano and violin lessons in Amsterdam. In 1952, the family moved to the DDR. From 1955 to 1959, she continued her violin studies with Werner Scholz at the orchestra and choir school of the Hochschule für Musik "Hanns Eisler" Berlin.

From 1959 to 1964, she studied the violin with Galina Barinova and Yuri Yankelevich at the Moscow Conservatory. From 1964 to 1967, she studied at the Faculty of Arts in Moscow, where she took over an artistic and scientific aspirant. In 1974, she was awarded a doctorate Dr. phil. in Moscow. From 1986 to 1989, she studied musicology at the Humboldt University of Berlin. For over 30 years, she taught violin and methodology at the University of Music and Theatre Leipzig and the Hochschule für Musik "Hanns Eisler".

Since the 1960s, she has devoted herself to folk song and artificial music of national minorities. In the 1980s she also performed Yiddish music together with her parents and her sister Jalda Rebling (singing) on international stages.

Rebling has published numerous scientific and methodological contributions. In 1995, she published Carl Flesch's posthumous work Die hohe Schule des Fingersatzes for the first time in the original.

She has given concerts in almost all European countries as well as in Israel, China, Cuba and the USA. Guest professorships took her to Beijing, Vila Seca and repeatedly to Vilnius. She is a jury member of numerous national and international competitions.

Former students of Rebling were and are active in leading orchestras of the Federal Republic of Germany (also as concertmasters) - such as the Gewandhausorchester Leipzig, the Staatskapelle Berlin, in Bayreuth and Stuttgart.

In 1999, she was appointed honorary professor for Sorbian music and music history at the Brandenburg University of Technology. There, she is president of the Institute for West Slavic Music Research e.V.

== Publications ==
- with Bert Greiner: Musikgeschichtsschreibung und nationale Minderheiten in Deutschland – Am Beispiel der sorbischen Musikgeschichte. In Musikwissenschaftlicher Paradigmenwechsel? Dokumentation der internationalen Fachtagung der Universität Oldenburg Oldenburg 2000
- Warum sorbische Musikgeschichte heute? In Letopis 2000
- Schicksale, Bekenntnisse, Umwege. In Aspekte der Berliner Streichertradition Carl Flesch und Max Rostal (ed.), Universität der Künste Berlin, Berlin 2002
- Zu den Wechselbeziehungen Oratorium-Oper bei Korla Awgust Kocor und Georg Friedrich Händel. Das Verhältnis beider Komponisten zu den Werkgattungen. In Im Wettstreit der Werte. Sorbische Sprache, Kultur und Identität auf dem Weg ins 21. Jahrhundert Bautzen, 2003
- I. Internationale Konferenz zur artifiziellen sorbischen Musik (ed.), Peter Lang GmbH, Frankfurt 2001
- Beiträge zur slawischen Musik in Mitteldeutschland mit Bert Greiner (ed.), Peter Lang GmbH, Frankfurt 2004
- with Bert Greiner editor of the series Beiträge zur westslawischen Musikforschung, Peter Lang GmbH, Frankfurt
