= Meir Just =

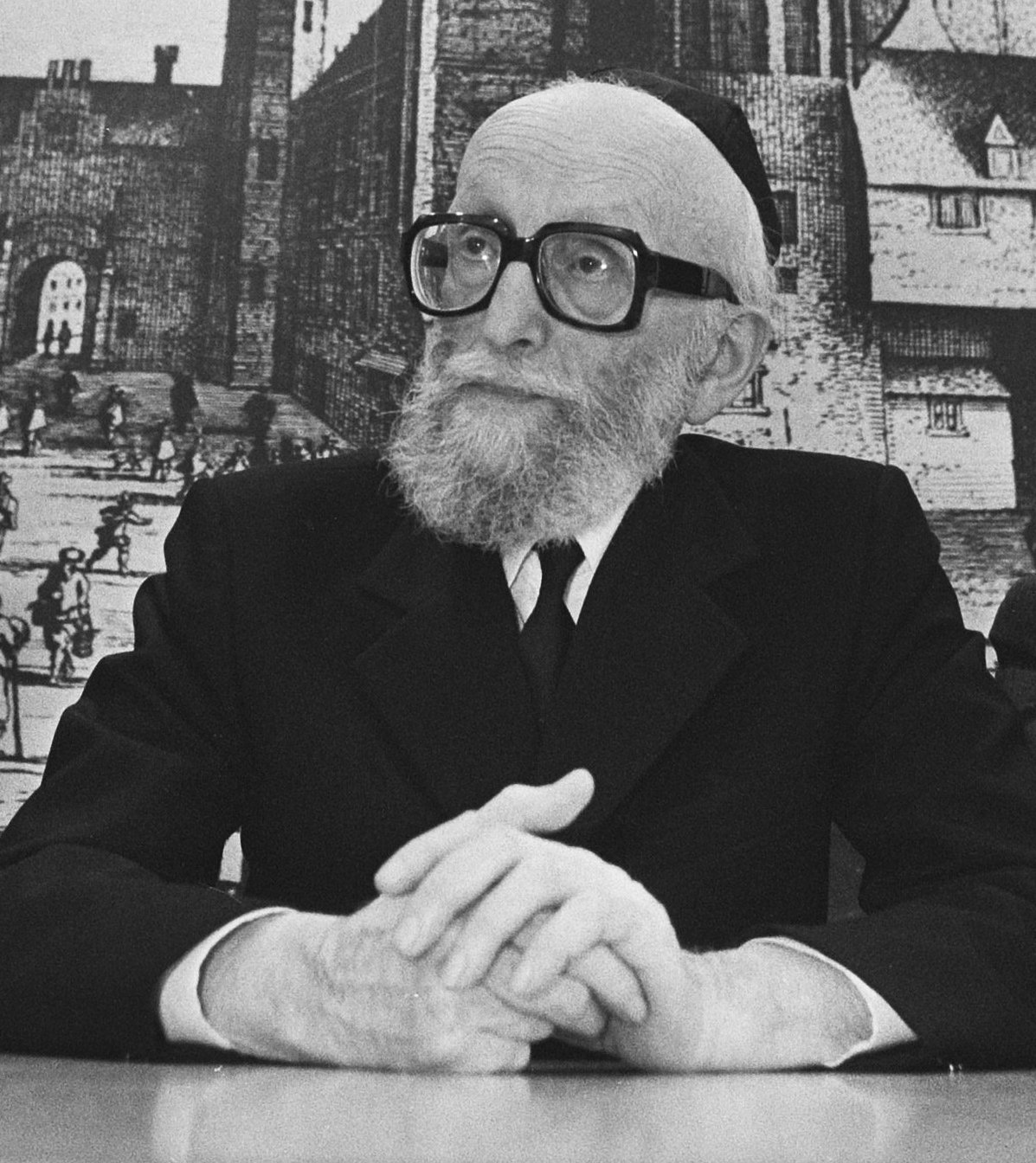
Meir Just (1982)

Meir Just (7 July 1908 – 9 April 2010) was the Chief Rabbi of Amsterdam, Netherlands. Just served as a spiritual leader for the Dutch Jewish community for more than 45 years, until his death in 2010.

Just was born on 7 July 1908 in Vizhnitz, Bukovina (now Vyzhnytsia, Ukraine) in 1908 to rabbi Nisan Just, chief composer for Vizhnitz dynasty and gabbai of the late Vizhnitser Rebbe. Just died at his home in Amsterdam on 9 April 2010, at the age of 101. His memorial service was held at the Raw Aron Schuster Synagogue in Amsterdam and he was buried in Israel.
