= Bloeme Evers-Emden =

Dutch child psychologist (1926–2016)

- בלומה אוורס-אמדן
- Portrait of Bloeme Emden with a Jewish star, c. 1942
- Born: Bloeme Emden; 5 July 1926; Amsterdam, Netherlands
- Died: 18 July 2016 (aged 90); Herzliya, Israel
- Resting place: Israel
- Education: PsyD, 1980s
- Alma mater: University of Amsterdam
- Occupations: Lecturer; child psychologist; writer
- Spouse: Hans Evers
- Children: Raphael Evers
- Writing career
- Language: Dutch
- Subject: Hidden children of World War II
- Notable works: Geleende Kinderen ('Borrowed Children'); Ondergedoken Geweest, Een Afgesloten Verleden? ('Hidden During the War: A Closed-Off Past?'); Geschonden Bestaan ('Shattered Existence'); Je ouders delen ('Sharing Your Parents')
- Notable awards: Order of Orange-Nassau

Bloeme Evers-Emden (Dutch pronunciation: [ˈblumə ˌʔeːvərs ˈɛmdə(n)]; Hebrew: בלומה אוורס-אמדן; 5 July 1926 – 18 July 2016) was a Dutch lecturer and child psychologist who extensively researched the phenomenon of "hidden children" during World War II and wrote four books on the subject in the 1990s. Her interest in the topic grew out of her own experiences during World War II, when she was forced to go into hiding from the Nazis and was subsequently arrested and deported to Auschwitz on the last transport leaving the Westerbork transit camp on 3 September 1944. Together with her on the train were Anne Frank and her family, whom she had known in Amsterdam. She was liberated on 8 May 1945.

In the 1980s, Evers-Emden earned a doctorate in developmental psychology and began interviewing and writing about the phenomenon of "hidden children" from the points of view of the children, their biological parents, their non-Jewish foster parents, and their non-Jewish foster siblings. She was also interviewed for several television documentaries on her remembrances of Anne Frank and her family before they went into hiding and after they were sent to Auschwitz.

== Early life ==
Bloeme Emden was born on 5 July 1926 in Amsterdam in the Netherlands to Emanuel Emden, a diamond cutter and a socialist, and Rosa Emden-de Vries, a seamstress. Her younger sister, Via Roosje, was born 29 May 1932.

In 1941, Bloeme attended the Jewish lyceum, where she befriended Anne Frank and her sister, Margot. Bloeme was in the same grade as Margot, but in a different class. In July 1942, Bloeme received a deportation order from the local government office. Her father went to the Central Room for Jewish Resettlement and found a sympathetic German who stamped the order "released." She returned to the high school in September, but her class kept shrinking from deportations throughout the year, to the point that only three students were left at the end of the year. By the time oral examinations were administered three weeks later, Bloeme was the only student in her class.

On the first day of the oral examinations in May 1943, Bloeme's non-Jewish boyfriend warned her that the Germans were looking for her. She asked the school board to administer all 12 of her examinations at once, and she received her high school diploma that same day. When the Germans arrived, they took her to an assembly point for Amsterdam Jews, but she managed to enter the building without being registered. A few days later, she snuck out with a group of younger teens. At first she hid in the home of Christian friends of her parents who worked in the Dutch underground, but they were afraid that if they were arrested, Bloeme would be, too. She spent the next year hiding in 15 to 16 different places, including an Amsterdam old-age home and a job as a maid for a widow and her son in Rotterdam. When she returned to the people who worked in the underground, she was arrested and sent to Westerbork.

== Deportation and incarceration ==
Bloeme was deported to Auschwitz on the last train leaving Westerbork on 3 September 1944. On the same train were the Frank family who had been discovered in hiding on 4 August. Bloeme saw Anne, Margot and their mother regularly in Auschwitz, although she was part of a separate group of eight women who stayed together, encouraging and helping one another. In October 1944, Bloeme and her group were selected for transfer to the Liebau labor camp in Upper Silesia. For the filming of the 1995 BBC documentary Anne Frank Remembered, Bloeme recalled that Anne, Margot, and their mother, Edith, also planned to join the transport, but Anne was prohibited from joining because she had developed scabies. Her mother and sister opted to stay with her, and Bloeme went on without them. Bloeme was also interviewed for her remembrances of the Frank women in Auschwitz in the 1988 television documentary The Last Seven Months of Anne Frank by Dutch filmmaker Willy Lindwer.

Bloeme was liberated by the Soviets at Liebau on 8 May 1945. She and a small group of friends began walking back to the Netherlands on foot, arriving six weeks later. She discovered that her parents and sister had been deported to the Sobibor extermination camp, where they all perished.

== Post-war research ==
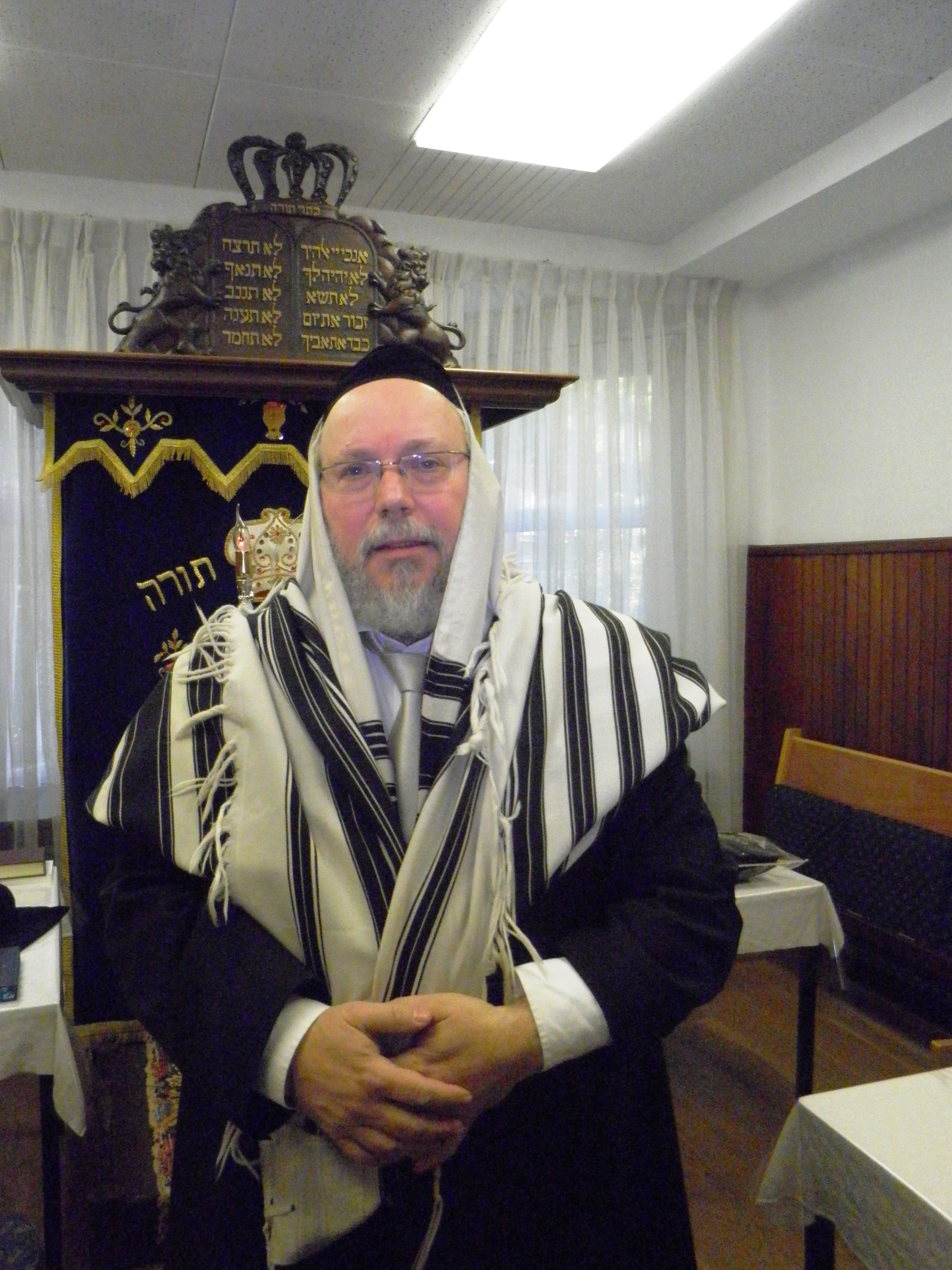
Evers-Emden's son Raphael Evers, Rabbi of Düsseldorf

After the war, she married Hans Evers and raised a "relatively large family" in Amsterdam. However, she testified, she was unable to talk about her war experiences with her family. She began studying psychology part-time and became a lecturer in psychology at the University of Amsterdam in 1973, earning her doctorate in the late 1980s.

In the 1980s, she began holding group therapy sessions for former hidden children, addressing "our grief, our anger, our aggression and our mourning". At the Hidden Child Conference held in Amsterdam in 1992, she interviewed 73 former hidden children, and with questionnaires completed by another 321 attendants, she began her research into the emotional and psychological trauma of hidden children, widening her scope to include the points of view of the children, their biological parents, their non-Jewish foster parents, and their non-Jewish foster siblings.

In the 1990s, Evers-Emden published four books in Dutch based on her research. Geleende Kinderen ('Borrowed Children'; 1994) focused on the foster parents who hid the children. Ondergedoken Geweest, Een Afgesloten Verleden? ('Hidden During the War: A Closed-Off Past?'; 1995) examined the written responses of 300 hidden children to a questionnaire. Geschonden Bestaan ('Shattered Existence'; 1996) interviewed the parents who sent their children into hiding. Je ouders delen ('Sharing Your Parents'; 1999) focused on the foster siblings of the hidden children.

In 1991, she was decorated by Queen Beatrix of the Netherlands as an officer of the Order of Orange-Nassau.

Her son, Raphael Evers, is the Rabbi of Düsseldorf.

Evers-Emden died on 18 July 2016, less than two weeks after her 90th birthday.

== Bibliography ==
- Geleende Kinderen ('Borrowed Children'), 1994
- Ondergedoken Geweest, Een Afgesloten Verleden? ('Hidden During the War: A Closed-Off Past?'), 1995
- Geschonden Bestaan ('Shattered Existence'), 1996 translated into Hebrew by Mechel Jamenfeld as Hayim Pegumim (Tel Aviv, 2000)
- Je ouders delen ('Sharing Your Parents'), 1999
- Joods Bloemlezen: Schetsen uit een gewoon Joods leven ('Jewish Anthology: Sketches from an ordinary Jewish life')
- Joodse Bloem-stukjes: Columns over het leven ('Jewish Anthology Pieces: Columns about life')
