= Laatste Zeven Maanden van Anne Frank =

1988 Dutch documentary

Laatste Zeven Maanden van Anne Frank (English title: The Last Seven Months of Anne Frank) is a 1988 Dutch television documentary directed by Willy Lindwer about the last seven months in the life of diarist Anne Frank. Seven different women, who were fellow prisoners of Anne Frank in the Westerbork transit camp, and the Auschwitz and Bergen-Belsen concentration camps, gave interviews about Anne's last months in this documentary. Among them are Hannah Pick-Goslar ("Hanneli"), Anne's childhood friend and fellow prisoner in Bergen-Belsen, and Janny Brandes-Brilleslijper, Anne's fellow prisoner in all three camps. Both women, who were cell mates with Anne and Anne's sister Margot, are believed to be among the last known people to have seen Anne alive.

The documentary won an International Emmy Award.

The interviews appeared as a book in 1992: The Last Seven Months of Anne Frank by Willy Lindwer.

Willy Lindwer wanted to film this book in Anne Frank's house. The director of the Anne Frank House refused to let him film it. He told Lindwer that Anne Frank was a symbol and symbols should not be shown dying in concentration camps.

== Interviewees ==
- Bloeme Evers-Emden
- Janny Brandes-Brilleslijper
- Anita Mayer-Roos
- Ronnie Goldstein-van Cleef
- Lenie de Jong-van Naarden
- Rachel van Amerongen-Frankfoorder
- Hanneli Pick-Goslar

== See also ==
- List of Holocaust films
