= Willy Lindwer =

Dutch film director

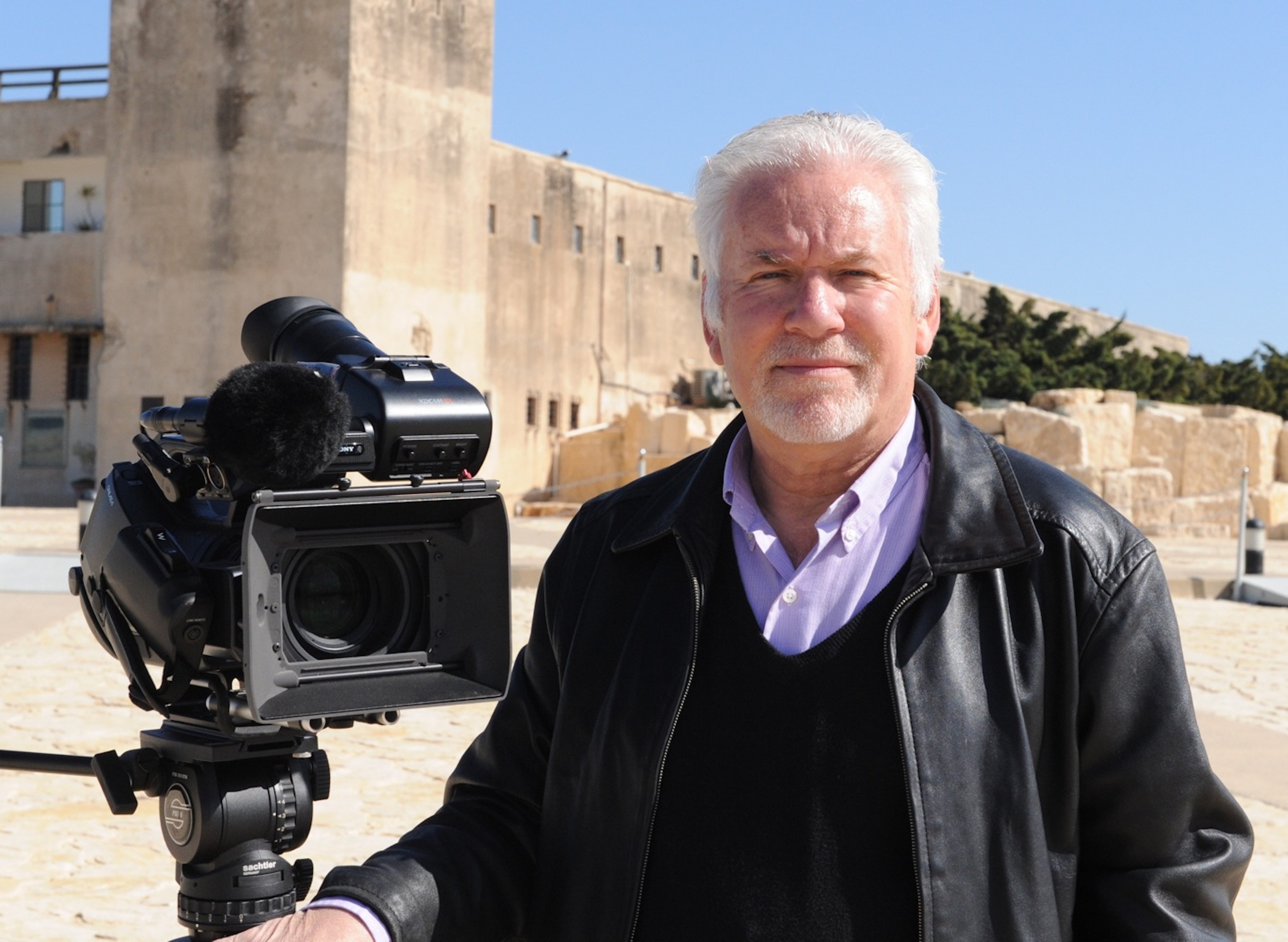
- Born: 18 March 1946 (age 80); Amsterdam, Netherlands
- Education: Netherlands Film and Television Academy
- Occupation: Documentary filmmaker
- Spouse: Hanna Emanuels
- Children: Two
- Website: The Willy Lindwer Film & Video Collection

Wolf "Willy" Lindwer (born 18 March 1946) is a Dutch documentary film producer, director, photographer and author. He is best known for his films on the Holocaust, Israel and the Middle East, Judaism and Christianity.

== Childhood and education ==
Willy Lindwer was born in Amsterdam, Netherlands in 1946. His parents fled anti-Semitic Poland and Ukraine and settled in Amsterdam in the 1930s. They were among the 10% of Jews in the Netherlands who survived the Holocaust.

Lindwer studied at the Netherlands Film and Television Academy.

== Career ==
After graduating, Lindwer worked for several Dutch Public TV stations. In 1985 he established his own company, AVA-Productions, in which he has made most of his films.

In 1988 he won the International Emmy Award for his film The Last Seven Months of Anne Frank. This film contains the testimonies of seven women who were witness to the last months of Anne Frank's life in the Nazi concentration camps, including Hannah Pick-Goslar (Hanneli), a former neighbor of the Franks; Bloeme Evers-Emden, a classmate of Margot; and Janny Brilleslijper who buried her in Bergen-Belsen.

On 29 April 2010 he was bestowed with the Dutch order Officer in the Order of Orange-Nassau by Her Majesty the Queen of the Netherlands in recognition of his film-work for the Netherlands.

Willy Lindwer has also published several books, some of which are based on the films he has made. His most famous work as an author is also The Last Seven Months of Anne Frank, translated into English by Alison Meersschaert.

Willy Lindwer has been a documentary filmmaker, producer and scriptwriter since graduating the Netherlands Film Academy in Amsterdam in 1971. For many years he was on the program staff of Dutch Public TV. He founded his company AVA Productions in 1985 in the Netherlands. Currently, he also heads an Israeli corporation, Terra Film Productions in Jerusalem. His companies are dedicated to the development and production of international documentaries and co-productions for television high quality. Willy Lindwer's documentaries are distributed worldwide, including Europe and the US.

Driven by a passion for oral history and his interest in exploring human hardships, Lindwer has travelled extensively around the globe, producing highly acclaimed series of documentaries about Europe, Africa and the Far East. Willy Lindwer's major international breakthrough came in 1988, when he was awarded the highest TV award, the International Emmy Award for his documentary The Last Seven Months of Anne Frank. In 1993 he won 'the Dutch State Award for Filmmaking, the Grand Prix of the Dutch Film Industry' in the category 'best documentary' for another major Holocaust documentary: Child in Two Worlds, the story of Jewish war orphans. Willy Lindwer has earned worldwide recognition with his series of documentaries about the Holocaust, Israel, the Middle East and the Arts. Willy Lindwer also produced the highly acclaimed documentary, The Lonely Struggle: Marek Edelman, Last Hero of the 1943 Warsaw Ghetto Uprising. According to the many flattering press reviews and reactions, the Dutch audience was equally impressed by his 1990 film and book Camp of Hope and Despair, Witnesses of Westerbork, 1939-1945. Willy Lindwer's film Simon Wiesenthal: Freedom is Not a Gift from Heaven was the Dutch Nominee for the International Emmy Award for Best Documentary, 1994. And a one-hour documentary about the life of Teddy Kollek. His feature-length film Yitzhak Rabin: Warrior-Peacemaker, was in 1998 awarded the 'Finalist Prize' at the New York Film and Television Festival. His film Goodbye, Holland (2004) was shown in three successive years on Israeli TV.

== Filmography ==
- Lost City, How Amsterdam lost it Jews during the war, with the collaboration of the tram.
- The Train Journey, the miraculous escape of Hungarian-Dutch Jews in 1943 (2018)
- Rebellious City, Amsterdam in the 19-sixties and the Provo movement (2015)
- Lonely but not alone. The story of a rebellion, Rabbi Nathan Lopes Cardozo (2015)
- Manja, a life behind invisible bars (2013)
- Remembering a Murdered Child (2012)
- Anna’s Silent Struggle (2009)
- Mr. Israel, The Shimon Peres Story (2008)
- Africa goes Digital The building of an information society (2005)
- Goodbye Holland (2004)
- The Temple Mount is Mine, two-part documentary (2003)
- Messengers Without an Audience, with Jan Karski (2002)
- Cameroon: Working on Credit (2002)
- D’vekut: Hasidism and Jewish Mysticism in Israel, a Personal Journey (2000)
- Stuart Eizentat: The Nazi Gold Reports (1998)
- Yitzhak Rabin: Warrior-Peacemaker (1998)
- The Return, three-part series about 100 Years Zionism and 50 years Israel (1998)
- Jerusalem: Between Heaven and Earth, a three-part series (1995)
- The Fatal Dilemma, The Jewish Council of Amsterdam (1995)
- Simon Wiesenthal: Freedom is Not a Gift from Heaven (1994)
- Teddy Kollek: From Vienna to Jerusalem (1993)
- Child in Two Worlds (1993) Golden Calf Best Dutch Documentary
- Return to my Shtetl Delatyn, about Willy Lindwer's father Berl Nuchim (1992)
- The Wannsee Conference (1992)
- Married with a Star, a Jewish Wedding in Amsterdam in 1942 (1991)
- Westerbork: Camp of Hope and Despair (1990)
- The Last Seven Months of Anne Frank (1988) International Emmy Award
- Marek Edelman, Last Hero of the Warsaw Ghetto Uprising (1987)
- The Pill Jungle (1985) the essential drugs list for health care
- House Without Foundation, with James Mason, about Afghan refugees (1984)
- Between Kabary and Satellite, Communication in Madagascar (1984)
- The Breaking Chain, Environment in Senegal, Ghana, Burkina Faso, Ivory Coast (1983)
- I am Their Eye, Education in Botswana, Kalahari dessert, Okavango Delta (1981)
- Food for the Future, The Turkana and Boran tribes in Kenya (1980)
- Live-Life, Three Choreographers and a Ballet - Dutch National Ballet (1979)
- Amsterdam 700 Years (1975)
- Dutch Police during the occupation of the Netherlands (1969/1970)
