= Janny Brandes-Brilleslijper =

Dutch Holocaust survivor (1916–2003)

- Born: Marianne Brilleslijper; 24 October 1916; Amsterdam, Netherlands
- Died: 15 August 2003 (aged 86); Amsterdam, Netherlands
- Burial place: Zorgvlied, Amsterdam, Netherlands; 52°20′8″N 4°54′1″E
- Known for: Holocaust survivor
- Spouse: Bob Brandes (m. 1939; died 1998)
- Children: 2
- Relatives: Lin Jaldati (sister)

Marianne Brandes-Brilleslijper (24 October 1916 – 15 August 2003), known as Janny, was a Dutch Holocaust survivor and one of the last people to see Anne Frank alive. She is the sister of singer Lin Jaldati (born Rebekka Brilleslijper; 1912–1988). Both Brandes-Brilleslijper and Jaldati (nicknamed "Lientje") were in the Westerbork, Auschwitz and Bergen-Belsen concentration camps with Anne and her older sister Margot.

== Life ==
Brandes-Brilleslijper was born Marianne Brilleslijper in Amsterdam on 24 October 1916, the middle of three children of Fijtje (née Gerritse) and Joseph Brilleslijper. In 1939, she married Cornelis Teunis "Bob" Brandes (1912–1998) and they had two children: Robert and Liselotte Dolores. After the Nazis invaded the Netherlands, Janny and Bob, along with Lientje, began to work in the Resistance. Janny kept Jewish people hidden in her home and never officially registered as a Jew.

The Nazis wanted to arrest Janny and her family because of her involvement in the resistance. While her husband and children escaped, Janny and Lientje were arrested in the summer of 1944 and transported to the Westerbork transit camp. They were listed as "criminals" and had to work in the work barracks, where Janny and Lientje met and befriended Anne and Margot.

From Westerbork, Janny, Lientje and the Franks were transported to Auschwitz. Janny and Lientje were later sent to the Bergen-Belsen concentration camp, where Anne and Margot were also transported in October 1944. Janny, who was made a nurse in the camp, took care of the ill prisoners. In February or March 1945, Margot and Anne died within a day of each other. Janny and Lientje buried them in the mass graves at the camp.

After the war, Brandes-Brilleslijper was reunited with her husband and children. Through the Red Cross she contacted Otto Frank and informed him of the deaths of his daughters. She returned to Amsterdam, where she grew up.

Brandes-Brilleslijper told her story about Anne and Margot's final days for the first time in the International Emmy Award-winning documentary movie The Last Seven Months of Anne Frank (1988), directed by Dutch filmmaker Willy Lindwer.

Brandes-Brilleslijper died of heart failure in Amsterdam on 15 August 2003 at the age of 86. She is buried at Zorgvlied cemetery.

== See also ==
- People associated with Anne Frank
