= Indiana Repertory Theatre =

Theater company in Indianapolis, Indiana, US

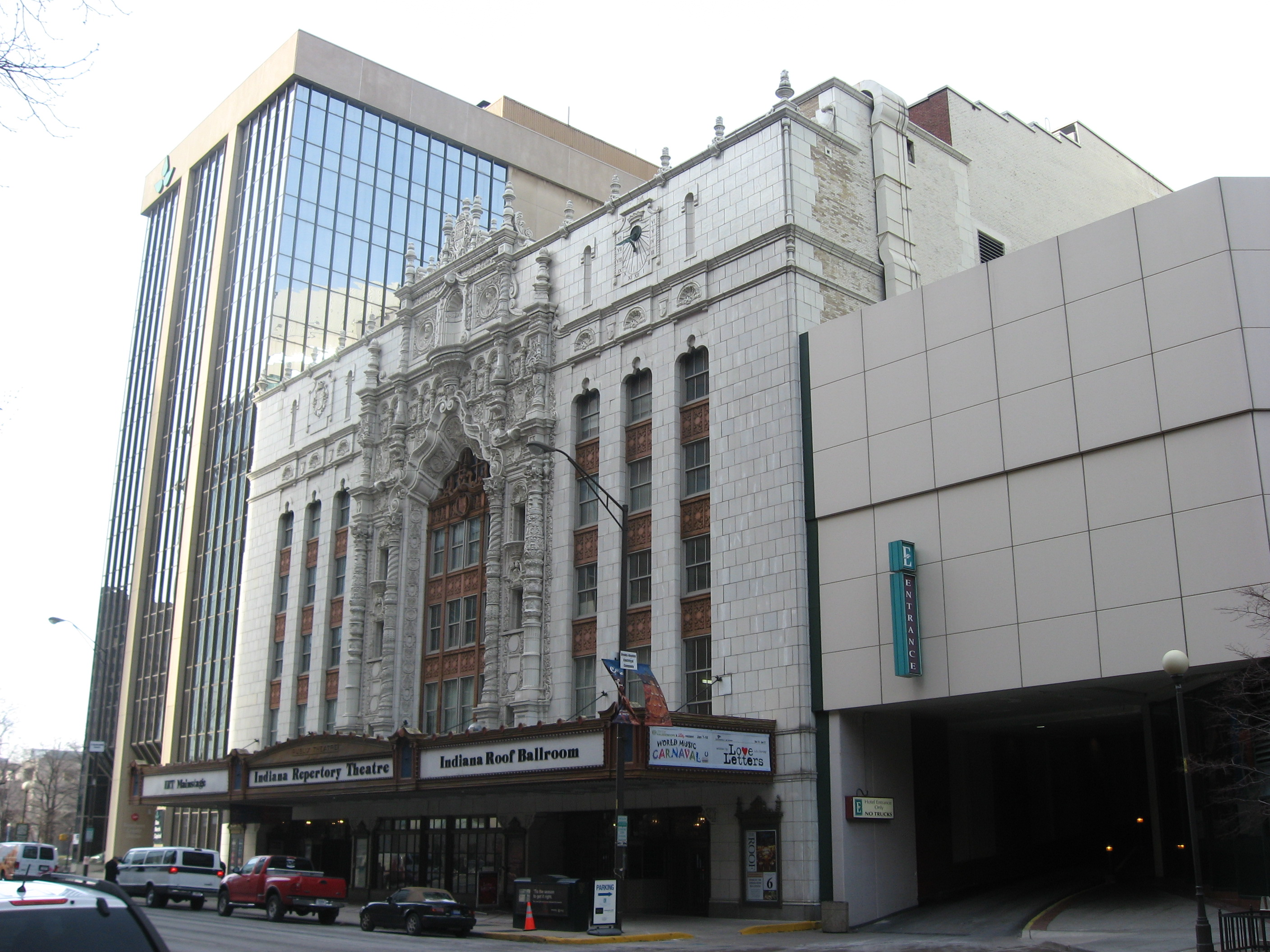
- The Indiana Repertory Theatre
- Interactive map of Indiana Repertory Theatre
- Address: 140 W Washington Street; Indianapolis; United States
- Coordinates: 39°46′03″N 86°09′40″W
- Event: Theatre

Construction
- Opened: 1971; 55 years ago

Website
- www.irtlive.com

Indiana Repertory Theatre, frequently abbreviated IRT, is a professional regional theatre in Indianapolis, Indiana that began as a genuine repertory theatre with its casts performing in multiple shows at once. It has subsequently become a regional theatre and a member of the League of Resident Theatres. A standard season typically consists of six plays on two different stages and the bulk of its season (including a holiday show, usually Charles Dickens's A Christmas Carol) performed on the OneAmerica Financial Stage.

The theatre company has history in two theatre buildings. It began in 1972 in The Athenaeum. In 1980, the IRT moved to its current home, The Indiana Theatre, a former Paramount Pictures Publix Theatre at 140 West Washington Street, built in 1927 and converted from a movie theater for IRT's use.

== Past actors and productions ==
Among the better-known actors that have performed multiple times at the theatre are Priscilla Lindsay, former Assistant Artistic Director, Scott Wentworth, a founding member, and John Henry Redwood, who would later pass away when touring a one-man show, he premiered in 2001 at Indiana Repertory. This show, Looking Over the President's Shoulder, was commissioned by James Still, the IRT's Playwright in Residence. This play is the true story of Alonzo Fields, who served as a butler to three presidents of the United States. Another playwright who has written works on IRT commissions is Charles Smith, including Les Trois Dumas and Sister Carrie, and last season's Gospel According to James. Another actor, Johnny Lee Davenport played Deputy Marshal Henry in The Fugitive and U.S. Marshals, as well as playing the title character in Othello. Tim Grimm makes regular appearances in the theatre, often, but not always, as a rural sort of character.

The theatre is well known in the state for their production of Charles Dickens's A Christmas Carol as adapted by Tom Haas, a late IRT artistic director/member of the former repertory company. It is a chamber theatre production modeled on David Edgar's The Life and Adventures of Nicholas Nickleby, that retains many of the story's darkest elements, such as the scene featuring Want and Ignorance that Dickens himself considered its heart but is often omitted.

For the most part, the theatre stopped doing musicals in the 1990s; however, the IRT did produce the world premiere musical Captive Heart: The Frances Slocum Story (1999), by Jeff Hooper (book) and Bob Lucas (music and lyrics). This musical is based on the story of Maconaquah, which is part of the standard history curriculum in Indiana, and an Indiana premiere of a musical with a book by Wentworth, Enter the Guardsman, based on the Ferenc Molnár play, The Guardsman, with music by Craig Bohmler and lyrics by Marion Adler. The IRT has done more recent productions of Crowns (Regina Taylor), The Fantasticks (Harvey Schmidt and Tom Jones), and Stephen Sondheim's A Little Night Music starring Sylvia McNair. IRT reintroduced musicals during their 2023–2024 season, producing Little Shop of Horrors. Since then, they have produced The 25th Annual Putnam County Spelling Bee, and the regional premiere of Come From Away in 2026.

IRT was the first theatre to cast an autistic actor Mickey Rowe as the lead character in the play The Curious Incident of the Dog in the Night-Time.

The theatre sponsors an Indiana playwriting competition for middle and high school aged writers, Young Playwrights in Process, funded in part by a gift from the late Robert and Margot Eccles.

== Past seasons ==
=== 2016–2017 ===
1. The Three Musketeers (m) 09/20/16 Dumas/Bush Woronicz, Henry
2. Finding Home: Indiana at 200 * (u) 10/18/16 multiple writers & Grimm Amster, Peter
3. A Christmas Carol (m – holiday) 11/19/16 Dickens/Haas Allen, Janet
4. Guess Who's Coming to Dinner (m) 01/10/17 Rose/Kreidler Greer, Skip
5. The Cay (u – students & families) 01/28/17 Taylor/Cornelison Roberts, Richard
6. Stuart Little (cab – young children) 02/25/17 White/Robinette Walters, Lori
7. Boeing Boeing (m) 03/07/17 Camoletti/Cross & Evans Gordon, Laura
8. Miranda (u) 03/28/17 Still, James Godinez, Henry
9. Dial “M” for Murder (m) 04/25/17 Knott, Frederick Still, James

=== 2015–2016 ===
1. The Great Gatsby (m) 10/01/15 Fitzgerald/Levy Amster, Peter
2. April 4, 1968: 10/21/15 Still, James Sale, Courtney
3. Before We Forgot How to Dream # (u)
4. A Christmas Carol (m – holiday) 11/11/15 Dickens/Haas Sale, Courtney
5. Peter Rabbit and Me (cab – young children) 11/17/15 Potter/Harris Bable, Wendy
6. The Mystery of Irma Vep (u) 01/12/16 Ludlum, Charles Still, James
7. To Kill a Mockingbird (m – students & families) 01/26/16 Lee/Sergel Allen, Janet
8. Fences (m) 03/09/16 Wilson, August Bellamy, Lou
9. Bridge & Tunnel (u) 03/29/16 Jones, Sarah Roberts, Richard
10. The Mousetrap (m) 04/26/16 Christie, Agatha Sale, Courtney

=== 2014–2015 ===
1. The Two Gentlemen of Verona (m) 09/16/14 Shakespeare, William Ocel, Tim
2. Red (u) 10/14/14 Logan, John Still, James
3. A Christmas Carol (m – holiday) 11/13/14 Dickens/Haas Sale, Courtney
4. The Velveteen Rabbit (cab – young children) 11/18/14 Still, James/Williams North, Carol
5. Good People (m) 01/07/15 Lindsay-Abaire, David Allen, Janet
6. The Giver (u – students & families) 01/23/15 Lowry/Coble Sale, Courtney
7. The Hound of the Baskervilles (m) 02/18/15 Wright/Pichette Amster, Peter
8. What I Learned in Paris (u) 03/17/15 Cleage, Pearle Bellamy, Lou
9. On Golden Pond (m) 04/14/15 Thompson, Ernest Allen, Janet

=== 2013–2014 ===
1. The Crucible - Arthur Miller
2. An Iliad - by Lisa Peterson and Denis O'Hare adapted from Homer translated by Robert Fagles
3. A Christmas Carol - Charles Dickens
4. and then they came for me: Remembering the World of Anne Frank - James Still
5. Kurt Vonnegut's Who am I this Time?(& other conundrums of love) - Aaron Posner
6. Other Desert Cities - Jon Robin Baitz
7. The Mountaintop - Katori Hall
8. Ken Ludwig's The Game's Afoot

=== 2012–2013 ===
1. Dr. Jekyll & Mr. Hyde' - Robert Louis Stevenson, adapted by Jeffrey Hatcher
2. The Night Watcher - Charlayne Woodard
3. The Syringa Tree - Pamela Gien
4. The House That Jack Built - James Still
5. Jackie and Me - Dan Gutman, adapted by Steven Dietz
6. A Little Night Music - music and lyrics by Stephen Sondheim, book by Hugh Wheeler
7. The Whipping Man - Matthew Lopez
8. A Midsummer Night's Dream - William Shakespeare

=== 2011–2012 ===
1. Dracula - Steven Dietz
2. I Love to Eat - James Still
3. Lost: A Memoir - Cathy Ostlere and Dennis Garnhum
4. Nobody Don't Like Yogi - Tom Lysaght
5. Julius Caesar - William Shakespeare
6. A Christmas Carol - Charles Dickens, adapted by Tom Haas
7. Radio Golf - August Wilson
8. God of Carnage - Yasmina Reza
9. Fallen Angels - Noël Coward
10. The Miracle Worker - William Gibson

=== 2010–2011 ===
1. Holes - Louis Sachar
2. Mary's Wedding - Stephen Massicotte
3. A Christmas Carol - Charles Dickens, adapted by Tom Haas
4. The Diary of Anne Frank - Frances Goodrich and Albert Hackett, newly adapted by Wendy Kesselman
5. Neat - Charlayne Woodard
6. Fire in the Garden - Ken Weitzman
7. In Acting Shakespeare - James DeVita
8. The Gospel According to James - Charles Smith - World Premiere
9. The 39 Steps - adapted by Patrick Barlow, original concept by Simon Corble and Nobby Dimon, based on the novel by James Buchan

=== 2009–2010 ===
1. Love Letters - A.R. Gurney
2. Romeo and Juliet - William Shakespeare
3. A Christmas Carol - Charles Dickens
4. Pretty Fire - Charlayne Woodard
5. The Year of Magical Thinking - Joan Didion
6. After Paul McCartney - David Hoppe
7. Becky's New Car - Steven Dietz
8. Around the World in 80 Days - Jules Verne, adapted by Mark Brown
9. The Heavens are Hung In Black - James Still
10. The Giver - book by Lois Lowry, adapted by Eric Coble

=== 2008–2009 ===
1. Sherlock Holmes: The Final Adventure - adapted by Steven Dietz, based on the original 1899 play by Sir Arthur Conan Doyle
2. Macbeth - William Shakespeare
3. A Christmas Carol - Charles Dickens, adapted by Tom Haas
4. This Wonderful Life - written by Steve Murray, conceived by Mark Setlock
5. To Kill A Mockingbird - Harper Lee, adapted by Christopher Sergel
6. Crime and Punishment - Fyodor Dostoevsky, adapted by Marilyn Campbell and Curt Columbus
7. The Ladies Man - Georges Feydeau
8. Crowns - Regina Taylor, adapted from the book by Michael Cunningham and Craig Marberry
9. Rabbit Hole - David Lindsay-Abaire
10. Interpreting William - James Still

== See also ==
- List of attractions and events in Indianapolis
- List of LORT Member Theatres
