= Eva Schloss =

Holocaust survivor (1929–2026)

Eva Schloss MBE
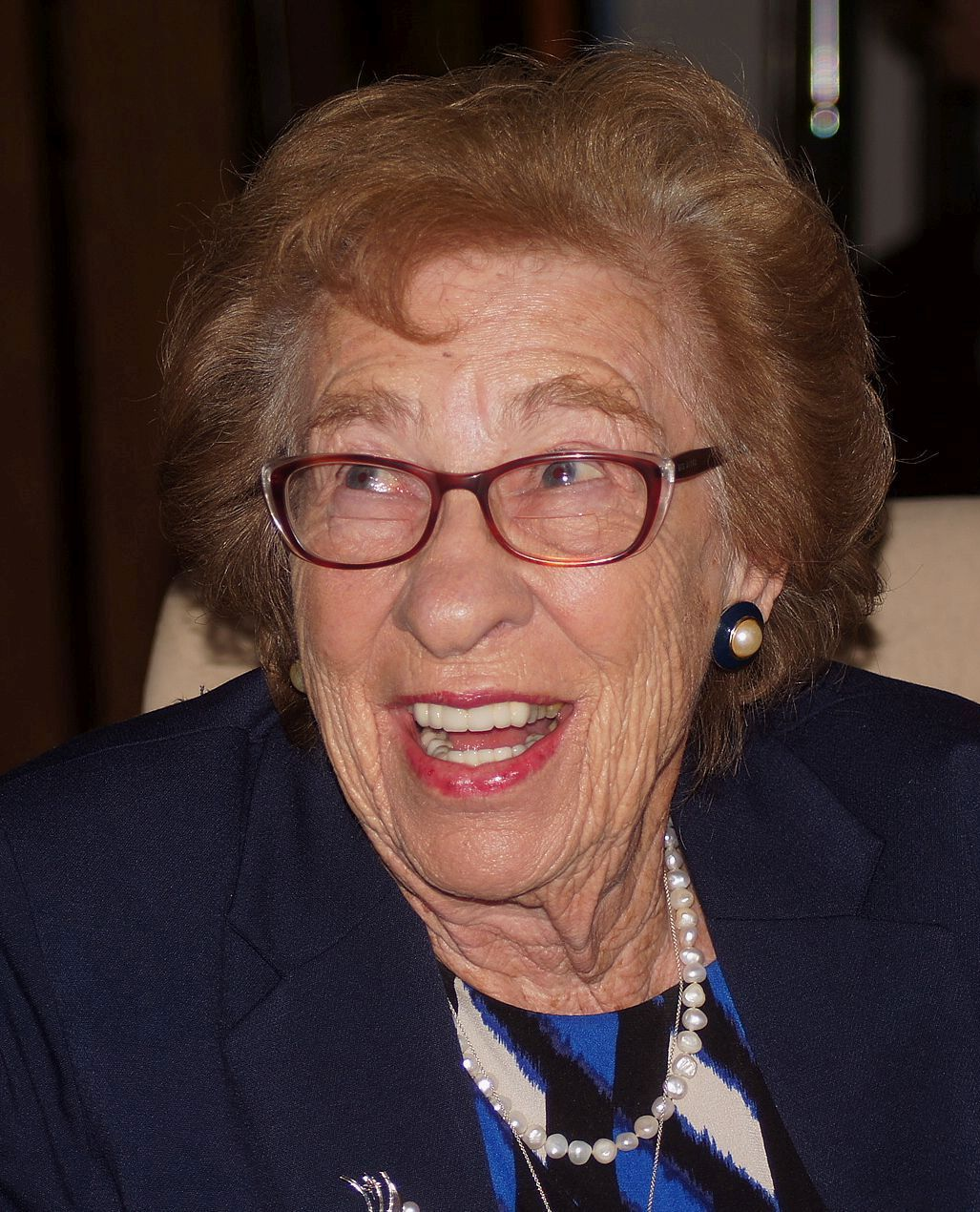
- Schloss in 2010
- Born: Eva Geiringer; 11 May 1929; Vienna, Austria
- Died: 3 January 2026 (aged 96); London, England
- Citizenship: Austria; United Kingdom
- Education: University of Amsterdam
- Occupation: Memoirist
- Known for: Holocaust survivor
- Spouse: Zvi Schloss (m. 1952; died 2016)
- Children: 3
- Parent(s): Erich Geiringer (father); Elfriede Geiringer (mother); Otto Frank (stepfather)
- Relatives: Heinz Geiringer (brother); Margot Frank (posthumous stepsister); Anne Frank (posthumous stepsister)
- Website: evaschloss.com

Eva Schloss (née Geiringer; 11 May 1929 – 3 January 2026) was an Austrian Holocaust survivor, memoirist, and the stepdaughter of Otto Frank, the father of Margot and diarist Anne Frank. She spoke widely about her family's experiences during the Holocaust and participated in the USC Shoah Foundation's Visual History Archive, recording interactive video testimony for use in educational programmes.

== Early life ==
Eva Geiringer was born on 11 May 1929 in Vienna to a Jewish family. She had an older brother, Heinz, born in 1926. Following the annexation of Austria by Germany in 1938, the family left Vienna, first for Belgium and later for the Netherlands. In Amsterdam, they lived in a nearby apartment block to the Frank family—Otto and Edith Frank and their daughters, Margot and Anne – the latter also born 1929.

In 1942, both families went into hiding to escape the escalating persecution of Jews in the Netherlands. In May 1944, the Geiringers were betrayed by a double agent in the Dutch underground and arrested. They were deported to Auschwitz‑Birkenau, where Geiringer's father and brother died. She and her mother survived and were liberated by Soviet forces in 1945.

After the war, they returned to Amsterdam. During this period, Geiringer and her mother renewed their acquaintance with Otto Frank, who was grieving the loss of his wife and daughters and coming to terms with the discovery of Anne's diary. In November 1953, Geiringer's mother, Elfriede (1905–1998), married Otto.

== Post-war life and death ==
After the war, Geiringer resumed her education and later studied art history at the University of Amsterdam. She subsequently travelled to England, where she spent a year studying photography. During that period, she met Zvi Schloss, a Jewish refugee from Germany whose father had been imprisoned in Dachau and who had previously lived in Mandatory Palestine. They married soon afterwards, settled in England, and later became British citizens.

The couple had three daughters and made their home in London. Zvi died in 2016.

In June 2021, Schloss became a dual citizen of the United Kingdom and Austria, reclaiming Austrian citizenship as an act of reconciliation with her country of birth.

Schloss died in London on 3 January 2026, aged 96. In a tribute, King Charles III said that he and Queen Camilla were "privileged and proud to have known her" and that they "admired her deeply".

== Outreach ==
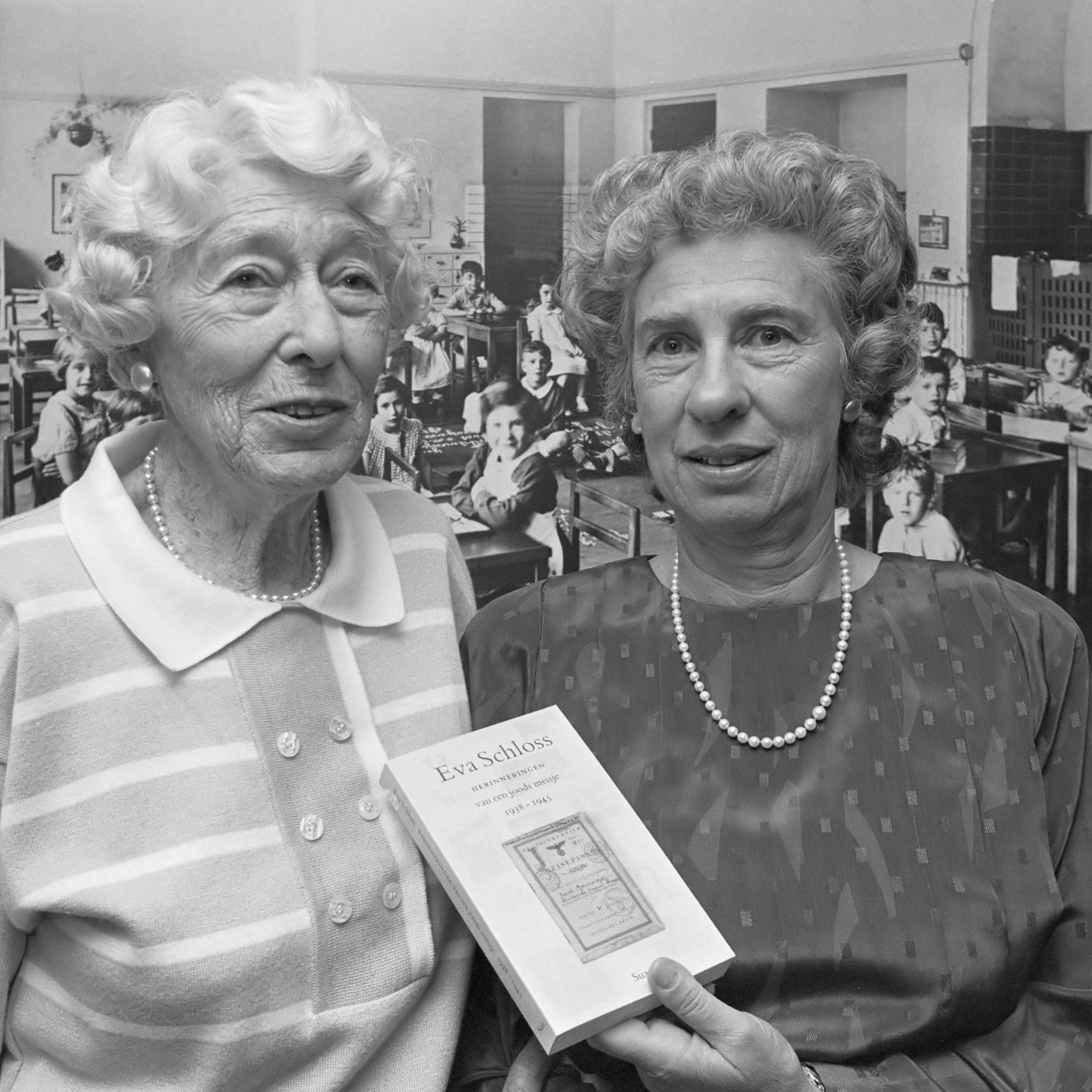
Schloss with her mother in 1989

Schloss did not speak publicly about her experiences in Auschwitz‑Birkenau until after Otto's death in 1980. Having witnessed her stepfather's dedication to preserving Anne's memory, she felt a responsibility to continue that work. She began sharing her family's experiences of the Holocaust at schools and universities, and later became a co-founder of The Anne Frank Trust UK. Her story as a young Jewish girl persecuted under Nazism was also depicted in James Still's play And Then They Came for Me: Remembering the World of Anne Frank.

As part of wider efforts to preserve survivors' testimonies for future generations, Schloss participated in the USC Shoah Foundation's Visual History Archive. She recorded extensive interviews using holographic technology, enabling museum visitors to ask questions and receive recorded responses from her interactive hologram.

In March 2019, during a book tour in Orange County, California, United States, Schloss met with a group of students, parents, and staff from Newport Harbor High School. The visit followed the circulation of photographs showing local students giving Nazi salutes beside a swastika made from drinking cups at a party. Schloss spoke to them about her experiences during the Holocaust, when she had been close to their age, to help them understand the implications of the imagery they had used.

== Honours ==
Schloss received an honorary doctorate from Northumbria University in 2001. She was appointed an MBE in the 2013 New Year's Honours, and was later awarded the Medal for Services to the Republic of Austria when she resumed Austrian citizenship in 2021.

== Works ==
- Eva's Story: A Survivor's Tale, by the Stepsister of Anne Frank (1988), ISBN 978-0-9523716-9-4
- The Promise (2006), ISBN 978-0-14-132081-6
- After Auschwitz: My Memories of Otto and Anne Frank (2013), ISBN 978-1-4712-4433-9
