= Mehr Hassan =

American actress

- Born: Mehrunnissa Hassan; 1983 or 1984; Lahore, Punjab, Pakistan
- Occupations: Actress; model; classical dancer

Mehrun Nissa Hassan, commonly known as Mehr Hassan, is an American actress, model, and classical dancer.

== Personal life and education ==
Hassan is the daughter of religious theologian Riffat Hassan. She was born to a Pakistani mother and an Indian father. Mehr is settled in Louisville, Kentucky, though she has also performed in films in India and Pakistan. She received her master's degree from the University of Louisville.

== Career ==
Hassan started her dancing career as a stage performer in the United States. During her college years, she visited India during summer breaks and began her film career in a Tamil film called Anbe Diana, in which she played the title character. During her stay in India, she also studied acting at the Kishore Namit Kapoor Institute. She continued to work in films while in college, including the award-winning films Diwali and Dreams. It was on the set of Diwali that Samina Peerzada approached her for her film, Shararat, which was filmed in Pakistan and released in 2003. She has also appeared in the films The Gold Bracelet (2006) and Heart Land (2009).

Hassan is an accomplished dancer and has worked in award-winning music videos as a dancer and director.

== Partial filmography ==
Release year	Film	Character	Director
2000	Anbe Diana	Diana	L.V. Athavin
N/A	Dreamers	Saira	K. Wadia
2001	Diwali (short film)	Sejal	Nick Sivakumaran
2003	Nilivil Kalangmilai	Diane	L.V Athavin
2003	Shararat	Zara	Samina Peerzada
2005	Hum Tum Aur Mom	Reena	A. Nanda
2006	The Gold Bracelet	Simrun Singh	Kavi Raz
2009	Heart Land	Neurotic Mummy-Baby	Fred Holmes
2010	Channa Sachi Muchi	Gypsy	Ijaz Bajwa
2010	Hotel Hollywood	Priya	Param Gill
2016	Sonne Da Karra	Simrun	Kavi Raz
2018	Lakeeran the Destiny	Zubeda	Dharam Panesar

== Music videos ==
- Directed and performed (vocals and dance) in Kuch Nahi Terey Bin
- Co-directed and performed (vocals and dance) in Man Mohna (My Spirit)
- Performed (vocals and dance) in Piya Nain Milla
