= Lenny Von Dohlen =

American actor (1958–2022)

- Von Dohlen on set in 1990, the day of filming Twin Peaks, "Episode 12"
- Born: Leonard Harold Von Dohlen IV; December 22, 1958; Augusta, Georgia, U.S.
- Died: July 5, 2022 (aged 63); Los Angeles, California, U.S.
- Occupation: Actor
- Years active: 1981–2022
- Partner: James Still
- Children: 1

Leonard Harold Von Dohlen IV (December 22, 1958 – July 5, 2022) was an American television, film, and stage actor. With a 40-year career that primarily featured work in independent films and guest appearances on numerous prominent series, he was probably best known for his performance as architect Miles Harding in the film Electric Dreams (1984), the title role as a steelworker's son opposite Karl Malden in Billy Galvin (1986), and as the orchid-loving agoraphobe Harold Smith in the television series Twin Peaks and its prequel film Twin Peaks: Fire Walk with Me.

== Early years ==
Von Dohlen was born on December 22, 1958, in Augusta, Georgia, and raised in Goliad, a small town in south Texas.

He had German ancestry from his paternal grandfather and French Cajun ancestry from his maternal grandfather. His grandmothers were of Irish ancestry. As a child he wanted to become a jockey, but grew too tall for his dream. He studied Theater at the University of Texas, and graduated from Loretto Heights College in Denver, Colorado. From there, he moved to New York City to pursue a career on the stage, saying in an interview: "I knew I wanted to go to New York City to work in the theater ... so I rid myself of my Texas accent by listening to John Gielgud records. Then, after I got to NYC, the first film I was offered was to play the leader of a country & western band in Texas. Ahh, irony."

== Career ==
=== Film ===
Von Dohlen's film debut was in the Academy Award-winning 1983 film Tender Mercies, starring Robert Duvall, as a young country musician seeking the advice of a former star living quietly in rural Texas. The following year, Von Dohlen played the lead role in the cult film Electric Dreams, as a shy architect who finds himself competing romantically with his computer for the affection of his neighbor, which Roger Ebert called "perfect casting". Other early movie roles include: Under the Biltmore Clock (1985); the title role in Billy Galvin (1986) opposite Karl Malden and Joyce Van Patten; Dracula's Widow (1987); Blind Vision (1992); Twin Peaks: Fire Walk with Me (1992); Jennifer 8 (1992); and Ed Zwick's Leaving Normal (1992).

He appeared in acclaimed independent films such as Tollbooth (1994), Bird of Prey (1996), One Good Turn (1996), Entertaining Angels (1996), Cadillac (1997) and Frontline (1997), and played one of the villains in Home Alone 3 (1997).

In 2007, he appeared in Beautiful Loser, and in Teeth, a Sundance and Berlin Film Festival Dramatic Competition nominee. In 2010, he played Elder Daniel in Downstream and in the same year he played Sheriff Jack Carter in a short film called Night Blind (2010). In 2012/13 he was seen in Camilla Dickinson and White Camellias.

In 2015, he played the title role of fictional legendary film director Oskar Knight in the mockumentary Near Myth: The Oskar Knight Story.

=== Television ===
Von Dohlen's first television role was a bit part in NBC's Emmy-award-winning Kent State (1981). He is well-known for portraying agoraphobic orchid lover Harold Smith in David Lynch and Mark Frost's 1990 TV series Twin Peaks. In 2010, for its homage to Twin Peaks, Von Dohlen appeared in USA Network's show Psych in the episode "Dual Spires", playing Sheriff Andrew Jackson joining a cast reunion including Sheryl Lee.

Other television roles include Don't Touch, directed by Beau Bridges; The Equalizer; Tales from the Darkside; Miami Vice; thirtysomething (1987); and The Lazarus Man (playing John Wilkes Booth), He appeared on The Flash as Jason Brassell, who creates a clone of The Flash/Barry Allen known as Pollux, in the 1991 episode "Twin Streaks"; Picket Fences (playing the gay brother of Marlee Matlin's character (1992)); as the diabolical Mr. Cox in a recurring role on The Pretender (1999); Walker, Texas Ranger (1996); and Chicago Hope (1999). He appeared in the Masterpiece Theatre presentation of Eudora Welty's The Ponder Heart (2000) on PBS.

In 1992, he played a government agent of a future fascist state in the BBC's Red Dwarf series V, episode 6, Back to Reality. In 2017 he appeared in Episode 12 of Seth MacFarlane's futuristic sci-fi Fox series The Orville, as the priest Valondis.

=== Theater ===
Onstage, he created roles in the New York productions of Asian Shade, The Team, Twister, Vanishing Act, and The Maderati, the latter two by Richard Greenberg. For nine months he starred in Caryl Churchill's play Cloud 9, directed by Tommy Tune, followed by The Roundabout Theatre Company's revival of Desire Under the Elms, opposite Kathy Baker.

He starred in Hamlet, Romeo and Juliet, Joe Orton's Loot, Legacy of Light at the Cleveland Play House, Lanford Wilson's one-man play A Poster of the Cosmos, and Doubt at the Indiana Repertory Theatre. On the West Coast, Von Dohlen was seen in Wedekind's Lulu at the La Jolla Playhouse, The Blue Room at the Pasadena Playhouse, and Theater District at the Black Dahlia Theater.

In Pasadena at The Theater at Boston Court, he both originated the role of the famous literary personality Voltaire in the world premiere of Jean Claude van Italli's Light and played Don Quixote in Tennessee Williams's Camino Real. In 2012 at GTC, he played Elyot Chase in Noël Coward's Private Lives.

== Death ==
Von Dohlen died on July 5, 2022, aged 63, in Los Angeles, after a long illness. His death was announced by his sister Catherine on Facebook three days later. He had a daughter, Hazel, and a partner, playwright James Still. He predeceased his mother, Gay Von Dohlen, and his siblings (Mary Gay, Catherine, and John David). His father, Leonard Harold Von Dohlen III, died in 2009.

== Filmography ==
=== Film ===
Year	Title	Role	Notes
1983	Tender Mercies	Robert	
1984	Electric Dreams	Miles (Moles) Harding	
1986	Billy Galvin	Billy Galvin	
1989	Dracula's Widow	Raymond Everett	
1991	Cold Heaven	Hotel Clerk (uncredited)	
1992	Leaving Normal	Harry Rainey	
1992	Jennifer 8	Blattis	Cameo
1992	Eyes of Beholder	Janice Bickle	
1992	Blind Vision	William Dalton	
1992	Twin Peaks: Fire Walk with Me	Harold Smith	
1994	Amberwaves	Justin Campenella	
1994	Tollbooth	Jack	
1995	Bird of Prey	Johnny McKenna	
1996	One Good Turn	Matt Forrest	
1996	Entertaining Angels: The Dorothy Day Story	Forster Batterham	
1997	Cadillac	Jimmy	
1997	Home Alone 3	Burton Jernigan	
1999	Frontline	Ludwig Haig	
2000	Breathing Hard	Anton	
2003	How's My Driving?	Adrian Kennet	Short
2007	Teeth	Bill	
2008	Beautiful Loser	Reggie (adult)	
2010	Downstream	Elder Daniel	
2010	Night Blind	Sheriff Jack Carter	Short
2011	Choose	Creepy Guy In Hotel	
2012	Camilla Dickinson	Bill Rowan	
2012	Annie and the Gypsy	Gordon	
2013	Dark Power	Bill Davies	
2015	Broken Horses	Joe	
2016	Threshold	Dr. Clair	
2017	Ray Meets Helen	Armond	
2017	Just Within Reach	Mr. Baker	
2018	The Maestro	Luc, Rejected Student	
2018	Near Myth: The Oskar Knight Story	Oskar Knight	
2019	Nasty	Harry Ryals	Short
2019	We Shall Overcome	Mr. Frost	Short
2020	For the Weekend	Doug	
2022	Creator	Dr. Richard Cooper	Short
2024	Sallywood	Dave	Posthumous release

=== Television ===
Year	Title	Role	Notes
1981	Kent State	Uncredited	TV movie
1983	Sessions	Paulie	TV movie
1984	How to Be a Perfect Person in Just Three Days	Erik Crimpley	TV movie
1984	Miami Vice	Bob Rickert	Episode: "Give a Little, Take a Little"
1984	American Playhouse	Knowleton Whitney	Episode: "Under the Biltmore Clock"
1985	ABC Afterschool Specials	Mike Rivers	Episode: "Don't Touch"
1985	Tales from the Darkside	Mr. Smith	Episode: "Distant Signals"
1986	The Equalizer	Dan Turner	Episode: "Shades of Darkness"
1988	Thirtysomething	Roy MacCaulay	Episode: "We'll Meet Again"
1989	The Young Riders	Lieutenant Josey Cassidy	Episode: "End of Innocence"
1990	Grand	Jeremy	3 episodes
1990	Twin Peaks	Harold Smith	4 episodes
1991	The Flash	Jason Brassell	Episode: "Twin Streaks"
1991	Love Kills	Jonathan Brinkman	TV movie
1992	Red Dwarf	Cop	Episode: "Back to Reality
1996	Picket Fences	Gerald "Gerry" Bey	Episode: "Bye-Bye, Bey-Bey"
1996	Walker, Texas Ranger	Adam "The Hangman" Quinn	Episode: "Hall of Fame"
1999	Chicago Hope	Tom Van Deusen	Episode: "A Goy and His Dog"
1999–2000	The Pretender	Mr. Cox	5 episodes
2000	The Magnificent Seven	Cyrus Poplar	Episode: "Penance"
2000	The Ponder Heart	DeYancey Clanahan	TV movie
2002	CSI: Miami	Professor Adam Metzger	Episode: "A Horrible Mind"
2007	Ghost Whisperer	Steve Wheeler	Episode: "Children of Ghosts"
2009	Criminal Minds	Record Exec #1	Episode: "The Performer"
2010	Psych	Sheriff Andrew Jackson	Episode: "Dual Spires"
2017	The Orville	Valondis	Episode: "Mad Idolatry"

=== Video games ===
Year	Title	Role	Notes
2018	Red Dead Redemption 2	The Local Pedestrian Population	Voice
