= Otto Frank =

Father of Anne Frank (1889–1980)

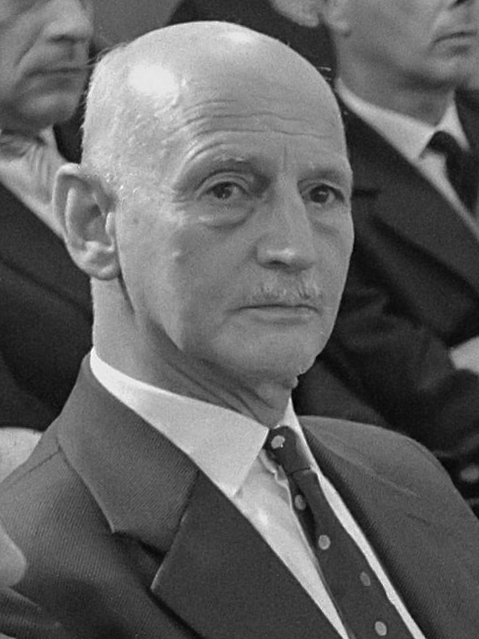
- Frank in 1961
- Born: Otto Heinrich Frank; 12 May 1889; Frankfurt, Germany
- Died: 19 August 1980 (aged 91); Birsfelden, Switzerland
- Resting place: Birsfelden Cemetery
- Citizenship: Germany (revoked); Switzerland
- Occupation: Spice merchant
- Known for: Father of Anne Frank; The Diary of a Young Girl
- Spouses: Edith Holländer (m. 1925; died 1945) Elfriede Geiringer (m. 1953)
- Children: Margot; Anne
- Military career
- Allegiance: German Empire
- Branch: Imperial German Army
- Service years: 1915–1918
- Rank: Lieutenant
- Conflicts: World War I; Western Front; Battle of the Somme; Battle of Cambrai
- Awards: Iron Cross

Otto Heinrich Frank (12 May 1889 – 19 August 1980) was a German businessman, and the father of Anne Frank. He edited and published the first edition of her diary in 1947 (subsequently known in English as The Diary of a Young Girl) and advised on its later theatrical and cinematic adaptations. In the 1950s and the 1960s, he established European charities in his daughter's name and founded the trust which preserved his family's wartime hiding place, the Anne Frank House, in Amsterdam.

== Early life ==
Otto Heinrich Frank was born into a German Jewish family. He was the second of four children born to Alice Betty (née Stern, 1865–1953) and Michael Frank (1851–1909). His elder brother was Robert Frank, and younger siblings were Herbert Frank and Helene (Leni) Frank. Otto was a cousin of the furniture designer Jean-Michel Frank and a grandson of Zacharias Frank. His father originally came from Landau, and moved to Frankfurt in 1879, marrying Alice Stern in 1886. Alice and Michael Frank placed value on a middle-class education. Otto had music lessons, learned to ride a horse and visited the theater and opera regularly. The Frank family enjoyed a large circle of friends, and kept a welcoming home. Otto studied economics in Heidelberg from 1908 to 1909 and had a work experience placement at Macy's Department Store in New York City thanks to a college friend his age, Nathan Straus Jr. However, after leaving for New York, he had to return home briefly because of his father's death in September 1909, before once again leaving for the United States. He returned to Germany two years later in 1911.

== Military service ==
Frank served in the Imperial German Army during World War I. He and his two brothers were drafted for military service in August 1915 and after training at a depot in Mainz, he served in an artillery unit on the Western Front in which most soldiers were mathematicians and surveyors. In 1916, he was attached to the infantry as a range-finder at the Battle of the Somme. In 1917, he was promoted in the field to lieutenant and served at the Battle of Cambrai, where two of his French cousins, Oscar and Georges, were killed in action. According to other sources, Frank was late returning home because he was ordered to confiscate two horses from a farmer and returned them to the farmer when the war ended in defeat. He was awarded the Iron Cross for his military service.

== Marriage and children ==
Frank worked in the bank that his father initially ran, which subsequently he and his brothers inherited until its collapse in the early 1930s. He married 25-year-old Edith Holländer – an heiress to a scrap-metal and industrial-supply business on 12 May 1925, at the synagogue in Aachen, Edith's hometown. Their elder daughter, Margot Frank (Margot Betti), was born 16 February 1926, followed by their younger daughter, Anne (Annelies Marie), on 12 June 1929. Edith died of starvation and disease in Auschwitz on 6 January 1945. In late October 1944, Margot and Anne were transferred from Auschwitz to the Bergen-Belsen concentration camp where they died of typhus.

In 1953, Frank married Elfriede (Fritzi) Markovits, a Holocaust survivor, who assisted him with the Anne Frank Foundation in Basel, which he launched a decade later. Markovits's daughter, Eva Schloss, was a Holocaust survivor, peace activist and international speaker.

== World War II ==
As the tide of Nazism rose in Germany and anti-Jewish decrees encouraged attacks on Jewish individuals and families, Frank decided to evacuate his family. In August 1933, they relocated to Aachen, where his mother-in-law, Rosa Holländer resided, in preparation for a subsequent and final move to Amsterdam in the Netherlands. In the same year, Frank's widowed mother, Alice Frank, fled to Switzerland.

Frank's brother-in-law Erich Elias (the husband of his younger sister Leni and father of Buddy Elias) worked in Basel for Opekta, a company that sold spices and pectin for use in the manufacture of jam. The company was looking to expand its operations in Europe, and Elias arranged for Frank to work as Opekta's agent in Amsterdam, allowing Frank to have an income to support his family once they had moved there. Frank and his family lived in Merwedeplein in the modern suburb of Amsterdam-Zuid; they came to know many other German emigrant families. In 1938, Frank started a second company, Pectacon, which was a wholesaler of herbs, pickling salts, and mixed spices, used in the production of sausages. Hermann van Pels was employed by Pectacon as an advisor about spices. A Jewish butcher, he had fled Osnabrück with his family. In March 1939, Edith Hollander's mother came to live with the Franks and remained with them until her death in January 1942. After Germany invaded the Netherlands in May 1940, Frank was forced by the Germans to give up his companies. Frank made his businesses look "Aryan" by transferring control to his employees.

In 1938 and 1941, Frank attempted to obtain visas for his family to emigrate to the United States or Cuba. He was granted a single visa for himself to Cuba on 1 December 1941, but it is not known if it ever reached him. Ten days later, when Nazi Germany and Fascist Italy declared war on the United States, the visa was canceled. He also attempted to obtain visas for his family to Britain; however, those were never granted.

At the age of 53, when the systematic deportation of Jews from the Netherlands started in the summer of 1942, Frank took his family into hiding on 6 July 1942 in the upper rear rooms of the Opekta premises on the Prinsengracht, behind a concealing bookcase. The day before, his older daughter, Margot, had received a written summons to report for so-called labour duty in Germany, and Frank immediately decided to move the family to safety. They were joined a week later by Hermann van Pels, who was known as Herman van Daan in Anne's diary, his wife, Auguste van Pels, and their son, Peter van Pels. In November, the group was joined by Fritz Pfeffer, known in Anne's diary as Albert Dussel. Their concealment was aided by Frank's colleagues Johannes Kleiman, whom he had known since 1923, Miep Gies, and her husband Jan Gies; Victor Kugler, and Bep Voskuijl.

The group hid for two years, until their discovery in August 1944. It is not known whether an informant or a chance discovery by authorities ended their period of refuge. The group, along with Kugler and Kleiman, were arrested by SS Officer Karl Silberbauer, whose team was usually tasked with investigating financial crimes and not with searching for hidden Jews. This element, together with the fact that the officers inspected all the crates, bags and jars before they found the revolving bookcase indicates that perhaps they were not aware about the hiders. Miep Gies and Bep Voskuijl were not arrested with the group. Gies managed to excuse herself by saying she knew nothing of those in hiding, and Johannes Kleiman gave Voskuijl his wallet with the request to take it to his friend Derk Kollen who had a pharmacy around the corner on the Leliegracht, a pre-arranged signal to inform Kleiman's family that there was a problem, and she was able to leave the building unhindered because no police officers were guarding the outside at that moment.

After being imprisoned in the Huis van Bewaring (House of Detention) on the Weteringschans in Amsterdam, the Jewish prisoners were sent to the Dutch transit camp of Westerbork and finally, in September, to Auschwitz-Birkenau, where Frank was separated from his wife and daughters. He was sent to the men's barracks and was residing in the sick barracks when the camp was liberated by Soviet troops on 27 January 1945. After the liberation of Auschwitz, Frank wrote to his mother in Switzerland, where she had fled in 1933 when Hitler came to power. He travelled back to the Netherlands over the next six months and searched diligently for his family and friends. By the end of 1945, he realized he was the sole survivor of those who had hidden in the house on the Prinsengracht.

== Letter from the Monowai steamship ==
The closer we get to home, the greater our impatience to hear from our loved ones. Everything that's happened the past few years! Until our arrest, I don't know exactly what caused it, even now, at least we still had contact with each other. I don't know what's happened since then. Kugler and Kleiman and especially Miep and her husband and Bep Voskuil provided us with everything for two whole years, with incomparable devotion and sacrifice and despite all danger. I can't even begin to describe it. How will I ever begin to repay everything they did. But what has happened since then? To them, to you to Robert [Otto's brother and Edith Frank's brother-in-law]. Are you in touch with Julius and Walter? [Edith Hollander's brothers and Otto's brothers-in-law] All our possessions are gone. There won't be a pin left, the Germans stole everything. Not a photo, letter or document remains. Financially, we were fine in the past few years, I earned good money and saved it. Now it's all gone. But I don't think about any of that. We have lived through too much to worry about that kind of thing. Only the children matter, the children. I hope to get news from you immediately. Maybe you've already heard news about the girls.

— Letter sent by Otto Frank on board the Monowai steamship May 15, 1945 on his way back to Amsterdam

== Post-war life ==
After Anne Frank's death was confirmed in the summer of 1945, her diary and papers were given to Otto Frank by Miep Gies, who had rescued them from the ransacked hiding place together with Bep Voskuijl. As Gies wrote in her book, Anne Frank Remembered, Frank immediately started to read the papers. Later he began transcribing them for his relatives in Switzerland. He was persuaded that Anne's writing shed light on the experiences of those who suffered persecution under the Nazis and was urged to consider publishing it. He typed out the diary into a single manuscript, editing out sections he thought too personal to his family or too mundane to be of interest to the general reader. The manuscript was read by Dutch historian Jan Romein, who reviewed it on 3 April 1946 for the Het Parool newspaper. This attracted the interest of Amsterdam's Contact Publishing, which accepted it for publication in the summer of 1946. Otto Frank is now recognized as a co-author of the diary, in order to extend the book's copyright to 2050.

On 25 June 1947, the first Dutch edition of the diary was issued under the title Het Achterhuis ("The House Behind"). Its success led to an English translation in 1952, which led to a theatrical dramatisation in 1955 and eventually the film The Diary of Anne Frank (1959), with actor Joseph Schildkraut reprising his role as Otto.

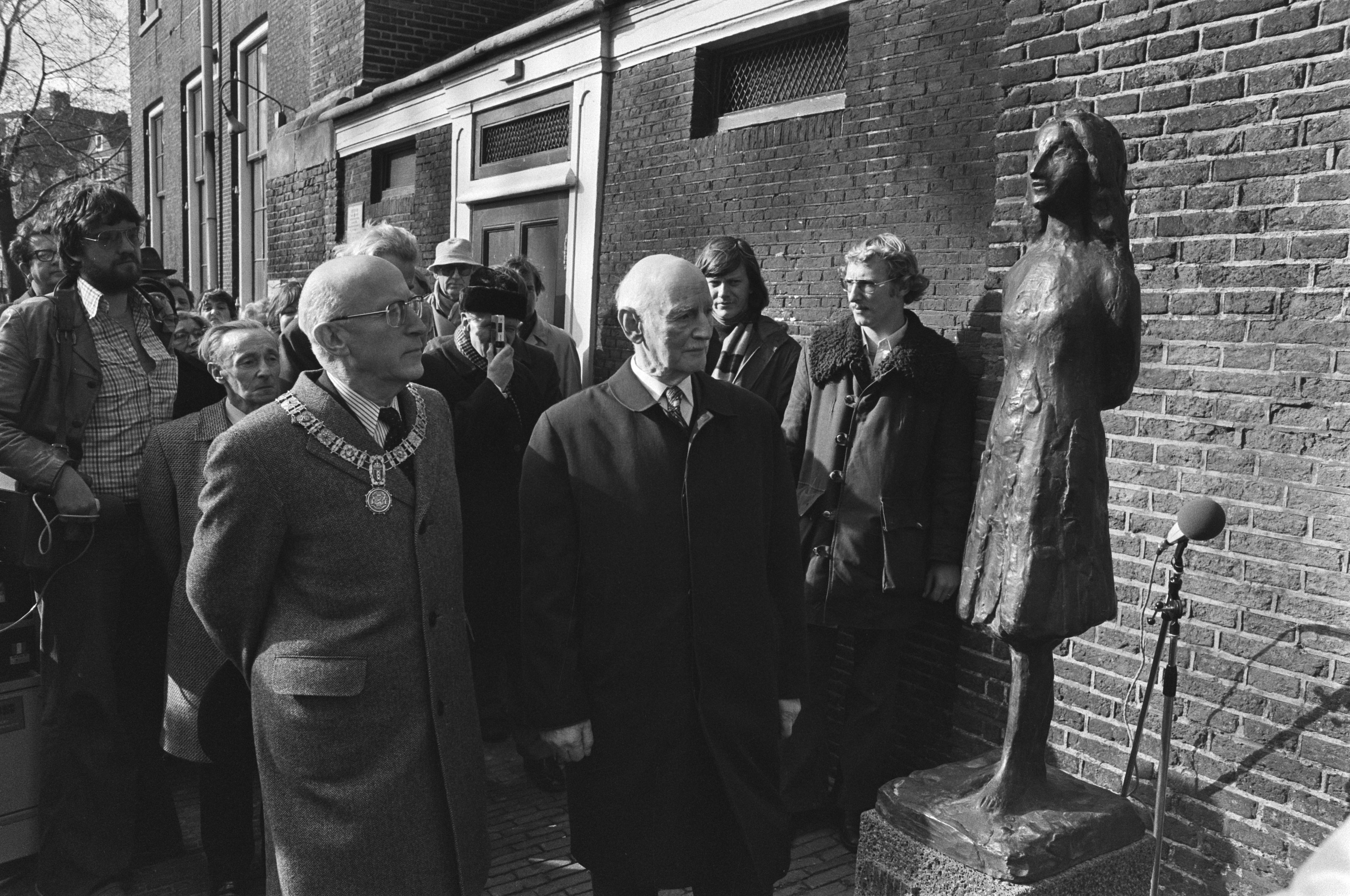
Otto Frank inaugurating the Statue of Anne Frank, Amsterdam 1977

Frank married former Amsterdam neighbor and fellow Auschwitz survivor Elfriede Geiringer (1905–1998) in Amsterdam on 10 November 1953, and the couple moved to Basel, Switzerland, where he had family, including relatives' children, with whom he shared his experiences. In 1963, he founded the Anne Frank Foundation in Basel (not to be confused with the Anne Frank Foundation in Amsterdam, see below), which is devoted to global distribution and use of the Diary of Anne Frank. The non-profit organisation uses the proceeds of the copyrights for charitable purposes, education, and scientific research. In addition the Foundation in Basel supports projects in the field of human rights, racial equality, and promoting social justice.

In response to a demolition order placed on the building in which Frank and his family hid during the war, he and Johannes Kleiman helped establish the Anne Frank Foundation in Amsterdam on 3 May 1957, with the principal aim to save and restore the building so it could be opened to the general public. With the aid of public donations, the building and the adjacent one were purchased by the Amsterdam-based foundation. It opened as a museum (the Anne Frank House) on 3 May 1960 and is still in operation.

For the rest of his life, Frank dedicated himself to the publication of the diary and the ideals his daughter had expressed in it. Frank died of lung cancer on 19 August 1980 in Birsfelden and his ashes were buried in the town's cemetery, where Elfriede would also be buried, in the same tomb, 18 years later. He was survived by his stepdaughter Eva Schloss, his sister Helene Frank (Edith Frank's sister-in-law) and her two children.

Frank designated the Anne Frank Foundation in Basel as his sole heir and legal successor, which means that the copyright on all Anne Frank's writings belongs to this organisation.

== Legal fights against Nazi sympathizers ==
In the years after the diaries were published, Otto Frank became embroiled in a series of legal battles with individuals who accused him or others of forging the manuscript; these cases would persist even after Frank's death in 1980. In 1959, Frank "lodged a criminal complaint on the grounds of libel, slander, defamation, maligning the memory of a deceased person and antisemitic utterances" against two members of the right-wing Deutsche Reichspartei, Lothar Stielau and Heinrich Buddeberg, who had dismissed the diary as a work of fiction.

In 1976, Nazi sympathizer Ernst Römer accused Frank of editing and fabricating parts of Anne's diary. Frank filed a lawsuit against him. As with the previous case, the court determined that the diary was authentic. Römer demanded a second investigation, but on this occasion the Hamburg District Court engaged the Bundeskriminalamt (BKA). It was claimed that parts of her diary were written with ballpoint pen ink, which did not exist prior to 1951. However, the BKA found that these parts were simply two scraps of paper not attached to the manuscript and clearly written in different handwriting. Some page numbers are presumed to have been added by Frank when compiling the diary for publication. No diary entry is written in ballpoint ink. Reporters were unable to question Frank, as he died around the time of the discovery.

== Books ==
- The Diary of a Young Girl, Anne Frank ISBN 0-553-29698-1
- Anne Frank Remembered, Miep Gies and Alison Leslie Gold ISBN 0-671-66234-1
- The Hidden Life of Otto Frank, Carol Ann Lee ISBN 0-670-91331-6
- Roses from the Earth: the biography of Anne Frank, Carol Ann Lee ISBN 0-670-88140-6
- Love, Otto, Cara Wilson ISBN 0-8362-7032-0
- Eva's Story, Eva Schloss ISBN 0-9523716-9-3
- Mirjam Pressler, Treasures From The Attic ISBN 1407231103
- The Last Secret of the Secret Annex: The Untold Story of Anne Frank, Her Silent Protector, and a Family Betrayal, Joop van Wijk-Voskuijl and Jeroen De Bruyn ISBN 9781982198213
