= Billy Galvin =

1986 film by John Gray

- Theatrical release poster
- Directed by: John Gray
- Written by: John Gray
- Produced by: Sue Jett; Tony Mark
- Starring: Karl Malden; Lenny von Dohlen; Joyce Van Patten; Toni Kalem; Keith Szarabajka
- Cinematography: Eugene D. Shlugleit
- Edited by: Lou Kleinman
- Music by: Joel Rosenbaum
- Production company: American Playhouse
- Distributed by: Vestron Pictures
- Release date: November 1986
- Running time: 99 minutes
- Country: United States
- Language: English

Billy Galvin is a 1986 American drama film directed by John Gray. It stars Karl Malden and Lenny von Dohlen.

== Plot ==
Conflict arises between a steelworker and his son. The father wants the boy to have a chance to make more of himself than he did, but the son wants to follow in his father's footsteps and become a steel-worker himself.

== Cast ==
- Karl Malden as Jack Galvin
- Lenny von Dohlen as Billy Galvin
- Joyce Van Patten as Mae Galvin
- Toni Kalem as Nora
- Alan North as George
- Keith Szarabajka as Donna
