= Josef Sommer =

American actor (b. 1934)

- Born: Maximilian Josef Sommer; June 26, 1934 (age 92); Greifswald, Germany
- Education: Carnegie Mellon University (BFA)
- Occupation: Actor
- Years active: 1971–2010

Maximilian Josef Sommer (born June 26, 1934) is a German-American retired stage, film and television actor.

== Early life and education ==
Sommer was born in Greifswald, Germany, from which he and his parents, Elisabeth and Clemens Sommer, a professor of art history at the University of North Carolina, emigrated in 1938 with his sister Maria and brother Sebastian. He studied theatre at the Carnegie Institute of Technology. Sommer served in the U.S. Army. Afterwards, he trained as an actor at the American Shakespeare Festival in Connecticut.

== Career ==
Stage

Sommer made his acting debut in 1943 at the age of nine in the Carolina Playmakers production of Lillian Hellman's 1941 American drama play, Watch on the Rhine.

He performed with the Seattle Repertory Theatre in Washington. In 1970, he made his Broadway debut as Brabantio in Othello. In 1971, Sommer played the Defense in the original production of Friar Daniel Berrigan's The Trial of the Catonsville Nine (1971) based upon the real-life Catonsville Nine. Gregory Peck later produced a 1972 film adaptation, The Trial of the Catonsville Nine based on the play. Also during the 1970s, Sommer's Broadway roles and performances include Dr. Karl Yaeger in Jack Horrigan's thriller Children! Children! directed by Joseph Hardy (1972), Nikolai Skrobotov in Maxim Gorky's play Enemies (1972), Antonio in Shakespeare's play The Merchant of Venice (1973), Schmidt in by Erich Maria Remarque's Full Circle directed by Otto Preminger (1973), Arnold J. Pilger in Peter Ustinov's original comedy Who's Who in Hell (1974), Michael Cristofer's original award-winning drama The Shadow Box (1977), and Francis in the musical play Spokesong (1979). In 1980 he played Clifton A. Feddington in the original musical The 1940's Radio Hour, and Dr. Michael Emerson in the revival of Brian Clark's drama Whose Life is it Anyway? Sommer also played The Reverend Lionel Espy in the original production of Racing Demon (1995).

Sommer won Obie Awards for his off-Broadway performances in Lydie Breeze (1982) and Václav Havel's semi-autobiographical play Largo Desolato (1986). He also appeared off-Broadway at Lincoln Center's Mitzi E. Newhouse Theater as Blair in the 1994 revision of Tom Stoppard's play Hapgood. In 1991, Sommer was nominated for a Drama Desk Award for Outstanding Featured Actor in a Play for his role in Hamlet.

Film

Sommer made his film debut in Dirty Harry (1971), followed by roles in The Stepford Wives (1975), The Front (1976), Close Encounters of the Third Kind (1977), Reds (1981), and Still of the Night in 1982. That same year, he was the narrator in Sophie's Choice. He appeared in Silkwood (1983), Peter Weir's thriller Witness (1985) opposite Harrison Ford (where he played a dirty cop), and Target (1985). In 1988, Sommer played the lead role opposite Sylvia Kristel, as the film noir-esque detective in the quirky horror comedy Dracula's Widow. He then appeared in Shadows and Fog (1991). In 1992, he played the eponymous role of Gerald Ducksworth in The Mighty Ducks, a kind-hearted benefactor of inner city youth hockey, who sends his best lawyer to coach the team and donates funds for rink time, safe equipment and proper uniforms. In the film, Gerald Ducksworth is the founder of both the fictional District 5 Ducks and NHL Anaheim Ducks teams. He then appeared in Malice (1993), Nobody's Fool (1994), Patch Adams (1998), and X-Men: The Last Stand (2006).

Television

On television Sommer appeared in the role of Roy Mills on The Guiding Light (1974), and played George Barton in the 1983 television adaptation of Agatha Christie's Sparkling Cyanide. He played President Gerald Ford opposite Gena Rowlands in the television film The Betty Ford Story (1987). He had starring roles in the short-lived series, Hothouse (1988) and Under Cover (1991). In 1989, Sommer guest starred on the CBS action drama The Equalizer as master wargame villain Ernest Rasher in the episode "Endgame."

He has a daughter Maria, and has a sister Maria, and a brother Sebastian

== Filmography ==
=== Film ===
- 1971: Dirty Harry – District Attorney William T. Rothko
- 1972: The Witches of Salem: The Horror and the Hope (Short) – Proctor
- 1974: Man on a Swing – Pete Russell
- 1975: The Stepford Wives – Ted Van Sant
- 1977: Close Encounters of the Third Kind – Larry Butler
- 1978: Oliver's Story – Dr. Dienhart
- 1980: Hide in Plain Sight – Jason R. Reid
- 1981: Absence of Malice – McAdam
- 1981: Reds – State Department Official
- 1981: Rollover – Roy Lefcourt
- 1982: Hanky Panky – Adrian Pruitt
- 1982: Still of the Night – George Bynum
- 1982: Sophie's Choice – Narrator (voice)
- 1983: Independence Day – Sam Taylor
- 1983: Silkwood – Max Richter
- 1984: Iceman – Whitman
- 1985: Witness – Chief Paul Schaeffer
- 1985: D.A.R.Y.L. – Dr. Jeffrey Stewart
- 1985: Target – Taber
- 1987: The Rosary Murders – Lieutenant Koznicki
- 1988: Dracula's Widow – Lannon
- 1989: Chances Are – Judge Fenwick
- 1989: Forced March – Father
- 1989: Bloodhounds of Broadway – Waldo Winchester
- 1991: Shadows and Fog – Priest
- 1992: The Mighty Ducks – Gerald Ducksworth
- 1993: Malice – Lester Adams
- 1994: Nobody's Fool – Clive Peoples Jr.
- 1995: Strange Days – LAPD Commissioner Palmer Strickland
- 1995: Moonlight and Valentino – Thomas Trager
- 1996: The Chamber – Phelps Bowen
- 1998: The Proposition – Father Dryer
- 1998: Bulworth – Doctor (uncredited)
- 1998: Lulu on the Bridge – Peter Shine (deleted scene) (uncredited)
- 1998: Patch Adams – Dr. Eaton
- 2000: The Next Best Thing – Richard Whittaker
- 2000: Shaft – Curt Fleming
- 2000: The Family Man – Peter Lassiter
- 2002: The Sum of All Fears – Senator Jessup
- 2002: Searching for Paradise – Carl Greenslate
- 2006: The Elephant King – Bill Hunt
- 2006: X-Men: The Last Stand – The President
- 2007: The Invasion – Dr. Henryk Belicec
- 2008: Stop-Loss – Senator Orton Worrell
- 2010: The Other Guys – District Attorney Radford (uncredited)

=== Television ===
Josef Sommer television credits
Year	Title	Role	Notes	Ref.
1973–1974	The Doctors	Dave Davis	23 episodes	
1974	The Guiding Light	Roy Mills		
1974-1990	Great Performances	Nikolai/Polonius	2 episodes	
1975	Valley Forge	Brigadier General 'Dusty' Varnum	TV movie	
1976	The Adams Chronicles	Charles Lee	Episode: "Chapter VI: John Adams, President"	
1977	The Andros Targets	Benson Fischer	Episode: "The Killing of a Porno Queen"	
1978	Another World	Rev. Higley	1 episode	
1979	The Scarlet Letter	Nathaniel Hawthorne	Miniseries	
1983	Sparkling Cyanide	George Barton	TV movie	
1985	I Had Three Wives	McWilliams	Episode: "Runaround Sue"	
1985	The Execution of Raymond Graham	Jim Neal	TV Movie	
1986	Screen Two	James Angelton	Episode: "Double Image"	
1986	Scarecrow and Mrs. King	Raoul Nesbitt	Episode: "Needs to Know"	
1987	American Playhouse	Doc	Episode: "The Wide Net"	
1988	Hothouse	Dr. Sam Garrison	7 episodes	
1989	Bionic Showdown: The Six Million Dollar Man and the Bionic Woman	Charles Estiman	TV movie	
1989	The Equalizer	Ernest Rasher	Episode: "Endgame"	
1990	The Kennedys of Massachusetts	Franklin D. Roosevelt	Miniseries	
1991	A Woman Named Jackie	Joseph P. Kennedy Jr.	Miniseries	
1992	Citizen Cohn	Albert Cohn	TV movie	
1993	The Young Indiana Jones Chronicles	President Woodrow Wilson	Episode: "Paris, May 1919"	
1996-2000	Law & Order	Judge Lawrence Hellman/Defence Attorney Patrick Rumsey	2 episodes	
1997	Early Edition	John Dobbs	2 episodes	
2000	Law & Order: Special Victims Unit	Defence Attorney Patrick Rumsey	Episode: "Entitled" Part 2	
2002	Benjamin Franklin	Cotton Mather	TV miniseries	
2003	Law & Order: Criminal Intent	Spencer Durning	Episode: "Cold Comfort"	
2004	The West Wing	Steve Gaines	Episode: "Slow News Day"	
