= Downstream (2010 film) =

- Directed by: Simone Bartesaghi
- Written by: Philip Kim
- Starring: Jonathon Trent; Elizabeth Roberts; Jonno Roberts; Lenny Von Dohlen; Billy Drago; Joseph Whipp; Mickey Jones
- Cinematography: Brayton Austin
- Edited by: Brandon Driscoll-Luttringer; Aaron Peak
- Music by: Tree Adams
- Release date: February 24, 2010
- Running time: 101 minutes
- Country: United States
- Language: English
- Budget: $1 million

Downstream is a 2010 post-apocalyptic film that takes place in a near-future dystopia where gasoline is scarce and a drifter tries to reach a rumored utopian city, Plutopia, powered by clean energy. The film is directed by Simone Bartesaghi and co-directed, written, and produced by Philip Y. Kim.

== Plot ==
Wes Keller is a young man living in a dystopian future where the collapse of the oil industry and food supplies, along with rising cancer rates among women, has caused a severe decline in the female population. Society has become violent and lawless, with biofuel, batteries, ammunition, and people serving as forms of currency while marauders roam the land. Wes sets out in search of Plutopia, a mythical society powered by cold fusion that may exist only in his imagination. The story follows his journey as he confronts the consequences of society's collapse and attempts to escape its harsh reality.

== Cast ==
- Jonathon Trent as Wes
- Elizabeth Roberts as Sara
- Jonno Roberts as Tobias
- Fiona Gubelmann as Tabitha
- Lenny Von Dohlen as Elder Daniel
- Billy Drago as Edward
- Joseph Whipp as Joe "Hungry Joe"
- Mickey Jones as Food Vendor
- Emilien De Falco as "Frenchy"
