= Mickey Rowe =

American author

- Born: August 19, 1988 (age 38); Seattle, Washington, U.S.
- Occupations: Author, actor, and speaker
- Known for: First autistic actor to play the lead role in the Tony Award Winning play The Curious Incident of the Dog in the Night-Time. Autistic and legally blind author of the award-winning best-selling book Fearlessly Different. Founding Artistic Director of the National Disability Theatre.
- Website: https://mickeyrowe.com/

Mickey Rowe is an American author of the award-winning best-selling book Fearlessly Different: An Autistic Actor's Journey to Broadway's Biggest Stage and the first autistic actor to play the lead role in the Tony award-winning play The Curious Incident of the Dog in the Night-Time. He was the Founding Artistic Director of the National Disability Theatre.

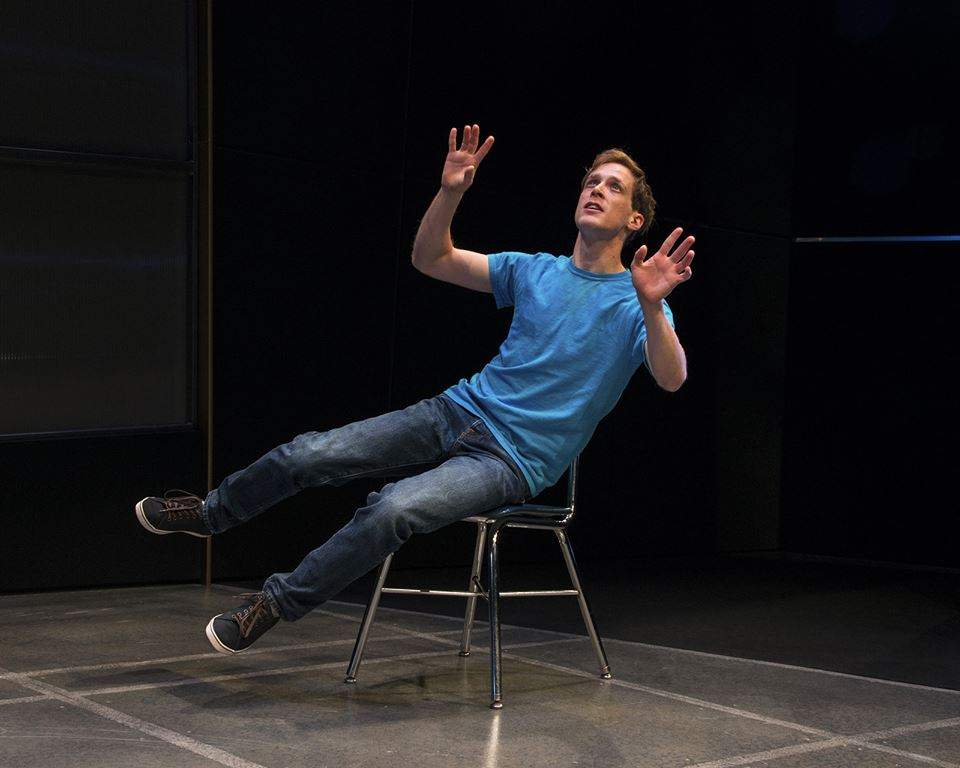
Mickey Rowe in Rehearsal for Curious Incident

== Biography ==
Mickey grew up in Seattle and studied drama at the University of Washington. He performed as an actor at the Gershwin Theater, Syracuse Stage and Indiana Repertory Theatre. He is also a public speaker and was the founding artistic director of National Disability Theatre.

Mickey is the first autistic actor to have played Christopher Boone in the Tony Award winning play The Curious Incident of the Dog in the Night-Time in 2017. This made Mickey one of the first openly autistic actors to play an autistic character. He landed the title role in the Tony Award winning play Amadeus.

He wrote the award-winning best-selling book Fearlessly Different: An Autistic Actor's Journey to Broadway's Biggest Stage.

Mickey has keynoted for companies including Pfizer, TD Bank, Casella, BrightHouse, The Gershwin Theatre on Broadway, The International Council on Development and Learning, Yale University, Columbia University, The New York Public Library, The Kennedy Center, Metropolitan Opera, Lincoln Center for the Performing Arts, and New York City Ballet.

== Awards ==
1. Washington State Book Awards
2. D-30 Disability Impact List honoree 2022 (incredible leaders with disabilities).
3. LitHubs Best Audio Books of April
4. AudioFile's Earphone Award Winner for best Audio Book
5. Pathfinder Award for highest alumni honor in 2021
6. Syracuse Area Live Theater (SALT) Award for Leading Actor in a Play in 2018
7. Winner of the 2017 Christopher Reeve Scholarship, Media Access Awards.
8. Stage Directors and Choreographers Society's (SDC) Top Ten “Standout Moments” recognition 2017–2018
