= Free Fall (1999 film) =

- Australian DVD cover
- Genre: Action
- Teleplay by: Ken Wheat; Jim Wheat
- Story by: Mark Homer
- Directed by: Mario Azzopardi
- Starring: Jaclyn Smith; Bruce Boxleitner; Scott Wentworth; Hannes Jaenicke; Hayden Christensen
- Music by: Ian Christian Nickus
- Countries of origin: United States; Canada; Germany
- Original language: English

Production
- Executive producers: Michael Sloan; Orly Adelson; Lance H. Robbins
- Producer: Gavin Mitchell
- Cinematography: Rhett Morita
- Editor: Mike Lee
- Running time: 89 minutes
- Production companies: Saban International; Falling Productions Inc

Original release
- Network: Fox Family Channel
- Release: January 8, 1999

Free Fall is a 1999 action television film directed by Mario Azzopardi and written by Ken and Jim Wheat, based on a story by Mark Homer. The film stars Jaclyn Smith, Bruce Boxleitner, Scott Wentworth, Hannes Jaenicke and Hayden Christensen. It documents an unusual series of crashes involving sabotaged airliners. It aired on Fox Family Channel on January 8, 1999.

== Plot ==
After Trans Regional Airlines is hit by a series of mysterious aircraft crashes, National Transportation Safety Board safety expert Renee Brennan calls for the grounding of the airline's aircraft, despite opposition from the CEO of the airline, Richard Pierce. Her plans are thwarted by current boyfriend Mark Ettinger, a Federal Aviation Administration inspector who repeatedly countermands her orders. At the latest crash scene, Renee receives a call from a "fan" who appreciates her work and asks if she appreciates his. She then realizes that the crashes are the work of a madman.

After Mark is himself killed in a crash, Renee and FBI agent Scott Wallace track down the saboteur, Michael Ives, a former pilot seeking revenge against the airline for labeling a fatal plane crash in Seattle, piloted by his wife Karen, as pilot error. The pair are themselves caught in a trap the killer set for them at 33,000 feet.

== Cast ==
- Jaclyn Smith as Renee Brennan
- Bruce Boxleitner as Mark Ettinger
- Scott Wentworth as Scott Wallace
- Hannes Jaenicke as Michael Ives
- Hayden Christensen as Patrick Brennan
- Nigel Bennett as Donald Caldwell
- Chad Everett as Richard Pierce
- Brett Halsey as Chief of Security Tom Mason
- Tanja Reichert as Stewardess Holly Nesbitt
- Robyn Stevan as Polly James
- Philip Craig as Captain Markham
- Rod Wilson as Captain Meyers
- Paul Hubbard as Co-Pilot
- Anne Ross as Stewardess Janet Reardon
- Lori Hallier as Stewardess Kelly Mason
- Kate Trotter as Widow
- Brett Porter as Hutchings
- Maria Syrgiannis as Karen Ives
- Kirk Dunn as Flight Controller Dawson
- Peter Van Wart as Frank Greene

== Production ==
Although the caption indicates "National Airport Washington, DC", the scene is actually Toronto Pearson's old Terminal 1.

Free Fall was filmed by Falling Productions Inc on locations in Toronto, at Toronto Pearson International Airport's old Terminal 1 and in Uxbridge, Ontario. The use of stock footage of airliners is evident. The crash scenes including the first crash is edited from Fearless (1993), while scenes from Miracle Landing (1990) are also used. The primary aircraft flown by "Trans Regional Airlines" is an Airbus A320, although the shots of cockpits and interiors are from other aircraft. Other aircraft that are seen include a Learjet 35, Boeing 737 and Lockheed L-1011 TriStar.

The film aired on Fox Family Channel in the U.S. on January 8, 1999, with 1999 releases in Italy as Freefall - Panico ad alta quota (later broadcast on Rai 1 in 2008), in Germany as Angst über den Wolken. The film had its video premiere in Spain in 2000, followed by video releases in France as Crashes en série, Germany as Freefall: Todesflug 1301, Japan, and New Zealand. It had its television premiere in Sweden on February 19, 2007.

== Reception ==
Free Fall was considered a typical "made-for-television" production, and received decidedly mixed reviews. Film reviewer Hal Erickson simply called the film, "Made for cable." Film reviewer Sergio Ortego said Free Fall "deserves no more than 3 out of 10." He further commented: "This film was indeed very poorly made ... a complete flop, with ridiculous special effects, bad acting, terrible one-liner dialogs, and nearly impossible plotlines, or shall I say, plotholes."
