= Joseph Whipp =

American actor

Joseph Whipp is an American actor. In film, he is best known for his work in the horror genre, having had supporting roles as Sgt. Parker in A Nightmare on Elm Street (1984), Dr. Lido Moray in Death Spa (1988), and Sheriff Burke in Scream (1996).

In television, Whipp is known for his work on soap operas. He had recurring roles as Lou, Thug, and Santa Claus on the NBC soap opera Days of Our Lives (1981; 1995–1996), and Charles Mullin on Generations (1989–1990).

== Career ==
Whipp taught drama at Carlmont High School in the 1970s. His first role was as Nicky in the 1973 film The Enforcer. His first credited role was in the 1979 movie Escape from Alcatraz as a prison guard. He later on appeared in the 1984 horror movie A Nightmare on Elm Street as a cop and the 1987 science fiction movie The Hidden. He also starred in the 1996 hit horror movie Scream as a sheriff as well as the 1989 horror video classic Death Spa as the ill-fated paranormal investigator Dr. Lido Moray. His most recent film is in the 2010 movie Downstream.

Whipp has starred in the soap operas Generations as Charles Mullen from 1989 to 1990, and on General Hospital as Marty in 1991. He has made many guest appearances on television series, including Lou Grant, The Dukes of Hazzard, Golden Girls, Night Court, Cheers, ER, Monk and The Middle.

== Filmography ==
=== Film ===
Year	Title	Role	Notes
1973	Magnum Force	Palancio's Hitter	Uncredited
1979	Escape from Alcatraz	Guard	
1982	Wrong Is Right	John Brown	
1983	Second Thoughts	Jailer	
1984	Body Rock	Donald	
1984	A Nightmare on Elm Street	Sgt. Parker	
1986	Miracles	L.A. Cop #1	
1986	Amazons	Kalungo	
1986	Scorpion	Leese's aide	
1987	Disorderlies	Cop #1	
1987	Rampage	Dr. George Mahon	
1987	The Hidden	Dr. Rogers	
1988	Death Spa	Dr. Lido Moray	
1992	The Nutt House	Doctor Foster	
1996	Scream	Sheriff Burke	
1997	Suicide Kings	Harry	
1997	The Midas Touch	Guard	
1998	Get a Job	Pops	
1998	A Place Called Truth	Sheriff Roy	
1999	Winding Roads	Larry Riddle	
2000	Southstreet Lullaby	Smiley	
2003	The Job	The Man	
2006	The Gold Bracelet	-	
2010	World's End	Hungry Joe	
2011	Still Screaming: The Ultimate Scary Movie Retrospective	Himself	Documentary film
2019	Stray	Davis	

=== Television ===
Year	Title	Role	Notes
1973	The Streets of San Francisco	Taylor / Jim	2 episodes
1980	Rage!	Resident #8	Television film
1980	Lou Grant	Belson	Episode: "Libel"
1981	Please Don't Hit Me, Mom	Coach Egan	Television film
1981	Advice to the Lovelorn	Tom Moore	Television film
1981	The Greatest American Hero	Sheriff	Episode: "The Lost Diablo"
1981, 1984	The Dukes of Hazzard	Eddie Hollis / Mason	2 episodes
1981; 1995–1996	Days of Our Lives	Lou / Thug / Santa Claus	27 episodes
1982	Between Two Brothers	Sergeant	Television film
1982	T. J. Hooker	Carl Taub	Episode: "The Witness"
1983	This Girl for Hire	Cop	Television film
1984	Blue Thunder	Gil Franzen	Episode: "A Clear and Present Danger"
1984	Hunter	Detective	Episode: "The Hot Grounder"
1984	Hill Street Blues	Pit Boss	Episode: "Fuched Again"
1984	Scarecrow and Mrs. King	Vardosk	Episode: "A Class Act"
1985	Moonlighting	Investigator #2	Episode: "Pilot"
1985	Highway to Heaven	Robert St. Johns	2 episodes
1985	Chiller	Detective	Television film
1985	The Twilight Zone	Doug Seaver	Episode: "Wordplay"
1985	Stir Crazy	Herman	Episode: "The Football Story"
1985	Santa Barbara	Doctor	Episode #1.331
1986	Cheers	Jack Dalton	Episode: "Fear Is My Co-Pilot"
1986	Cagney & Lacey	Molina	Episode: "The Zealot"
1987	Square One Television	Buck Clyde	Episode #1.2
1987	Mathnet	Buck Clyde	Episode: "The Problem of the Missing Monkey"
1987	The Golden Girls	Dr. Gordon W. Taylor	Episode: "Whose Face Is This, Anyway?"
1987	Nutcracker: Money, Madness and Murder	Klein	3 episodes
1987	Police Story: The Freeway Killings	Gene Benson	Television film
1987	Werewolf	Detective	Episode: "Blood Ties"
1988	Frank's Place	Coach Hughes	Episode: "The Recruiting Game"
1988	21 Jump Street	Sheriff	Episode: "Cory and Dean Got Married"
1989	Father Dowling Mysteries	Tom Fremont	2 episodes
1989	Beauty and the Beast	Bill Edwards	Episode: "What Rough Beast"
1989–1990	Generations	Charles Mullin	24 episodes
1990	The New Lassie	Cal	Episode: "Snake Pit"
1990	Night Court	Dreg of Society	Episode: "A Family Affair: Part 1"
1991	Absolute Strangers	Doctor #2	Television film
1991	Switched at Birth	Dr. Peter Ter Horst	Miniseries
1991	General Hospital	Marty	Episode #1.7232
1991	China Beach	Top	Episode: "Hello Goodbye"
1992	The Wonder Years	Mr. Quaranta	Episode: "Private Butthead"
1992	Parker Lewis Can't Lose	Railroad Executive	Episode: "Diner '75"
1992	A Message from Holly	Driver	Television film
1993	The Adventures of Brisco County, Jr.	U.S. Marshal	Episode: "Crystal Hawks"
1994	Red Shoe Diaries	Rebecca's husband	Episode: "Mercy"
1994, 1998	Melrose Place	Captain / Contractor	2 episodes
1995	Sharon's Secret	Seargeant	Television film
1995	Deadly Games	Captain	2 episodes
1996	Home Improvement	Kendall	Episode "Engine and a Haircut, Two Fights"
1996	Weird Science	General	Episode: "By the Time We Got to Woodstock..."
1996	Too Something	Man Buying Sculpture	Episode: "Donny's Mother"
1996	The Tomorrow Man	Security Chief	Television film
1996	Profiler	Inspector Donnegan	Episode: "I'll Be Watching You"
1996	Beverly Hills, 90210	Fire Captain	Episode: "Fearless"
1996	Dark Skies	General Thompson	Episode: "Ancient Future"
1996, 1998	Diagnosis: Murder	Patrick Norton / Bus Driver	2 episodes
1997	NYPD Blue	Lou Garvey	Episode: "Is Paris Burning?"
1997	Spy Game	Admiral Shaw	Episode: "You Just Can't Trust Anybody These Days"
1997	Pacific Blue	Joe Kelly	Episode: "Ties That Bind"
1997	Brooklyn South	B.C. Commander Stampp	Episode: "Pilot"
1998	Baywatch	Captain Bob	Episode: "To the Max"
2000	Providence	Shelter Employee	2 episodes
2001	Black Scorpion	Man #1	Episode: "No Sweat"
2001	ER	Alan	Episode: "Start All Over Again"
2003	Lizzie McGuire	Grubby Longjohn	Episode: "Grubby Longjohn's Olde Tyme Revue"
2004	Monk	Heavyset Detective	Episode: "Mr. Monk and the Paperboy"
2005	Ordinary Miracles	Doctor	Television film
2009, 2010	The Middle	Mike's boss	2 episodes
2011	Scream: The Inside Story	Himself	Documentary film
2012	Last Man Standing	Ron	Episode: "Ed's Twice Ex-Wife"
2014	NCIS	Old Man	Episode: "Alleged"
2014	Criminal Minds	Oren Farland	Episode: "Amelia Porter"
2020	The Young and the Restless	George	2 episodes
2022	Gaslit	Farmer	Episode: "King George"
2022	Grown-ish	Old Man	Episode: "You Don't Know Me"
