= Hothouse (TV series) =

American medical drama television series

- Genre: Medical drama
- Created by: Jay Presson Allen
- Starring: Josef Sommer; Alexis Smith; Art Malik; Michael Learned
- Country of origin: United States
- Original language: English
- No. of seasons: 1
- No. of episodes: 7

Production
- Executive producer: Jay Presson Allen
- Cinematography: Misha Suslov
- Running time: 60 minutes
- Production companies: Annabrooke Productions; Lorimar Television

Original release
- Network: ABC
- Release: June 30 – August 25, 1988

Hothouse is an American medical drama television series that aired on ABC from June 30 to August 25, 1988. The series aired on Thursday Nights at 10:00 PM (EST). Hothouse was cancelled because of low ratings.

== Plot ==
The series was about a psychiatric clinic run by a family in Boston.

== Cast ==
- Josef Sommer as Dr. Sam Garrison
- Alexis Smith as Lily Garrison Shannon
- Art Malik as Dr. Ved Lahari
- Michael Learned as Dr. Marie Teller
- Louise Latham as Louise Dougherty
- Katherine Borowitz as Issy Garrison Schrader
- Bob Gunton as Leonard Schrader
- Tony Soper as Matt Garrison
- Susan Diol as Claudia Garrison
- Michael Jeter as Dr. Art Makter
- Maureen Moore as Lucy Cox

== Episodes ==
No.	Title	Directed by	Written by	Original release date
1	"The Good Family"	Stephen Gyllenhaal	Nina Shengold	June 30, 1988
The wife of a sheriff is a kleptomaniac. A social worker feels that a patient is after her.
2	"The Subject of Sex"	Stephen Gyllenhaal	Donald Margulies	July 7, 1988
Matt and Claudia counts the months until the birth of their baby. Ved thinks Marie shows a lack of commitment. Sam is set up on a blind date.
3	"The Actress"	Jeff Bleckner	Jay Presson Allen	July 14, 1988
An actress has a breakdown on the set of a movie.
4	"Nancy: Part 1"	William Hays	Unknown	July 28, 1988
A 16-year-old patient of Art reminds him of a girl he had a crush on. Claudia and Lily's friendship blossoms.
5	"Nancy: Part 2"	William Hays	Unknown	August 4, 1988
Ved talks to Art about his intense feelings for a patient. Marie don't know how to get through to Jakie.
6	"His Mother"	Jonathan Sanger	Unknown	August 11, 1988
Marie wants Jakie's mother to come to the center. Claudia complains about having no privacy.
7	"Love and Taxes"	Jonathan Sanger	Jeffrey Sweet	August 25, 1988
Sam wants his son to move back home from London.

== Production ==
Jay Presson Allen tried to recapture the success of Family with Hothouse for ABC in 1988; the drama about the lives and work experiences of the staff of a mental hospital lasted eight episodes. Personally, Allen thought it was some of her best work, though its short life was a mixed blessing for her, said Allen: "Unfortunately, ABC didn't have the courage of their initial convictions. They skewered it, they turned tail on it. However if they had picked it up, I'd have had to turn out 26 episodes. I'd be in Forest Lawn now. Television is a killer. It is really not for sissies."

== Bibliography ==
- Gardner, Ralph (January 1991). "Jay Presson Allen: Who would rather write". Cosmopolitan.
