= Dracula's Widow =

1988 film by Christopher Coppola

Dracula’s Widow
- Directed by: Christopher Coppola
- Written by: Kathryn Ann Thomas; Christopher Coppola
- Produced by: Stephen Traxler
- Starring: Sylvia Kristel; Josef Sommer; Lenny von Dohlen
- Music by: James B. Campbell
- Release date: 1988
- Running time: 86 minutes
- Country: United States
- Language: English

Dracula’s Widow is a 1988 vampire thriller film directed by Christopher Coppola, written by Tom Blomquist as Kathryn Ann Thomas, and starring Sylvia Kristel, Josef Sommer and Lenny von Dohlen. Kristel, in the title role, goes on a killing spree in a seedy 1980s Hollywood, while in search of her husband.

== Plot ==
The film, situated in Hollywood, or Tinsel Town as the narrator (Lt. Lannon) calls it, opens with Raymond Everett (the owner of the Hollywood House of Wax) receiving delivery of some valuable antiques from Poenari, Romania. He anxiously takes delivery of a sixth crate even though he was only expecting five. Later that evening, at a Jazz bar called The Blue Angel, a sleazy but lonely patron hits on a mysterious dark-haired woman who wanders in. Soon after, they leave together and travel to a secluded park where this peculiar woman kills the man.

More shenanigans ensue that night when two thieves break into the wax museum while Raymond is upstairs watching Nosferatu. During the robbery, a creature with webbed hands and dagger-like nails attacks one of the thieves. The thief’s throat is ripped open, and his blood is drained by a long tentacle emitted from the creature’s mouth. The other man escapes. Following this attack, the mysterious brunette from earlier enters the room where Raymond sits unsuspectingly. After a very short battle of wills, Raymond is taken possession of (with a bite) and forced to renounce his girlfriend, Jenny Harker.

The next day, Lt. Lannon and his partner Citrano are called to the crime scene at the park. A clue left in the grass leads them to The Blue Angel, in which witnesses are unable to contribute much. Meanwhile, Raymond tries to free himself from the vampire’s hold but fails; instead, he cleans up her mess before Jenny arrives. Raymond’s girlfriend, who also works at the museum, observes his distress. She tries to comfort him, but instead, Raymond tries to bite her, unsuccessfully. As night falls, the creature attacks again. This time it is a night watchman ironically watching a news report about the park murder at the onset of his death.

Summoned by the vampire, Raymond picks her up in his car. She tells him that he must return her to Romania to her husband, Count Dracula. However, Raymond informs her of Count Dracula’s death and that Van Helsing is responsible. At this moment, Raymond’s girlfriend, Jenny, glimpses him in the car with the other woman. The police receive a valuable part of the puzzle from the frazzled burglar who witnessed his accomplice’s death at the wax museum the previous night. Later, through Van Helsing’s aged grandson, we learn that all vampires were destroyed with the exception of Vanessa, who is the true wife of Dracula. She is described as both a beauty and a beast. In a sleazier part of town, Vanessa and Raymond encounter a group of hardcore occultists who seem to sense Vanessa’s evilness and welcome her. She surprises them, though, when she transforms into the beast and slaughters all save Raymond.

The next morning, Jenny angrily confronts Raymond over the phone and then abruptly hangs up. Distressed, Raymond writes a letter confessing his predicament, hoping she will forgive him. Back at the wax museum, Raymond is met by Lt. Lannon, who casually searches the premises. The lieutenant confronts Raymond with the burglar’s admission, which he denies. However, their meeting is cut short when Lannon is called to another of Vanessa’s massacres. There, Lannon meets Van Helsing’s elderly grandson, who tells him that vampires, not devil worshippers are to blame. To establish his theory, they journey to the morgue where Vanessa’s first victim is located. With a wooden stake and mallet, Helsing makes Lannon a believer as the victim is briefly reanimated at the moment of his true death. Later, Lannon visits Jenny hoping to discover more information about Raymond and gain her trust. Jenny afterwards meets up with Raymond, and he gives her a cross to protect her. Night arrives, and more murders follow as Vanessa slays Citrano and Helsing. Consequentially, Raymond is arrested, and his wax museum searched for evidence, which police discover.

While in custody, officers try to elicit a confession from Raymond that does not involve a beautiful vampire monster. However, the only cop who believes him is Lt. Lannon. He and Jenny eventually collaborate to locate Vanessa and exonerate Raymond. As night approaches, Raymond is taken to a vacant warehouse by a few officers for a bit of police brutality. Vanessa intervenes, hoping to eliminate Raymond herself. Jenny, via supernatural intervention, discovers the warehouse. Both she and Lannon are able to distract Vanessa, while Raymond takes the opportunity to kill her, thus regaining his humanity.

== Characters ==
- Sylvia Kristel as Vanessa
- Josef Sommer as Lieutenant Hap Lannon
- Lenny von Dohlen as Raymond Everett
- Marc Coppola as Brad
- Stefan Schnabel as Helsing
- Rachel Jones as Jenny Harker
- Duke Ernsberger as Bart
- G.F. Rowe as Lou
- Richard K. Olsen as The Drunk (credited as Richard Olsen)
- Lucius Houghton as Willie
- J. Michael Hunter as Dave
- Traber Burns as Citrano
- Dick Langdon as Night Watchman
- Adrienne Stout as Babs
- Tracy Tanen as Juliet
