= Elfriede Geiringer =

Second wife of Otto Frank (1905–1998)

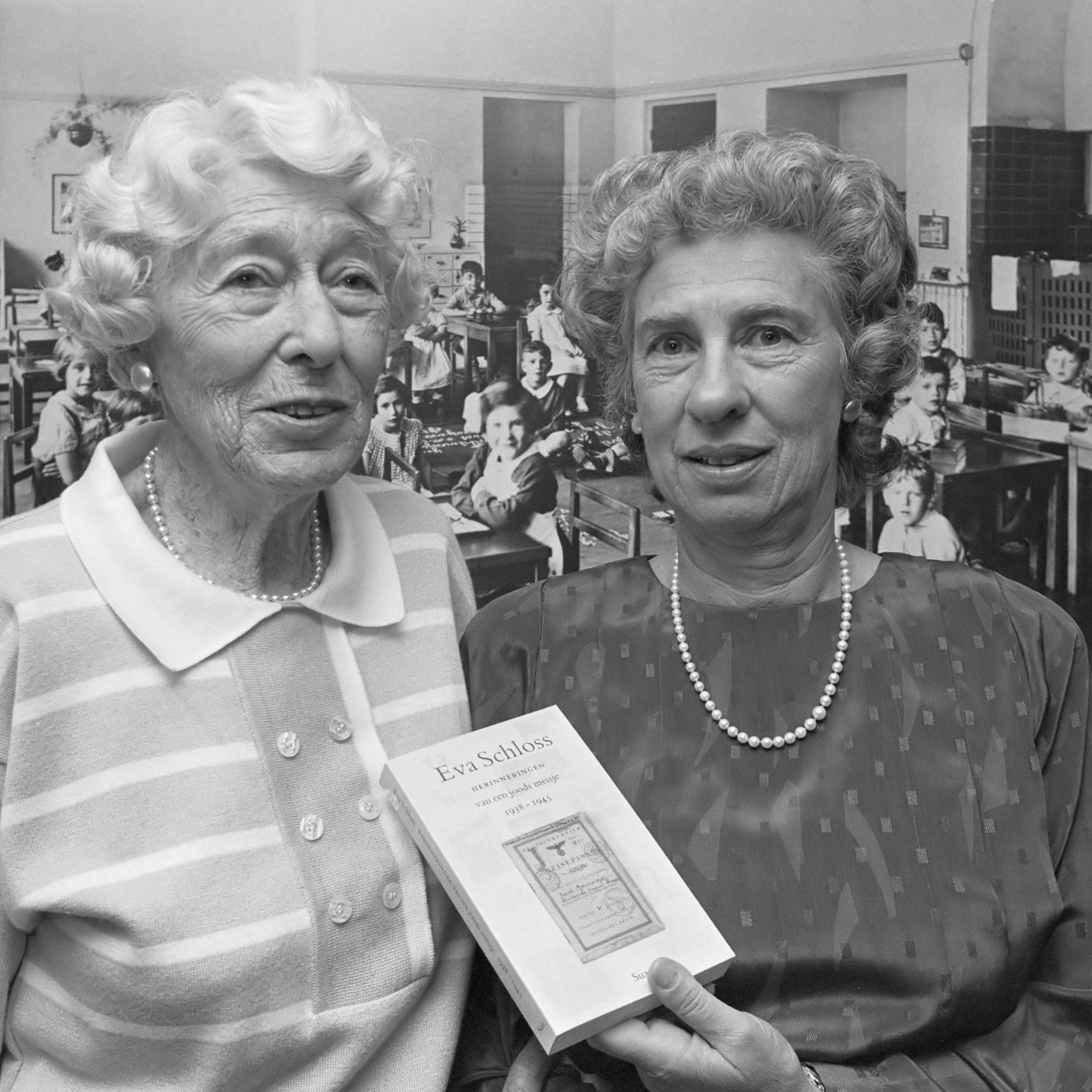
- Geiringer and Eva Schloss in 1989
- Born: Elfriede Markovits; 13 February 1905; Vienna, Austria-Hungary
- Died: 2 October 1998 (aged 93); London, England
- Spouses: Erich Geiringer (m. 1923; died 1945); Otto Frank (m. 1953; died 1980)
- Children: 2, including Eva Schloss

Elfriede Geiringer Frank (née Markovits; 13 February 1905 – 2 October 1998) was the second wife of Otto Frank, who was the father of Anne and Margot Frank. She was a survivor of World War II and the Holocaust.

== Biography ==
=== Early life ===
Elfriede Markovits was born in Vienna in 1905. She married Erich Geiringer and the couple had two children: son Heinz, born in 1926; and daughter Eva, born in 1929. The family fled first to Belgium and then to the Netherlands in 1938, where they settled down as neighbours to the Frank family. Eva and Anne knew each other.

=== Second World War ===
When the Germans invaded the Netherlands and Heinz received a call-up to a work-camp, the family went into hiding. They successfully hid for two years and might have survived the war if they had not been betrayed in May 1944. They were then captured by the Nazis and sent to Auschwitz-Birkenau concentration camp. They were liberated in January 1945 by the Soviets, but Erich and Heinz Geiringer had perished in the forced march to Mauthausen that came just before the war ended. Geiringer and her daughter Eva returned to Amsterdam on 13 June 1945. Otto Frank visited them at their apartment not long after.

=== Later life ===
Geiringer married Otto Frank in November 1953 and settled in Basel, Switzerland. They spent a large part of their time educating people about the importance of Anne Frank's diary and the horrors that the Jews experienced during the Holocaust. Their commitment led to the creation of the Anne Frank House in Amsterdam.

=== Death and since ===
After living long enough to see the birth of five of her great-grandchildren, Elfriede Geiringer died peacefully in her sleep on 2 October 1998 at her home in London. She is buried along with the ashes of her second husband, Otto in Birsfelden's Cemetery.

A memoir by her daughter Eva Schloss, concerning the family's life after the Holocaust, After Auschwitz: A Story of Heartbreak and Survival by the Stepsister of Anne Frank, was published in 2013.
