= Santa Cruz Shakespeare =

Theatre festival in Santa Cruz, California

Coordinates: 37.027773°N 122.039566°W

- Location: Santa Cruz, California
- Founded: 2014
- Founded by: Marco Barricelli, Mike Ryan
- Artistic director: Charles Pasternak
- Type of play: Shakespeare
- Festival date: July through September
- Website: santacruzshakespeare.org

Santa Cruz Shakespeare is an independent theater company in Santa Cruz, California, founded in 2014. Its predecessor, Shakespeare Santa Cruz, lost the financial support of its host and sponsor, the University of California, Santa Cruz in 2013. Members of the original company and board immediately began fundraising and raised enough money to form a new independent theater company. Santa Cruz Shakespeare values community, aesthetics, financial responsibility, inclusivity, inquisitiveness, and engagement through repertory theater, educational programs, and professionalism in the entertainment/theater fields.

== History ==
- 1981-2008: Shakespeare Santa Cruz was founded by Audrey Stanley in 1981 and performed annually on the campus of the University of California, Santa Cruz (UCSC). Plays by Shakespeare (and others) were performed both indoors on the UCSC Theater Arts Mainstage and outdoors in the Sinsheimer-Stanley Festival Glen. Usually, the company's season ran from July to early September and presented three or four plays that ran concurrently in repertory. Over time, the company ran up deficits, which were paid by the University of California.
- 2008: With California's budget crisis having resulted in reduced funding, the university could no longer afford to cover the accrued debts. An agreement was reached that if the theater could raise $300,000, it could continue operation. Within 10 days of the agreement's announcement, over $400,000 was raised.
- 2013: Claiming continuing financial problems, the UCSC Arts Division dean announced that Shakespeare Santa Cruz would end after that year's winter holiday production.
- 2013: Following this announcement, members of the theater company began a campaign to raise money to become an independent company. In December 2013, a new entity known as Shakespeare Play On was formed for this purpose, co-headed by Shakespeare Santa Cruz artistic director Marco Baricelli and actor/director Mike Ryan. An online platform for accepting donations was established with the Network for Good. By February 2014, they raised over $1 million (USD) through crowdfunding to continue on without the financial support of the university. In March 2014, the new company changed its name to Santa Cruz Shakespeare. The New York Times referred to the company's rebirth as an "underdog success story."
- 2014: For its inaugural season under its new arrangement, Santa Cruz Shakespeare presented As You Like It, The Merry Wives of Windsor, and The Beard of Avon in July and August 2014. All three shows were performed in the Sinsheimer-Stanley Festival Glen on UCSC's campus.
- 2015: For the 2015 season Mike Ryan took over sole artistic director duties and the company announced productions of Much Ado About Nothing, Macbeth, and David Ives's adaptation of Pierre Corneille's The Liar.
- 2016: For the 2016 season the company moved to a new purpose-built home in the Audrey Stanley Grove at Upper DeLaveaga Park in Santa Cruz.
- 2022: Mike Ryan announced his plan to step down as artistic director after the 2023 season. Charles Pasternak was selected as his successor.
- 2023: Mirroring the company's first year where Mike Ryan and Marco Baricelli shared the artistic director title, Mike Ryan and Charles Pasternak were Co-Artistic Directors for the 2023 season.
- 2024: Charles Pasternak leads his first season as sole Artistic Director, He launches the fall season with The Glass Menagerie and brings back Holiday programming with A Christmas Carol
- 2025: SCS introduces the "Monday Night Revels" a series of performances on otherwise dark evenings at the theater, featuring cover/tribute bands, comedians and Drag performances.
- 2026: SCS launches the Spring season with Vincent and expands the fall season to two shows performed in repertory.

== Season history ==
- 2014
  - As You Like It
  - The Merry Wives of Windsor
  - The Beard of Avon (intern production)
- 2015
  - Much Ado About Nothing
  - Macbeth
  - The Liar
  - The Rover (intern production)
- 2016 (Inaugural season in the Audrey Stanley Grove at Upper DeLaveaga Park)
  - Hamlet
  - A Midsummer Night's Dream
  - Orlando (intern production)
- 2017
  - Measure for Measure
  - Two Gentlemen of Verona
  - The 39 Steps
  - Candide (intern production)
- 2018
  - Summer Season
    - Love's Labour's Lost
    - Romeo and Juliet
    - Venus in Fur
  - Fringe Series
    - Men I'm Not Married To (intern production)
    - A Doll's House (staged reading)
    - The Taming (staged reading)
- 2019
  - Summer Season
    - Pride and Prejudice
    - The Comedy of Errors
    - The Winter's Tale
  - Fringe Series
    - The Two Noble Kinsmen (intern production)
    - The Formula by Kathryn Chetkovich (staged reading)
    - The Last White Man (staged reading)
- 2020
  - Henry VI Part I (Undiscovered Shakespeare online reading via Zoom)
  - Henry VI Part II (Undiscovered Shakespeare online reading via Zoom)
  - Henry VI Part III (Undiscovered Shakespeare online reading via Zoom)
  - Richard III (Undiscovered Shakespeare online reading via Zoom)
  - The originally planned Season was Postponed to 2021 due to the COVID-19 pandemic. Instead, SCS produced 4 plays as online staged readings with each play broken into multiple performances over a series of weeks.
- 2021
  - The ongoing COVID-19 pandemic once again impacted the season, leading to the further postponement of the plays originally planned for 2020.
  - Undiscovered Shakespeare (collaboration with UCSC Humanities)
    - Troilus and Cressida (online reading via Zoom)
  - Summer Season
    - The Agitators
    - RII an adaptation of Richard II (play)
  - Fringe Series
    - Far Away From Here by M.L Roberts (staged reading)
    - Wuthering Heights by Kirsten Brandt (staged reading)
- 2022
  - Undiscovered Shakespeare (collaboration with UCSC Humanities)
    - King John (online reading via Zoom)
  - Summer Season
    - Twelfth Night
    - The Tempest
    - The Formula by Kathryn Chetkovich (World Premiere)
  - Fringe Series
    - Just Deserts by Carol Lashoff (intern production)
    - Nasty Brutish and Short by Ian McRae (staged reading)
    - Simply The Thing She is by Kate Hawley (staged reading)
- 2023
  - Summer Season
    - The Taming of the Shrew
    - King Lear
    - The Book of Will
  - Fringe Series
    - Exit, Pursued by a Bear (intern production)
    - Witch by Jen Silverman (staged reading)
    - Master Harold and the Boys by Athol Fugard (staged reading)
- 2024
  - Undiscovered Shakespeare (collaboration with UCSC Humanities)
    - Henry VIII (online reading via Zoom)
  - Summer Season (July–August)
    - Hamlet
    - As You Like It
    - The Importance of Being Earnest
  - Fringe Series (Tuesdays in August)
    - Proof by David Auburn (intern production)
    - Vanya and Sonya and Masha and Spike by Christopher Durang (staged reading)
    - A Room in the Castle by Lauren Gunderson (staged reading)
  - Fall Season
    - The Glass Menagerie (inaugural Fall season, playing in September following the summer season)
  - Holiday Season (Nov-Dec)
    - A Christmas Carol Based on the novel by Charles Dickens
- 2025
  - Undiscovered Shakespeare (collaboration with UCSC Humanities)
    - Timon of Athens (online reading via Zoom)
  - Summer Season (July–August)
    - A Midsummer Night's Dream
    - Pericles
    - Into the Woods
  - Fringe Series (Tuesdays in August)
    - Betrayal (apprentice show)
    - First Gravedigger (staged reading)
    - Mary's Wedding (staged reading)
  - Fall Season
    - Master Harold and the Boys by Athol Fugard
  - Holiday Season (Nov-Dec 2025)
    - A Christmas Carol Based on the novel by Charles Dickens
- 2026
  - Spring Season (April-May)
    - Vincent by Leonard Nimoy
  - Summer Season (July-August)
    - Much Ado About Nothing
    - Macbeth
    - Fences by August Wilson
  - Fringe Series
    - Apprentice Night, a staged reading by the SCS apprentice actors
    - Hay Fever by Noël Coward (Staged reading)
  - Fall Season (September-October)
    - Private Lives by Noël Coward
    - The Last 5 Years by Jason Robert Brown
  - Holiday Season (Nov-Dec)
    - A Christmas Carol Based on the novel by Charles Dickens

== The Canon in Santa Cruz ==
Between Shakespeare Santa Cruz and Santa Cruz Shakespeare all of Shakespeare's canon have been presented. Thirty have had main stage productions, one as a fringe production, and seven as online staged readings.

Shakespeare plays performed in Santa Cruz by first production

- The Taming of the Shrew (1981, 1992, 2004, 2013, 2023)
- A Midsummer Night's Dream (1982, 1991, 2001, 2009, 2016, 2025)
- Macbeth (1983, 1992, 2001, 2015, 2026)
- The Merry Wives of Windsor (1983, 1994, 2002, 2014)
- The Tempest (1984, 1995, 2007, 2022)
- Henry IV, Part 1 (1984, 2011)
- As You Like It (1985,1997, 2006, 2014, 2024)
- Hamlet (1985, 2003, 2016, 2024)
- Richard II (1986, 2021*adaptation*)
- Twelfth Night (1986, 1996, 2005, 2012, 2022)
- Henry V (1987, 2013)
- Much Ado About Nothing (1987, 1998, 2007, 2015, 2026)
- Antony and Cleopatra (1988)
- The Comedy of Errors (1988, 1993, 2003, 2011, 2019)
- Titus Andronicus (1988)
- Love's Labour's Lost (1989, 2000, 2010, 2018)
- Romeo and Juliet (1989, 1999, 2008, 2018)
- Julius Caesar (1988, 2009)
- Othello (1990, 1998, 2010)
- The Winter's Tale (1990, 2005, 2019)
- Measure for Measure (1991, 2017)
- All's Well That Ends Well (1993, 2008)
- The Merchant of Venice (1994)
- King Lear (1995, 2006, 2023)
- Pericles, Prince of Tyre (1996, 2025)
- Richard III (1997, 2020 *Undiscovered Shakespeare online reading)
- The Two Gentlemen of Verona (1999, 2017)
- Cymbeline (2000)
- Coriolanus (2002)
- Henry IV, Part 2 (2012)
- The Two Noble Kinsmen (2019 *Fringe production)
- Henry VI, Part 1 (2020 *Undiscovered Shakespeare online reading)
- Henry VI, Part 2 (2020 *Undiscovered Shakespeare online reading)
- Henry VI, Part 3 (2020 *Undiscovered Shakespeare online reading)
- Troilus and Cressida (2021 *Undiscovered Shakespeare online reading)
- King John (2022 *Undiscovered Shakespeare online reading)
- Henry VIII (2024 *Undiscovered Shakespeare online reading)
- Timon of Athens (2025 *Undiscovered Shakespeare online reading)

== Bibliography ==
- "Inaugural Summer Season Begins July 1 and Runs Through August 10, 2014" (PDF) (Press release). Santa Cruz Shakespeare. 16 June 2014. Archived (PDF) from the original on 11 June 2018.
