= Leaving Normal (film) =

1992 film by Edward Zwick

- Theatrical release poster
- Directed by: Edward Zwick
- Written by: Ed Solomon
- Produced by: Lindsay Doran
- Starring: Christine Lahti; Meg Tilly; Lenny Von Dohlen; James Gammon
- Cinematography: Ralf D. Bode
- Edited by: Victor DuBois
- Music by: W. G. Snuffy Walden
- Production company: Mirage Enterprises
- Distributed by: Universal Pictures
- Release date: April 29, 1992 (USA)
- Running time: 110 minutes
- Country: United States
- Language: English
- Box office: $1.5 million

Leaving Normal is a 1992 American comedy-drama road film directed by Edward Zwick and starring Christine Lahti and Meg Tilly. Written by Ed Solomon, the film is about the cross country adventure of two women and the hardships and characters they encounter.

== Plot ==
Darly Peters is a brassy waitress and former stripper who used to use the stage name Pillow Talk. Darly is on her way to Alaska to claim a home being built for her and return to the family she abandoned eighteen years earlier. She meets Marianne Johnson, a quiet waif who just walked out on her abusive husband. Darly allows Marianne to tag along as they journey across country to Alaska.

Along the way, they meet a collection of colorful characters, including a strange-talking waitress named 66, and Walt, a road guy who recognizes Darly as the former Pillow Talk and wants to pay her big money for sex.

The women finally make it to Alaska, where Darly finds that the house she was expecting to find has never been built. The two set up in a house trailer and, with the Alaskan wilderness as a backdrop, they begin to reevaluate their lives.

== Cast ==
- Christine Lahti as Darly
- Meg Tilly as Marianne
- Lenny Von Dohlen as Harry
- Maury Chaykin as Leon
- Patrika Darbo as 66
- Eve Gordon as Emily
- James Eckhouse as Rich
- Brett Cullen as Kurt
- James Gammon as Walt

== Production ==
Filming locations

- Hyder, Alaska, United States
- Stewart, British Columbia, Canada
- Britannia Beach, British Columbia, Canada
- Vancouver, British Columbia, Canada
- Yoho National Park, British Columbia, Canada

== Reception ==
=== Critical response ===
On the review aggregator website Rotten Tomatoes, 40% of 10 critics' reviews are positive, with an average rating of 4.4/10.

=== Box office ===
Leaving Normal was given a limited theatrical release in the United States and Canada, grossing $1.5 million at the box office.
