= And Then They Came for Me =

Play by James Still

And Then They Came for Me is a play by American author James Still. It is a multimedia production, which combines tapes of interviews with Anne Frank's friends who survived the Holocaust – Ed Silverberg (formerly Helmuth "Hello" Silberberg) and Eva Geiringer Schloss – with live actors recreating the scenes from their lives. It is part oral history, part drama, part remembrance, and is ensemble driven. The title refers to the famous 1946 poem "First they came ..." by Pastor Martin Niemöller.

== Cast ==
- Ed: Born in Germany 1926. Given name is Helmuth Silberberg (nicknamed "Hello"); now uses the name Ed Silverberg. Moved to the Netherlands to escape the Nazis.
- Ed’s Father: Sends Ed to his grandfather in Amsterdam, Netherlands. He went to Belgium.
- Ed’s Mother: Moved to Belgium with Ed’s father.
- Eva: Eva Geiringer Schloss. Born in Austria in 1929, her family moves to Amsterdam in 1940.
- Heinz Geiringer: Eva's brother.
- Mutti Geiringer: Eva's mother.
- Pappy Geiringer: Eva's father. Separates himself and Heinz from the rest of the family because it is easier to hide two people than four.
- Anne Frank: Born in 1929 in Frankfurt, Germany. Her father moves his family to Amsterdam in 1934 after Hitler comes to power.
- SS Border Guards.
- Hitler Youth.
