= The Gold Bracelet =

2023 American English-language film

- Directed by: Kavi Raz
- Screenplay by: Kavi Raz
- Produced by: Inder Dadlani; Kavi Raz
- Starring: Archana Puran Singh; Mehr Hassan
- Cinematography: Jack Conroy; Erick Yates Green
- Edited by: Omi Vaidya
- Music by: Micky Singh Narula; Peter Carl Ganderup
- Release date: 7 October 2008
- Running time: 139 Minutes
- Country: United States
- Language: English

The Gold Bracelet (Punjabi: ਸੋਨੇ ਦਾ ਕੰਗਣ) is an American English-language film written and directed by Kavi Raz. It stars Archana Puran Singh, Mehr Hassan and Angela Little in lead roles. The film was released on 7 October 2008.

== Cast ==
- Archana Puran Singh as Baljit Singh
- Kavi Raz
- Mehr Hassan as Simrun Singh
- Angela Little as Raina
- Ellen Geer as Miss Hanson
- Joseph Whipp
- A. J. Khan as Dancer
- Kumar Pallana as Dinu Bhai
- Ari Barak as Mirza Khan
- Gary Castro Churchwell
- Joseph Bertot as Jose
- Ezra Buzzington as Murderer

== Awards ==
Year	Award	Festival	Result
2006	Best Feature Film	Cinequest Film & Creativity Festival	Won
