= James Still (playwright) =

American writer and playwright (born 1959)

- Born: May 31, 1959 (age 67); Emporia, Kansas, United States
- Education: University of Kansas
- Occupations: Writer; Playwright; Screenwriter
- Partner: Lenny Von Dohlen
- Writing career
- Language: English
- Period: 1990 (approx.)-present
- Genres: Comedy; Drama
- Notable works: The Velocity of Gary; The Little Bear Movie

James Still (born May 31, 1959) is an American writer and playwright.

Still grew up in a small town in Kansas, and graduated from the University of Kansas. His award-winning plays have been produced throughout the United States, Canada, Europe, Japan, China, Australia and South Africa. He is a two-time TCG-Pew Charitable Trusts' National Theatre Artist with the Indiana Repertory Theatre where he was the IRT's first-ever playwright in residence (1998–2024). He currently lives in Los Angeles.

== Biography ==
James Still is an elected member of the National Theatre Conference and a Fellow in the College of Fellows of the American Theatre. He is also a winner of the William Inge Festival's "Otis Guernsey New Voices Playwriting Award", the Todd McNerney National Playwriting Prize at the Piccolo Spoleto Festival, the Orlin Corey Medallion for Sustained Excellence from the Children's Theatre Foundation of America, and the Charlotte B. Chorpenning Playwright Award for Distinguished Body of Work. Three of his plays have received the Distinguished Play Award from the American Alliance for Theatre & Education. His plays have been developed and workshopped at Robert Redford's Sundance Institute Lab, the Eugene O'Neill Theater Center, the New Harmony Project, The Lark, New Visions/New Voices at the Kennedy Center, the Bonderman New Play Symposium, the Perry-Mansfield New Works Festival, the Telluride Playwright's Festival, and the Colorado New Play Summit.

Most recent world premieres of his plays include Before We Forgot How to Dream: April 4, 1968 at Indiana Repertory Theatre (2015) and Appoggiatura at the Denver Center Theatre (2015) and The Widow Lincoln at Ford's Theatre in Washington, D.C. (2015). Others: The House that Jack Built at the Indiana Repertory Theatre. Illegal Use of Hands premiered at American Blues Theater in Chicago. I Love to Eat a solo play about American culinary icon James Beard premiered at the Indiana Repertory Theatre and Portland Center Stage. The Heavens Are Hung In Black reopened the newly renovated Ford's Theatre in Washington D.C., to commemorate the 200th anniversary of Abraham Lincoln's birth. The Velvet Rut premiered at the Unicorn Theatre in Kansas City, Missouri and the Illusion Theatre in Minneapolis. Interpreting William premiered at the Indiana Repertory Theatre. New plays include Miranda. His 10-minute play When Miss Lydia Hinkley Gives a Bird the Bird has had readings at several 10-minute play festivals and was a finalist for the 2015 Heideman Award at Actors Theatre of Louisville.

His other plays include A Long Bridge Over Deep Waters for Cornerstone's Faith-Based Theatre Cycle in Los Angeles (which premiered at the John Anson Ford Amphitheatre), And Then They Came for Me, translated into several languages and produced around the world, -including a command performance at the House of Commons in London, in an event hosted by Vanessa Redgrave- a production by the U.S. Army at a base in Stuttgart, Germany - and a production at the International School in Macau, China. Iron Kisses which premiered at Geva Theatre Center in Rochester, New York and has been produced across the country from Portland Stage in Maine to Company of Fools in Idaho. Searching For Eden which premiered at the American Heartland Theatre in Kansas City and recently ran at The Asolo Repertory Theatre in Florida and at the Edinburgh Festival Theatre in Scotland.

Since its world premiere at the Indiana Repertory Theatre, Looking Over The President's Shoulder has had many productions including Ford's Theatre, Pasadena Playhouse, Vermont Stage Company, Arkansas Repertory Theatre in Little Rock and the Barter Theatre in Virginia. Still also wrote a commissioned short play called Octophobia for the Humana Festival of New American Plays at Actors Theatre of Louisville which the editors of the Smith and Kraus anthologies have published in their "Best Women's Stage Monologues".

Other Plays include Amber Waves (the John F. Kennedy Center for the Performing Arts in Washington, D.C.) which was recently produced in Tokyo and in Flint, Michigan, He Held Me Grand (People's Light and Theatre Company and the IRT), and A Village Fable (based on a novella by John Gardner) which was commissioned by the Mark Taper Forum, premiered at the Honolulu Theatre for Youth, produced at the Children's Theatre Company in Minneapolis, and in Switzerland at the Zurich Young People's Theatre. Hush: An Interview with America was co-commissioned and premiered by Childsplay in Tempe, AZ, and Metro Theater Company in St. Louis and continues to be produced many times a season.

Still's solo performance piece The Velocity of Gary (Not His Real Name) premiered in New York at the Ensemble Studio Theater, and he performed it across the country. It was later produced off-Broadway at the New Conservatory Theatre Center in San Francisco, at the Studio Theatre in Washington, DC, and more recently at Tricklock Productions in Albuquerque, New Mexico. His stage play was later turned into the feature film The Velocity of Gary, for which Still also wrote the screenplay.

Still is also a working director in the theatre and most recently directed productions of Red, The Mystery of Irma Vep, Other Desert Cities, God of Carnage, I Love to Eat, Doubt, Mary's Wedding, Becky's New Car, Rabbit Hole, The Immigrant, Dinner With Friends, and many others at theaters across the country as well as at the Tennessee Williams Festival in New Orleans. Still's work in television and film and has been nominated for five Emmy's, a Television Critics Association Award, and was twice a finalist for the Humanitas Prize. He was a producer/head writer for the series Paz airing daily on both TLC and Discovery Kids.

For Nickelodeon he was the writer and story editor for Maurice Sendak's long-running Little Bear, and the Bill Cosby series Little Bill. He created a new series for Amsterdam-based Telescreen adapted from the Frog books by Max Velthuijs, and he also was one of the screenwriters for The Little Bear Movie. Still wrote the first Dutch-produced feature film for children The Miffy Movie based on Dick Bruna's Miffy books.

Still was in a relationship with actor Lenny Von Dohlen at the time of Von Dohlen's death in 2022.

== Plays ==
- Miranda - Workshop at Fresh Ink 2014, Minneapolis. Commissioned by Illusion Theater, Minneapolis. 2015 Runner-up: 2015 Todd McNerney New Play Prize / Spoleto. Finalist for 2015 Eugene O'Neill Theatre Conference (World Premiere: February 2017 at Illusion Theater, Minneapolis; Second Production at Indiana Repertory Theatre, April 2017)
- Before We Forgot How to Dream: April 4, 1968 - Workshop at Indiana Repertory Theatre, Dec2013. Commissioned by Indiana Repertory Theatre (World Premiere: October 2015 at Indiana Repertory Theatre)
- Appoggiatura -Workshop at Colorado New Play Summit 2014 and Perry-Mansfield New Works Festival 2013. Preview Production March 2013 Launch Pad, UC-Santa Barbara. Commissioned by Denver Center Theatre (World Premiere: February 2015 at Denver Center Theatre Company). Nominated for Outstanding New Play/Musical - Henry Awards, Colorado Theatre Guild (2015)
- The Widow Lincoln - Workshop at Ford's Theatre, Washington, D.C., Nov2013. Commissioned by Ford's Theatre (World Premiere: February 2015 at Ford's Theatre)
- When Miss Lydia Hinkley Gives a Bird the Bird - Finalist for the Heideman Award with Actors Theatre of Louisville. New Harmony Project 2014. Red Bull Theatre's Short New Play Festival 2014. StayAwake! Theatre Company/Denver Prism Festival 2014. Prologue Theatre /Landmark Festival, Chicago 2015. Briefs/That Uppity Theatre Company, St. Louis 2016.
- The House That Jack Built - Premiered November 2012 at Indiana Repertory Theatre in Indianapolis. 2012 Winner of 2012 Todd McNerney New Play Prize / Spoleto
- Illegal Use of Hands - Premiered 2012 at American Blues Theater in Chicago
- I Love to Eat - One man show about culinary icon James Beard - Premiered 2011 at Indiana Repertory Theatre in Indianapolis. 2012: Round House Theatre in Washington, DC. 2013: Portland Center Stage in Portland, OR.
- The Heavens Are Hung In Black - Commissioned and Premiered at Ford's Theatre in Washington, D.C. 2012: Abraham Lincoln Presidential Museum in Springfield, IL.
- A Long Bridge Over Deep Waters - Commissioned and Premiered by Cornerstone Theater Company in Los Angeles
- Interpreting William - Premiered at the Indiana Repertory Theatre in Indianapolis
- The Velvet Rut - Premiered at the Unicorn in Kansas City, M.O. and Illusion Theatre in Minneapolis
- Iron Kisses - Premiered at Geva Theatre Center in Rochester, N.Y.
- Looking Over The President's Shoulder - Premiered at the Indiana Repertory Theatre in Indianapolis
- He Held Me Grand - Premiered at People's Light and Theatre Company in Malvern, PA and at the Indiana Repertory Theatre in Indianapolis
- Amber Waves - (one-act version) Premiered at the John F. Kennedy Center for the Performing Arts, (full length) Premiered at the Indiana Repertory Theatre
- Searching For Eden - Premiered at the American Heartland Theater in Kansas City, MO
- The Gentleman From Indiana (adapted from the novel by Booth Tarkington), Premiered at the Indiana Repertory Theatre
- A Village Fable - (adapted from the novella In the Suicide Mountains by John Gardner), Music by Michael Keck; one act version premiered at the Honolulu Theatre for Youth, full length premiered at the Children's Theatre Company in Minneapolis
- And Then They Came for Me: Remembering the World of Anne Frank - Premiered at the Indiana Repertory Theatre and George Street Playhouse in New Brunswick, NJ
- Hush: An Interview With America - Premiered at Childsplay in Tempe, AZ and at Metro Theatre Company in St. Louis
- The Velveteen Rabbit - (play) premiered at the Omaha Theatre for Young People
- The Velveteen Rabbit - Music by Jimmy Roberts, Premiered at Theatreworks USA, New York City
- Dreaming on Tiptoe - Premiered at East Coast Arts in New Rochelle, NY
- Reunion (Love in Three Parts) - Premiered September 2023 at the Pittsburgh New Works Festival produced by the Heritage Players
