= Craig Bohmler =

American composer

Craig Bohmler (born April 7, 1956) is an American composer who specializes in opera and musical theater. His musicals include Gunmetal Blues (1991), which has had well over 100 professional productions; Enter the Guardsman (1997), which won the international Musical of the Year award and received an Olivier Award nomination; and Mountain Days (2000), celebrating the life of John Muir. His operas include Riders of the Purple Sage (2017), an adaptation of Zane Grey's book of the same title. In February - March 2017, the Arizona Opera presented the world premiere of Bohmler's Riders of the Purple Sage which was broadcast nationwide in November 2017 and internationally in 2018.

Bohmler has also composed numerous song cycles and other works for solo voice, choral works, and instrumental music pieces, and he is also a musical-theater director, vocal coach, and pianist.

== Early life and education ==
Bohmler was born in Houston in 1956. He started piano lessons at the age of six, and began composing music as a teenager. He graduated from Dickinson High School in Dickinson, Texas in 1974.

He attended the University of North Texas's College of Music, graduating in 1978 with a Bachelor of Music degree. In 1980 he received a Master of Music degree in piano performance from the University of Houston, where he studied piano and composition with Carlisle Floyd, who became his composition mentor.

== Career ==
=== 1981 to 1999 ===
From 1981 through 1984, Bohmler was both a pianist and, beginning as an apprentice, vocal coach at the Houston Opera Studio of the Houston Grand Opera. Afterwards, he was invited to the Banff Center for the Arts in Canada as a composer-in-residence, and then became musical director for the winter program there for the following three years. His first opera, The Harlot and the Monk, was staged at Banff in February 1985; it is a one-act comic opera with a libretto by James Howley, based on an 8th-century Indian play.

In his last term at Banff he met musical-theater actress and lyricist Marion Adler, and turned his sights to musical theater composition, collaborating with her on his first musical, Gunmetal Blues, a spoof of 1940s private-eye flicks with a book by Scott Wentworth. Via a phone call by Carlisle Floyd, the musical was workshopped in 1989 at the Eugene O'Neill Theater Center in Connecticut. It premiered at the Phoenix Little Theatre in 1991 and subsequently had over 100 professional productions in the U.S., Canada, Europe, and Japan, including an Off-Broadway production by the Amas Musical Theatre at Theater Off Park in April–May 1992, and a 2014 production at Queen's Theatre, Hornchurch in London.

Houston Grand Opera's Houston Opera Studio commissioned Bohmler's second opera, an "outreach" opera for youthful singers. The result was The Achilles Heel, a one-act opera with a libretto by Mary Carol Warwick, in which three high-school students – a blind boy, a black boy, and a beautiful girl – learn lessons about tolerance and perceived limitations. The score combines elements of classical, musical-theater, jazz, and rap music. The work was premiered by Houston Opera Studio in February 1993 at the Heinen Theater of the Houston Community College. It won first prize in the National Opera Association's biennial Chamber Opera Competition in 1995.

Bohmler's next production was a musical, Enter the Guardsman, another collaboration with lyricist Marion Adler and book writer Scott Wentworth. It is based on Ferenc Molnár's 1910 Hungarian farce The Guardsman, about a man who disguises himself as a dashing guardsman to seduce his own wife, an English-language production of which Carlisle Floyd had had a supporting role in Florida in 1949. Prior to being fully produced, Enter the Guardsman won the first-ever international Musical of the Year competition in Aarhus, Denmark in 1996. It then premiered in 1997 at the West End's Donmar Warehouse in London, in a sponsorship between the Donmar and the Really Useful Group, and in 1998 was nominated for the Olivier Award for Best New Musical. Subsequent productions included a limited engagement Off-Broadway at the Vineyard/Dimson Theater, May–June 2000.

Opera San Jose commissioned Bohmler's next opera, The Tale of the Nutcracker, an operatic re-working of E. T. A. Hoffmann's "The Nutcracker and the Mouse King", with a libretto by Daniel Helfgot. The company premiered it in November–December 1999 at the Montgomery Theater in San Jose.

=== 2000 to present ===
Bohmler's musical Mountain Days, about the life of naturalist John Muir, was commissioned by the Concord Pavilion and Willows Theatre in Concord, California, with book and lyrics by Mary Bracken Phillips. It premiered in October 2000 at the outdoor 15,000-seat Concord Pavilion, with a cast of 80 performers, 28 symphony musicians, and a 50-person chorus. A cast recording was also produced. Afterwards, the Willows Theatre Company constructed an outdoor waterfront amphitheater in Muir's adult hometown Martinez, California to house the musical as an annual event.

For Shakespeare Santa Cruz's annual Winter Holiday season, Bohmler composed the music for playwright and lyricist Kate Hawley's Gretel and Hansel, a musical comedy written in the style of a British pantomime. The music for the lively piece features styles ranging from ragtime to hip-hop, musical-theatre, and Kurt Weill. It premiered in November–December 2001, at the University of California, Santa Cruz.

The Quiltmaker's Gift is a family holiday musical commissioned by the Phoenix Theatre in Arizona, based on the children's book of the same title by Jeff Brumbeau, which tells the story of a greedy king and a quiltmaker who teaches him the joy of generosity. Bohmler composed the music, lyrics are by Steven Mark Kohn, and the adapted stage book is by Alan J. Prewitt. The Phoenix Theatre premiered the piece in November 2002. Bohmler and Kohn wrote another children's musical for Phoenix Theatre, Unstoppable Me!, based on a 2006 book of the same title by Wayne Dyer, adapted for the stage by Michael Barnard and Vincent VanVleet; the piece premiered in 2011.

For American Musical Theatre of San Jose, Bohmler re-teamed with lyricist Marion Adler for How to Create a Musical, with a book by Marc Jacobs. The full-length musical is a high-school-based farce which satirically shows the audience how musicals can transform everyday events into magical moments. It was presented at various Santa Clara County schools and libraries in early 2005.

The San Jose Repertory Theatre commissioned a locally based musical from Bohmler and Mary Bracken Phillips for its 25th anniversary season. This resulted in The Haunting of Winchester, about rifle heiress Sarah Winchester and her Winchester Mystery House in San Jose. The musical premiered in September–October 2005.

Willows Theatre Company in northern California commissioned another musical from Bohmler and Mary Bracken Phillips to perform at the theater company's annual John Muir festival it had initiated with Mountain Days. The result was Sacagawea, the story of the Shoshone Indian guide Sacagawea, who was instrumental on the Lewis and Clark Expedition. It was premiered by Willows Theatre at the Alhambra Performing Arts Center in Martinez, California in the summer of 2008.

Bohmler re-teamed with Marion Adler (lyrics) and Marc Jacobs (book) for All the More to Love, commissioned by the Laguna Playhouse. The musical concerns the eponymous former real-life consignment store for plus-size women's clothing in Alameda, California and its patrons – plus-sized women and some cross-dressing men. It premiered at the Phoenix Theatre in Arizona in April 2010.

After an accidental visit to the Zane Grey Cabin and Museum in Payson, Arizona in 2010, Bohmler read Zane Grey's novel Riders of the Purple Sage, and conceived the idea of adapting it into an opera. He convinced his musical lyricist Steven Mark Kohn to write the libretto, and garnered a close collaboration with, and a commission from, Arizona Opera. Riders of the Purple Sage had its world premiere by Arizona Opera, in February 2017 in Tucson and March 2017 in Phoenix. It was also broadcast nationwide on November 25, 2017 on the WFMT Radio Network's American Opera Series, and broadcast internationally in 2018 via distribution to the European Broadcasting Union.

== Awards ==
- First Prize, National Opera Association's Chamber Opera Competition (1995, for The Achilles Heel)
- Musical of the Year, International Musical Contest, Aarhus, Denmark (1996, for Enter the Guardsman)
- Nomination, Olivier Award for Best New Musical (1998, for Enter the Guardsman)
- Arizona Governor's Arts Awards – Artist Award (2019)

== Personal life ==
Bohmler has been based in the Phoenix, Arizona area since 1988. In 2015 he married actor/singer/director Rusty Ferracane, whom he has been with since 1995.

== Stage works ==
=== Operas ===
- The Harlot and the Monk (1985)
- The Achilles Heel (1993)
- The Tale of the Nutcracker (1999)
- Riders of the Purple Sage (2017)

=== Musicals ===
- Gunmetal Blues (1991)
- Enter the Guardsman (1997)
- Mountain Days (2000)
- Gretel and Hansel (2001)
- The Quiltmaker's Gift (2002)
- How to Make a Musical (2005)
- The Haunting of Winchester (2005)
- Sacagawea (2008)
- All the More to Love (2010)
- Unstoppable Me! (2011)
