= Enter the Guardsman =

Enter the Guardsman is a musical based on Ferenc Molnár's play The Guardsman, with music by Craig Bohmler, lyrics by Marion Adler, and a book by Scott Wentworth.

The story concerns an actor who tests his actress wife's love by sending her roses as a secret admirer and disguising himself as a guardsman to seduce her.

Enter the Guardsman won the first Musical of the Year competition in Aarhus, Denmark in 1996. The musical was then presented in 1997 at London's Donmar Warehouse, under a sponsorship between Donmar and the Useful Group. It was nominated for the Olivier Award for Best New Musical in 1998. In 1999, Enter the Guardsman premiered in the U.S. at the New Jersey Shakespeare Festival. A limited engagement of fifteen performances subsequently took place at the Dimson Theater in New York City in 2000.
