= Kavi Raz =

Indian-born British actor, writer, director and producer

- Born: 13 August 1953 (age 73); Punjab, India
- Occupations: Actor, film director

Kavi Raz (born 13 August 1953) is an Indian-born British actor, writer, director and producer. Born in Punjab, Raz left India at a young age for the United Kingdom, where he grew up.

Raz is best known for his role as Dr. VJ Kochar on the 1980's medical drama St. Elsewhere, for which he is often credited as the first actor of South Asian descent to play a regular role in an American network television series.

== Biography ==
Raz was one of several children born to a Sikh family in a small village in Punjab. His father had served in the British Indian Army during World War II, allowing him to receive a work visa for the United Kingdom. The family relocated to the United Kingdom when Raz was 11, residing in Leamington Spa; they later relocated again to the United States, joining Raz's older sister in California. He attended university in the San Francisco Bay Area, earning a bachelor's degree in engineering and a master's degree in industrial engineering.

He was a founder and artistic director of the Wandering Players' Theatre Company. The company staged several World and US premieres of plays from India. Western audiences were exposed to the works of Rabindranath Tagore for the first time, in addition to plays like Sakharam Binder and Shakuntala. This was the first professional South Asian theatre company in the USA.

In the mid-1970s, Raz arrived in Hollywood: a career as an actor was unheard of at a time when roles for South Asian actors in Hollywood television shows and films were limited. According to Raz, “People, especially friends and relatives scoffed at the idea of my becoming an actor. They thought it was a passing fancy and would soon be over. But no, I had a dream and take what it may I journeyed on to make my dream a reality.”

He went on to become the first ever South Asian actor to be signed on as a regular in a major TV series, St. Elsewhere. He was a cast member for the first two seasons of the medical drama in the role of Dr. VJ Kochar, an anesthesiologist, and after being let go continued to appear on a recurring basis. Raz has also appeared in over 200 plays, TV shows and films, including guest appearances on The A-Team, Our House, M*A*S*H and Star Trek: The Next Generation. He was a finalist for the role of Lt. Commander Data in the latter program before Brent Spiner was ultimately cast. He co-starred with Joe Odagiri and Chloe Snyder in Atsushi Funahashi's Big River in 2005.

In addition to acting, Raz has had a career as a filmmaker, which began with The Gold Bracelet, a movie about a Sikh man faced with the realities of post-9/11. In 1978, Raz founded the production company K. R. Films Hollywood. Its debut, Lehren - a television weekly variety series for the Asian audience - was shown throughout the United States and Canada. In 1988, K. R. Studios was built in Granada Hills. Housing several buildings including the main studio, it has state-of-the-art equipment for film and television productions, as well as a multi-track recording facility for post production and recording needs. The studio is now home to many award-winning producers, writers and directors engaged in the production of commercials, TV programs, music videos and films.

== Filmography ==
=== Films ===
- Suraag (1982) – Hindi film
- Warning Sign (1985)
- Terror Squad (1988)
- Pet Sematary (1989)
- Big River (2005)
- The Gold Bracelet (2006)
- The Black Prince (2017)
- Sarabha (2024)

=== Television ===
- St. Elsewhere (1982–1987)
- M*A*S*H (1983)
- The A-Team (1985)
- Our House (1986)
- Star Trek: The Next Generation (1987)
- House, M.D. (2010)
