= Scott Wentworth =

American actor and director (born 1955)

- Born: 1955 (age 70–71); Baltimore, Maryland, U.S.
- Occupations: Actor, director
- Years active: 1988–present
- Spouse: Marion Adler

Scott Wentworth (born 1955) is an American actor and director who immigrated to Canada in 1986.

== Early life ==
Wentworth was born in Baltimore, Maryland, in 1955.

== Career ==
After starting his career in New York City, he began a long association with the Stratford Shakespeare Festival in the 1985 production of The Glass Menagerie. He would later perform in a wide variety of roles at Stratford, such as Cliff in Cabaret, the title role in Macbeth, Sky Masterson in Guys and Dolls, Shylock in Merchant of Venice and Tevye in Fiddler on the Roof. He also directed Henry IV, Part 1 and Henry IV, Part 2 in 2001 and The Adventures of Pericles in 2015.

He returned to New York in 1989 to appear in Welcome to the Club, and received a Tony nomination (Best Performance by a Featured Actor in a Musical). As a director, he has worked at the Indiana Repertory Theatre, the Citadel Theatre in Edmonton, and the Hillberry Theatre in Detroit.

Wentworth has co-written musicals with his wife Marion Adler and composer, Craig Bohmler. Their first collaboration, Gunmetal Blues, has been performed at the George Street Playhouse in New Brunswick, New Jersey, and the Colony Theatre in Burbank, California. Their second collaboration, Enter the Guardsman, based on the Ferenc Molnár play The Guardsman, was nominated for a Laurence Olivier Award (Best Musical) in 1997.

== Filmography ==
=== Film ===
Year	Title	Role	Notes
1989	Sing	Freddy	
1997	The Ice Storm	Paul's Teacher	
1999	Free Fall	Scott Wallace	
2007	Diary of the Dead	Andrew Maxwell	
2015	King Lear	Gloucester	
2017	Stratford Festival: Macbeth	Banquo	

=== Television ===
Year	Title	Role	Notes
1989	Texas	Recruit #3	2 episodes
1988	The Taming of the Shrew	Tranio	Television film
1989	Saturday Night with Connie Chung	Terry Anderson	Episode: "Terry Anderson"
1993	American Experience	Jack Greenberg	Episode: "Simple Justice"
1994	Janek: The Silent Betrayal	Stefano	Television film
1994–1996	Kung Fu: The Legend Continues	Det. Kermit Griffin	25 episodes
1996	Blazing Dragons	Sir Loungelot	13 episodes
2002	Law & Order	Senator Elliot Judson	Episode: "Missing"
2004	Elizabeth Rex	Jack Edmund	Television film
2008	The Trojan Horse	CIA Director	Episode: "Part One"
2009	U.S. Attorney	Judge F. Garafola	Television film
2009–2010	The Border	Minister Jack Hardacre	3 episodes
2010–2011	Baxter	Mr. Kingfield	9 episodes
2011	XIII: The Series	Harrison	Episode: "The Train"
2011	She's the Mayor	Bill Clarke	13 episodes
2011, 2013	Murdoch Mysteries	Dr. Harwick	2 episodes
2014	Bomb Girls	Willard Galloway	Episode: "Facing the Enemy"
2016–2017	Orphan Black	Dr. Ian Van Lier	5 episodes
2017	Suits	Snitzer	Episode: "Character and Fitness"
2022	Home for a Royal Heart	Frank	Television film
