= Anne Kauffman =

American director

- Education: Stanford University (BA); University of California, San Diego (MFA)

Anne Kauffman is an American director known primarily for her work on new plays, mainly in the New York area. She is a founding member of the theater group the Civilians. She made her Broadway debut with the Scott McPherson play Marvin's Room (2017) and returned with the revival of the Lorraine Hansberry play The Sign in Sidney Brustein's Window (2023) and Mary Jane (2024).

== Early life and education ==
Kauffman received her undergraduate degree from Stanford University and her MFA from the graduate directing program at UCSD.

Kauffman has said: "I'm attracted to plays that need the theater and belong only to the theater,...I've always been very interested in writers who have a kind of mystery to them--something that makes me work a little hard and is compelling and mysterious...trying to get at the world from a slightly odd angle....I do love working with a playwright more than once."

== Career ==
=== 2006–2013: Regional and off-Broadway ===
Kauffman's past regional productions include Body Awareness by Annie Baker (2012) at the Wilma Theater; and Pulitzer Prize finalist Becky Shaw by Gina Gionfriddo (2009); The Flea and the Professor by Jordan Harrison at the Arden Theatre Company (2011); Six Degrees of Separation by John Guare at the Williamstown Theatre Festival (2010); We Have Always Lived in the Castle by Adam Bock and Todd Almond at Yale Rep (2010); The Communist Dracula Pageant by Anne Washburn at ART (2008); Expecting Isabel by Lisa Loomer and Doubt by John Patrick Shanley at Asolo Repertory Theatre (2007); Act A Lady by Jordan Harrison at the Humana Festival of New American Plays (2006); and Typographer's Dream and Shaker Chair by Adam Bock (2005).

Kauffman directed The Thugs by Adam Bock Off-Broadway at the Soho Rep in 2006. She received the 2007 Obie Award for direction for this production.

Kauffman directed Amy Herzog's Belleville Off-Broadway at the New York Theatre Workshop in 2013. The reviewer for Time magazine wrote: "She [Kauffman] serves the play wonderfully, with a light but firm hand, for a tense, almost breathtaking hour and a half." She also directed Belleville at the Steppenwolf Theatre, Chicago, in 2013. The reviewer of the Chicago production noted "Kauffmann's tense, adroit, nuanced, deftly cast production..." She directed Amy Herzog's Mary Jane Off-Broadway at the New York Theatre Workshop in Sept. 2017. Jesse Green, in his review for The New York Times, noted "Ms. Kauffman's ideally detailed direction."

Past Off-Broadway productions include Maple and Vine by Jordan Harrison (2011) and Pulitzer Prize finalist play Detroit by Lisa D'Amour (2012) at Playwrights Horizons;. Stunning by David Adjmi (2009) and Slowgirl by Greg Pierce (2012) at LCT3; You'd Better Sit Down: Tales From My Parents' Divorce (Written with The Civilians) at The Flea Theater (2012); This Wide Night by Chloe Moss by Naked Angels Theater Company (2010); Sixty Miles to Silver Lake by Dan Le Franc at Soho Rep (2009); Have You Seen Steve Steven by Ann Marie Healy with 13P (2007); God's Ear by Jenny Schwartz at The Vineyard and New Georges (2007); and The Ladies by Anne Washburn at the Cherry Lane Theater and Dixon Place (2004).

=== 2016–present: Broadway debut ===
In 2016, she directed Smokefall by Noah Haidle with Zachary Quinto at the Off-Broadway Lucille Lortel Theatre in an MCC production; she had previously directed the play at the South Coast Repertory, and the Goodman Theatre in 2013. She directed The Nether by Jennifer Haley in 2015 for MCC. She directed Marjorie Prime by Jordan Harrison at Playwrights Horizons in 2015. This was the second time that Kauffman and Harrison worked together. In 2014 she directed the Off-Broadway production of You Got Older by Clare Barron at HERE. She directed Sundown, Yellow Moon by Rachel Bonds, which premiered Off-Broadway at the WP Theater in a co-production by Ars Nova and WP in 2017. Ben Brantley, in his review for The New York Times, noted the "beautifully acted production...directed with probing sensitivity by Anne Kauffman."

In 2017, she made her Broadway debut directing Marvin's Room for Roundabout Theatre Company, Assassins at Encores! Off-Center, Mary Jane at New York Theatre Workshop, and Hundred Days at the Under the Radar Festival and New York Theatre Workshop. In 2018, she directed The Lucky Ones at the Connelly Theater for Ars Nova, and Hundred Days at La Jolla Playhouse, where she is about to direct Lindsey Ferrentino's The Year to Come.

She is a Sundance program associate, a usual suspect at New York Theatre Workshop, an alumna of The Drama League Directors Project and Soho Rep Writers and Directors Lab, a current member of Soho Rep's Artistic Council, Lincoln Center Directors Lab, a founding member of the Civilians, an associate artist with Clubbed Thumb and co-creator of the CT Directing Fellowship, and member of New Georges Kitchen Cabinet. From 2000 to 2006, Kauffman was on the directing faculty at NYU. Kauffman is an executive board member of the Stage Directors and Choreographers Society. Kauffman is the artistic director of New York City Center's Encores! Off-Center, and was the co-artistic director with Jeanine Tesori for the 2018 season. Encores! Off-Center has been on hiatus since 2020.

Kauffman directed the 2023 production of Lorraine Hansberry's The Sign in Sidney Brustein's Window starring Oscar Isaac and Rachel Brosnahan at the Brooklyn Academy of Music. She returned to Broadway directing its transfer at the James Earl Jones Theatre. She received a Drama League Award for her direction and the production received a Tony Award for Best Revival of a Play nomination.

== Theatre credits ==
Selected credits as director

Year	Play	Playwright	Theatre
2016	A Life	Hugh Leonard	Peter Jay Sharp Theatre, Off-Broadway
2017	Marvin's Room	Scott McPherson	American Airlines Theatre, Broadway
2017	Mary Jane	Amy Herzog	New York Theatre Workshop, Off-Broadway
2022	The Bedwetter	Sarah Silverman	Linda Gross Theatre, Off-Broadway
2023	The Sign in Sidney Brustein's Window	Lorraine Hansberry	Brooklyn Academy of Music, Off-Broadway
2023	The Sign in Sidney Brustein's Window	Lorraine Hansberry	James Earl Jones Theatre, Broadway
2024	Mary Jane	Amy Herzog	Samuel J. Friedman Theatre, Broadway
2025	Marjorie Prime	Jordan Harrison	Helen Hayes Theater, Broadway
2026	You Got Older	Clare Barron	Cherry Lane Theater, Off-Broadway
2027	Too Bad For Her	Clare Barron	Atlantic Theater Company, Off-Broadway

== Awards and honors ==
She has received the Lilly Award for directing in 2010, the Alan Schneider Director Award, the Joan and Joseph Cullman award for Exceptional Creativity from Lincoln Center, 2004 Big Easy Award, and Ambie Award (for The Children's Hour) in New Orleans. She has received Philadelphia's Barrymore Award for Best Direction in 2010 for Becky Shaw, and in 2012 for Body Awareness. Detroit by Lisa D'Amour was listed in the top 10 productions of 2012 by The New York Times, New York Magazine, Time and TimeOut NY.

Year	Associations	Category	Project	Result	Ref.
2007	Obie Award	Outstanding Direction of a Play	The Thugs	Won	
2011	Lucille Lortel Award	Outstanding Director	This Wide Night	Nominated	
2013	Lucille Lortel Award	Outstanding Director	Belleville	Nominated	
2015	Drama Desk Award	Outstanding Direction of a Play	You Got Older	Nominated	
2015	Obie Award	Sustained Achievement Award		Received	
2016	Lucille Lortel Award	Outstanding Director	Marjorie Prime	Nominated	
2016	Lucille Lortel Award	Outstanding Director	A Life	Nominated	
2018	Lucille Lortel Award	Outstanding Direction of a Play	Mary Jane	Won	
2018	Obie Award	Outstanding Direction of a Play	Mary Jane	Won	
2023	Drama League Award	Outstanding Direction of a Play	The Sign in Sidney Brustein's Window	Won	
2024	Tony Award	Best Direction of a Play	Mary Jane	Nominated	
