= Laurie Woolery =

American dramatist

- Education: University of California, Los Angeles
- Occupations: playwright, director, educator
- Organization(s): Public Works at The Public Theater, The Sol Project
- Website: lauriewoolery.com

Laurie Woolery is a Latino playwright, director, and educator based in New York City. She is the director of Public Works at The Public Theater and founding member of The Sol Project. In 2014 she was awarded a Fuller Road Artist Residency for Women Directors of Color. She is best known for her 2017 musical adaptation of As You Like It.

== Education ==
Woolery graduated from the University of California, Los Angeles with a BA in English and holds a Spanish Language Certificate from the Universidad de Iteso, Guadalajara, Mexico.

== Career ==
Woolery has served as Director of Public Works at The Public Theater since 2014. Public Works is a participatory theatre program that engages New Yorkers in the creation of theatre. Community members from all the boroughs of New York City attend workshops, classes, and performances that culminates each summer in participatory theatre productions. Within Public Works, Woolery initiated the program "ACTivate" (Artist, Citizen, Theater maker) that partners community members with professional playwrights to develop their own plays. Woolery adapted and directed the musical adaptation of As You Like It for Public Works’ first show of the 2017–2018 season.

In May 2016, Woolery was a founding member of The Sol Project in New York City. The Sol Project works with theatre companies to promote the visibility and work of Latino playwrights and producing plays by new Latino playwrights. Woolery collaborated with The Sol Project to produce El Huracán at the Yale Repertory Theatre in 2018.

Currently, she serves on the boards of the Latino Producers Action Network and the Latinx Theatre Commons.

Woolery is the former Associate Artistic Director of Cornerstone Theater Company, the former artist-in-residence at Hollygrove Children's Home in Los Angeles, the former Conservatory Director at South Coast Repertory, and a former board member for the Network of Ensemble Theatres and the Children's Theater Foundation. She has also worked at Los Angeles Philharmonic, REDCAT, Mark Taper Forum, Goodman Theatre, Los Angeles Theatre Center, Denver Center Theatre Company, William Inge Theater Festival, 24th Street Theatre, Cerritos Center for the Performing Arts, Virginia Avenue Project, Ricardo Montalbán Theatre, Deaf-West Theatre, fofo Theatre, Oregon Shakespeare Festival, Highways Performance Space, A Noise Within, the Sundance Children's Theatre, and Sundance Playwrights Lab.

Woolery is a lecturer in theatre at Princeton University and previously taught at New York University, Brown University, Columbia University, Citrus College, Glendale College, University of Southern California, California Institute for the Arts, California State University at Los Angeles, and California State University at Northridge.

== Playwriting ==
- Salvadorian Moon/African Sky debuted at Cornerstone Theater Company (2001).
- Orphan Train: The Lost Children debuted at South Coast Repertory (2003).
- The Hundred Dresses debuted at South Coast Repertory (2011).
- Lola in Lincolnlandia debuted at REDCAT (2012).
- Ladybird debuted at 24th Street Theatre (2013).
- Bliss debuted at South Coast Repertory (2014).
- Musical adaptation of As You Like It debuted at The Public Theater (2017).

== Directing ==
- Living Out by Lisa Loomer. Mark Taper Forum (2003).
- Lovers and Executioners by John Strand. South Coast Repertory (2004).
- Amor Eterno – Six Lessons in Love by six Latinx playwrights. Ricardo Montalbán Theatre (2004).
- The Day I Flipped Off Jimmy Carter by Richard Coca. South Coast Repertory for the Hispanic Playwrights Project (2004).
- Reflecting Back by Bryan Davidson. Los Angeles Central Library for the National Tour of the American Originals exhibit (2005).
- 3/7/11: A Lincoln Heights Tale by Jose Cruz Gonzalez and the students of Loreto Elementary, Nightingale Middle School and Lincoln High School. Cornerstone Theater Company (2006).
- For All Time by KJ Sanchez. Cornerstone Theater Company (2008).
- Jason in Eureka by Peter Howard. Cornerstone Theater Company (2009).
- A Holtville Night's Dream by Alison Carey. Cornerstone Theater Company (2009).
- A Man Comes To Fowler by Julie Marie Myatt. Cornerstone Theater Company (2011).
- The Language Archive by Julia Cho. Oregon Shakespeare Festival (2011)
- The Tenth Muse by Tanya Saracho. Oregon Shakespeare Festival (2013).
- Charlotte's Web by E.B. White. South Coast Repertory (2015).
- Troy by Andrea Thome & ACTivate Ensemble. Public Works at The Public Theater (2016).
- The River Bride by Marisela Trevino Orta. Oregon Shakespeare Festival (2016).
- Imogen Says Nothing by Aditi Brennan Kapil. Yale Repertory Theatre (2017).
- Manahatta by Mary Kathryn Nagle. Oregon Shakespeare Festival (2018).
- El Huracán by Charise Castro Smith. Yale Repertory Theatre (2018).

== Film and television ==
- As Good as Dead (1995)
- Breaking Through (1996)
- Once and Again (1999-2002)
- Dante's Inferno (2008)

== Major productions ==
=== As You Like It (2017) ===
In collaboration with Shaina Taub, Woolery's musical adaptation of As You Like It premiered on September 1, 2017 at the Delacorte Theater in New York City. As part of Public Works at The Public Theater’s mission of community engagement, the musical featured over 200 actors and community members. All performances were free and open to the public. Adapted from William Shakespeare's classic story, As You Like It explores themes of friendship, family, and love. Orlando, Duke Senior, his daughter Rosalind and niece Celia are exiled from their homes and flee to the magical and welcoming Forest of Arden where the characters find community, kindness and self-discovery. The production reflects New York City with a score of pop, R&B, and folk music and diversity of cast members. Along with professional actors, the cast includes community volunteer performers from the Casita Maria Center For Arts and Education, the Brooklyn's Brownsville Recreation Center and Center For Family Life in Sunset Park, Domestic Workers United, Children's Aid Society, Queen's Fortune Society, the Military Resilience Project, the Bronx's DreamYard Project, the Harambee Dance Company, the Bronx Wrestling Federation, the Sing Harlem Choir, and the Freedom Dabka Group. The production celebrates people of color and the LGBT community with a multi-cultural cast and emphasis on the queer love story where Phoebe's Silvius becomes Sylvia and Touchstone's Audrey becomes Andy. The New York Times named the production one of the best shows of 2017.

=== El Huracán (2018) ===
In collaboration with The Sol Project, El Huracán premiered on September 28, 2018 at the Yale Repertory Theatre. Written by Charise Castro Smith, directed by Woolery, and starring Jennifer Paredes and Maria-Christina Oliveras, El Huracán is a bilingual, diasporic family drama focused on themes of memory, migration, forgiveness, and magic. Loosely based on The Tempest, El Huracán takes place across multiple time periods and locations. As a severe hurricane threatens Miami, a mother, daughter, and grandmother prepare for the impending storm. In the play, hurricanes literally and figuratively affect four generations of Cuban and Cuban-American women: Valeria, the strong matriarch afflicted by Alzheimers, her daughter Ximena who acts as Valeria's caregiver, her granddaughter Miranda who left Miami for Harvard University, and Miranda's daughter Val whose story is told 27 years in the future. El Huracán uses the metaphor of the hurricane to explore natural disaster, trauma and the loss of memory through Alzheimer's.
