= Jennifer Paredes =

American actress (born 1991)

- Born: January 13, 1991 (age 35); San Diego, California, U.S.
- Education: Otay Ranch High School; University of San Diego
- Occupations: Actress; musician
- Years active: 2008–present
- Known for: Theatrical performances throughout the United States
- Notable credits: Hero in Much Ado About Nothing; Viola in Twelfth Night; Lydia
- Awards: Craig Noel Award for Actor of the Year, Female
- Website: jenniferparedesactor.com

Jennifer Paredes (born January 13, 1991) is an American actress who appeared as Hero in Denver Center for the Performing Arts' production of Much Ado About Nothing, Helena in Stages Repertory Theatre's The River Bride, and Matilde in Portland Stage's The Clean House. Paredes won a Craig Noel Award for Actor of the Year for her performances in Diversionary Theatre's production of Ballast and as Viola in Old Globe's tour of Twelfth Night.

== Early life ==
Paredes grew up in Chula Vista, California after her parents immigrated from Peru and Tijuana. She became interested in acting during her senior year before graduating from Otay Ranch High School in 2008.

== Career ==
=== Theater performance ===
Early in her career, Paredes performed in The House Theatre of Chicago's West Coast premiere of The Nutcracker with Edred Utomi and in Manifest Destinitis, a Herbert Sigüenza adaptation of The Imaginary Invalid. In 2016, she was nominated for two Craig Noel Awards for her performances in Lydia and Seven Spots on the Sun. After studying acting at University of San Diego, Paredes made her Old Globe Theatre debut in 2017, portraying Viola in Twelfth Night and winning a Craig Noel Award for Actor of the Year, Female. The following year she performed in American Mariachi with Doreen Montalvo and in El Huracán by Charise Castro Smith at Yale Repertory Theatre under the direction of Laurie Woolery and co-starring Maria-Christina Oliveras.

=== Music and film ===
Paredes contributed music to the film Weigh Down. She did the same in theater for American Mariachi and played a ukulele in Logan Heights. In 2016, she appeared in the film South of 8 by Tony Olmos.

== Stage credits ==
Year	Title	Role	Location	Notes
2013	Logan Heights	Dalia Rosales	OnStage Playhouse, Chula Vista, California	
2014	The Nutcracker	Phoebe	New Village Arts Theatre, Carlsbad, California	Featuring Edred Utomi and Brian Patrick Butler
2016	Rapture, Blister, Burn	Avery Willard	San Diego Repertory Theatre, San Diego, California	
2016	Manifest Destinitis	Angelica / Luisa	San Diego Repertory Theatre, San Diego, California	Herbert Sigüenza adaptation of The Imaginary Invalid
2016	Lydia	Ceci	Ion Theatre, San Diego, California	
2016	September and Her Sisters	September	Scripps Ranch Theatre, San Diego, California	Part of "Out on a Limb", written by Jennifer Lane
2016	Seven Spots on the Sun	Monica	InnerMission Productions, San Diego, California	
2017	Waking la Llorona	Doctor E.S. Moctezuma	The Old Globe Theatre and La Jolla Playhouse, San Diego, California	Without Walls Festival
2017	Perfect Arrangement	Norma	Intrepid Theatre, San Diego, California	
2017	Into the Beautiful North	Vampi	San Diego Repertory Theatre	
2017	Ballast	Savannah	Diversionary Theatre, San Diego, California	
2017	Twelfth Night	Viola	Old Globe's tour in San Diego, California	
2018	American Mariachi	Lucha	Stage Theatre at Denver Center for the Performing Arts, Denver, Colorado	Featuring Doreen Montalvo
2018	American Mariachi	Lucha	The Old Globe Theatre	
2018	El Huracán	Alicia / Dr. Kempler / Val	Yale Repertory Theatre, New Haven, Connecticut	Written by Charise Castro Smith, directed by Laurie Woolery, featuring Maria-Christina Oliveras
2018	Froggy		La Jolla Playhouse, La Jolla, California	Staged reading
2019	Native Gardens	Tania Del Valle	Florida Repertory Theatre, Fort Myers, Florida	
2019	Loving and Loving	Maya	Florida Repertory Theatre, Fort Myers, Florida	
2019	The River Bride	Helena	Yeager Theater at Stages Repertory Theatre, Houston, Texas	
2019	The Clean House	Matilde	Portland Stage, Portland, Maine	
2019	The Straights	Phoebe	JACK, Brooklyn, New York	
2020	Hurricane Diane	Beth Wann	The Sheryl and Harvey White Theatre, San Diego, California	
2022	Much Ado About Nothing	Hero	Denver Center for the Performing Arts	

== Filmography ==
Year	Title	Role	Ref.
2012	Inch	Alisa	
2013	The Violation	Lia	
2014	A Very Grimm Christmas	Daisy	
2015	Yesternow	Mom	
2015	Too Young	Blair	
2016	A Life Lived	Personal Assistant	
2016	South of 8	Emma	
2017	The Playground	Auto Mechanic Clerk	
2017	Weigh Down	Jenna Young	
2017	Her Face	Annette	
2017	INvisible		
2020	Wander	Waitress	

Accolades
List of awards and nominations
Event	Year	Award	Title	Result	Ref.
The San Diego Theatre Critics Circle	2017	Craig Noel Award for Actor of the Year, Female	Twelfth Night, Ballast	Won	
The San Diego Theatre Critics Circle	2016	Craig Noel Award for Outstanding Lead Performance in a Play, Female	Lydia	Nominated	
The San Diego Theatre Critics Circle	2016	Craig Noel Award for Outstanding Featured Performance in a Play, Female	Seven Spots on the Sun	Nominated	
San Diego Film Awards	2014	Student Film Award: Best Supporting Actress	Inch	Won	
