= Gabriel Ebert =

American stage actor and singer

- Born: April 8, 1987 (age 39); Colorado, U.S.
- Education: Juilliard School (BFA)
- Occupation: Actor
- Years active: 2010–present
- Spouse: Danya Taymor

Gabriel Ebert is an American stage actor and singer. In 2013, he received a Tony Award for his featured role as Mr. Wormwood in Matilda the Musical.

== Early life ==
Ebert was born and raised in Colorado. He attended high school at the Denver School of the Arts and graduated from Juilliard.

== Career ==
Ebert made his Broadway debut as the understudy for the role of Ken in John Logan's play Red in 2010, followed by the Broadway production of Kneehigh Theatre's Brief Encounter in 2010 as Stanley.

Ebert is known for originating the role of Mr. Wormwood in the 2013 Broadway production of Matilda the Musical, for which he won the 2013 Tony Award for Best Featured Actor in a Musical. Ebert's performance in Amy Herzog's 4000 Miles at Lincoln Center Theater as the character "Leo", the grandson of Mary Louise Wilson's Vera, won him an Obie Award in 2012.

He starred as Robin Hood in The Heart of Robin Hood by David Farr in Winnipeg and Toronto in October 2014 to March 2015.

He played the role of Max in the 2015 movie Ricki and the Flash. In the 2015 production of the Helen Edmundson stage adaptation of Thérèse Raquin at the Roundabout Theater at Studio 54 he played Camille opposite Keira Knightley, Judith Light, and Matt Ryan.

In 2016, Ebert was cast in the pilot for the Amazon Video television program The Interestings.

In 2020, he played the role of a gunnery officer in The Mandalorian.

In 2025, he played Carter Smith in the Broadway premiere of John Proctor Is the Villain. He received a nomination for Tony Award for Best Featured Actor in a Play.

== Personal life ==
Ebert's special skills include juggling, ukulele, and reciting all 50 states in one breath. However, he has said that his whistling is very bad.

Ebert is married to director Danya Taymor

== Work ==
=== Film and television ===
Year	Title	Role	Notes
2011	The Restaurant	Stevie	Short
2012	Made in Jersey	Carter Gershan	Episode: "Ancient History"
2015	The Family Fang	Joseph	Film
2015	Ricki and the Flash	Max	Film
2015	Jane Wants a Boyfriend	Jack	Film
2016	The Blacklist	Theo	Episode: "Lady Ambrosia (No. 77)"
2016	The Interestings	Dennis	TV film
2017	The Immortal Life of Henrietta Lacks	Christoph Lengauer	TV film
2018	Instinct	Richard Brophy	Episode: "Tribal"
2019	The Good Fight	Lance McAlvoy	Episode: "The One Where a Nazi Gets Punched"
2019	Elementary	Sebastian Florenti	Episode: "The Price of Admission"
2019	Mr. Mercedes	Morris Bellamy	10 episodes
2020	The Mandalorian	Gunnery Officer	3 episodes
2020	News of the World	Benjamin Farley	Film
2021	Dickinson	Thomas Wentworth Higginson	7 episodes
2022	Let the Right One In	Nathaniel	Episode: "Stargazers"
2023	Hello Tomorrow!	Marvin Mayburn	Episode: "Great Salesmen Make Their Own Turf"
2025	Dope Thief	Jack	4 episodes

=== Theatre (selected) ===
Year	Title	Role	Notes
2010	Red	Ken	Understudy; John Golden Theatre
2010–2011	Brief Encounter	Stanley	Studio 54
2011	4000 Miles	Leo	Off-Broadway
2011	Prometheus Bound	Hephaistos/Hermes	American Repertory Theater
2013–2014	Matilda the Musical	Mr. Wormwood	Shubert Theatre
2014	The Heart of Robin Hood	Robin Hood	Winnipeg and Toronto, Canada
2014	Casa Valentina	Jonathon/Miranda	Samuel J. Friedman Theatre
2015	Preludes	Rach	Claire Tow Theater (Off-Broadway)
2015–2016	Thérèse Raquin	Camille Raquin	Adaptation by Helen Edmundson; Studio 54
2016	Peer Gynt	Peer Gynt	Classic Stage Company
2017	Gently Down the Stream	Rufus	
2017	Time and the Conways	Alan Conway	American Airlines Theatre
2018	Pass Over	Ossifer/Master	Lincoln Center Theater
2021	Pass Over	Ossifer/Master	August Wilson Theatre
2023	The Untitled Unauthorized Hunter S. Thompson Musical	Hunter	La Jolla Playhouse
2025	John Proctor Is the Villain	Carter Smith	Booth Theatre
