= Emily Donahoe =

American actress

- Education: Vassar College (BA); University of California, San Diego (MFA)
- Occupations: Actress, producer
- Spouse: Michael O'Keefe (after 2011)
- Children: 1

Emily Donahoe is an American actress, writer and producer.

== Education ==
Donahoe earned a Bachelor of Arts degree from Vassar College and a Master of Fine Arts from the University of California, San Diego

== Career ==
She won a Helen Hayes Award in 2004 in the category Outstanding Supporting Actress, Resident Play, for her performance in Shakespeare in Hollywood at the Arena Stage.

In 2016 she won an Obie Award for her performance in The Christians by Lucas Hnath. She appeared in The Christians as Jenny at the Off-Broadway Playwrights Horizons from August 28, 2015 to October 25, 2015.

Donahue appeared in the Amy Herzog play Mary Jane at the Yale Repertory Theatre in New Haven, Connecticut, April 28, 2017 to May 20, 2017. She received a Connecticut Critics Circle Award nomination for her performance as the title character.

She was a 2017 Beinecke Fellow at the Yale School of Drama.

She is the founder and principal of "WOMENSPEAK Training", a consultancy that specializes in training female speakers and in providing organizations and diversity partners with tools for "building female voice and visibility in the public arena" and "amplifying women's voices in order to drive both personal and organizational performance." She has been a featured speaker for the Women's Campaign School at Yale University.

== Personal life ==
She married Michael O'Keefe in 2011 and they have one child. She is a practitioner of Zen Buddhism.

== Filmography ==
=== Film ===
Year	Title	Role	Notes
2001	Zelimo	Susan	
2009	Handsome Harry	Kelley's Daughter	
2011	Dirty Movie	Sue	
2020	The Atlantic City Story	Beverly	
2023	Our Son	Alexandra	

=== Television ===
Year	Title	Role	Notes
2006	As the World Turns	Book Store Clerk	2 episodes
2013	Homeland	Susan Roberts	2 episodes
2014	Law & Order: Special Victims Unit	Lisa Barnes	Episode: "Pornstar's Requiem"
2015	High Maintenance	Arty Lesbian #2	Episode: "Esme"
2016	Bull	Sarah Mirror	Episode: "The Necklace"
2018	FBI	CIA Rep Anne Potter	3 episodes
2021–23	FBI: Most Wanted	Francesca Brighton	Episode: "Inherited"
2021	American Rust	Stephanie Katsufrakis	3 episodes
2023	Dead Ringers	Nicki	Episode: "One"
