= Maria-Christina Oliveras =

American actress

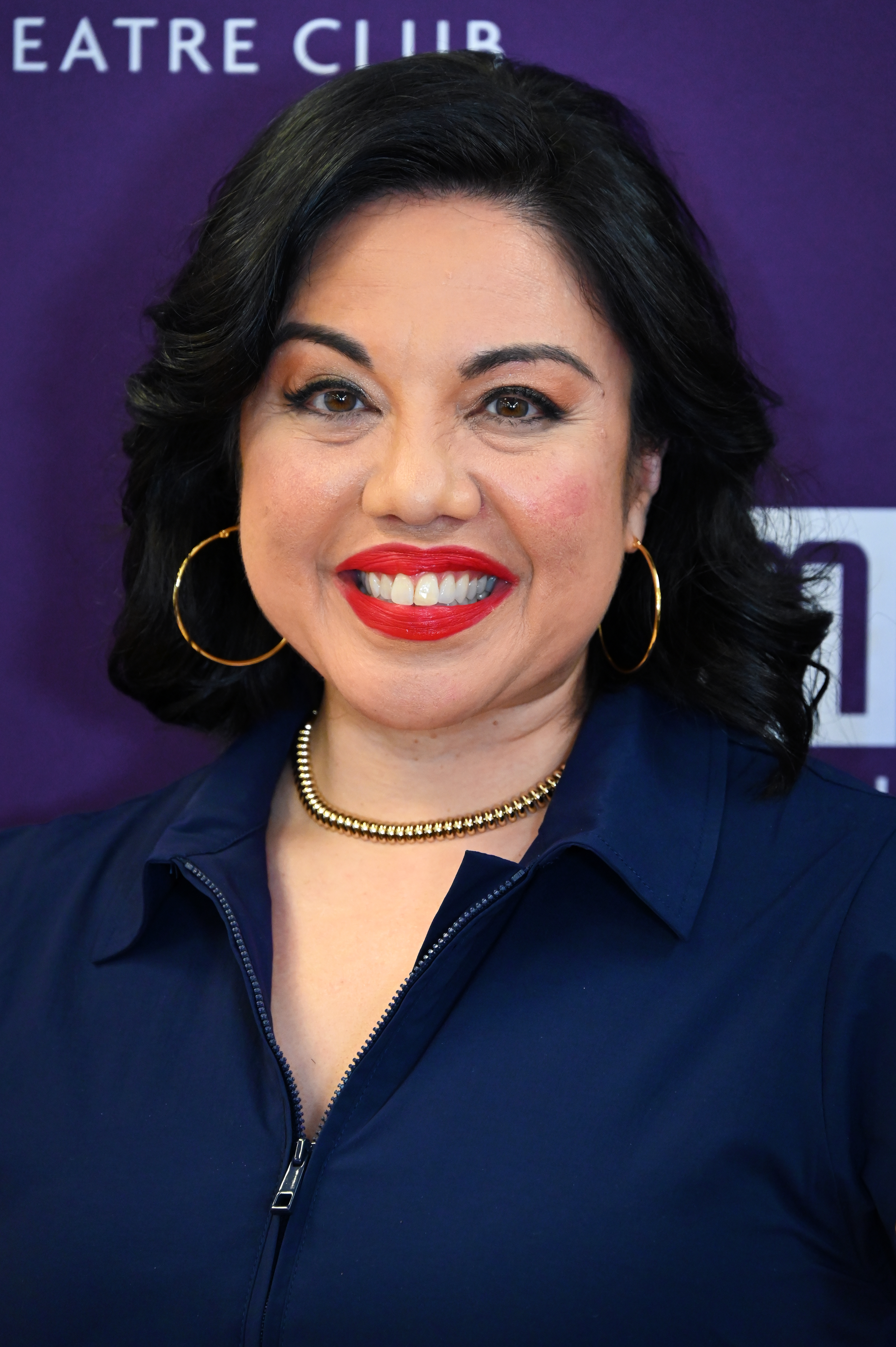
- Oliveras in 2026
- Born: New York City
- Education: Yale University (BA); National Theatre Conservatory (MFA)
- Occupations: Actress, singer, voice-over artist

Maria-Christina Oliveras is two-time Drama-Desk nominated film, television and Broadway actor and singer. She is of Filipino and Puerto Rican descent and known for her transformational character work and creating new roles in a number of world premieres including The Balusters, Here Lies Love, Amelie, Kiss My Aztec, Soft Power, among numerous others.

== Early life ==
Born in New York City, Oliveras is the daughter of Beatrice, a nurse, and Luis Tomas, a hospital food service administrator, she grew up in the Bronx. She studied at Yale University and received her BA with honors in Theater Studies. While there, she was an active participant in Yale Undergraduate Theater,and graduated with Jeremy Strong, Kyle Jarrow, and Alex Timbers.

In summer 2004, Oliveras was accepted into the Shakespeare Lab at The Public Theatre, where she studied with Ron Van Lieu, Kate Wilson and Michael Cumpsty, whom she later worked with on Broadway in Machinal. One of eight students selected, Oliveras went on to receive her MFA in acting from the National Theatre Conservatory in 2007.

== Career ==
Oliveras made her Broadway debut in 2010's Bloody Bloody Andrew Jackson, directed by Alex Timbers. She returned to Broadway in the Roundabout Theater’s 2014 revival of Machinal, playing multiple roles opposite Rebecca Hall. Oliveras' other Off-Broadway credits include the premieres of The Civilians' production of Pretty Filthy by Bess Wohl and Michael Friedman, directed by Steve Cosson; Here Lies Love at the Public Theater; Reading Under the Influence, starring Barbara Walsh, directed by Wendy Goldberg; Night Sky, starring Jordan Baker, directed by Daniella Topol; The Really Big Once, directed by David Herskovits; And Miles to Go, directed by Hal Brooks; After, directed by Stephen Brackett; and Slavey, directed by Robert O’Hara.

In 2015, she originated the role of Suzanne in the premiere of Amélie at Berkeley Rep, directed by Pam MacKinnon.

In 2016, she returned to The Public to play the Nurse in Romeo and Juliet, directed by Lear DeBessonet for the Mobile Shakespeare Unit. In the summer, she played Macbeth in a three-woman production of Macbeth, directed by Lee Sunday Evans, which the New York Times hailed as "irreducible and transcendent," and Jacques in As You Like It, directed by Gaye Taylor Upchurch, both at Hudson Valley Shakespeare Festival.

In spring 2017, Oliveras returned to Broadway in Amélie at the Walter Kerr Theatre in the role of Gina. She subsequently went on to star in We're Gonna Die by Young Jean Lee at the Ancram Opera House.

In spring 2018, she returned to Los Angeles and Center Theatre Group for the premiere of musical Soft Power.

In fall 2018, Oliveras returned to New Haven to co-star with Jennifer Paredes at the premiere of El Huracan by Charise Castro Smith, a play directed by Laurie Woolery at the Yale Repertory Theater.

In spring/summer 2019 and subsequently spring/summer 2022, Oliveras starred as Tolima in Kiss My Aztec, a musical by John Leguizamo and Tony Taccone at Hartford Stage, Berkeley Rep, and La Jolla Playhouse. She has been a part of the development of the show since Atlantic Theatre's Latino MixFest in 2015.

In October 2022, Oliveras began performances as Persephone in the North American tour of the Grammy- and Tony Award-winning musical Hadestown, directed by Rachel Chavkin.

In January 2023, it was announced that Oliveras would return to Broadway as part of the cast of the Second Stage Theater revival of Stephen Adly Guirgis's Between Riverside and Crazy in the role of Church Lady, succeeding Liza Colón-Zayas.

In Fall of 2024, New York Magazine lauded her "sharp and dangerous" turn as Tina in the world premiere of A Woman Among Women by Julia May Jonas at the Bushwick Starr. In Winter 2025, she starred as Belarius and the Queen in National Asian American Theater Company's modern translation of Cymbeline, directed by Stephen Brown-Fried. Maria-Christina received her first Drama Desk Nomination for Best Featured Performance in a Play for her dual roles in Cymbeline.

Her regional credits include Here Lies Love at the Williamstown Theatre Festival; Laura Jacqmin's January Joiner at the Long Wharf, directed by Eric Ting; Jose Rivera’s Boleros for the Disenchanted at the Huntington Theater, directed by Chay Yew; Lynn Nottage’s Fabulation at Baltimore CenterStage, directed by Jackson Gay; the world premiere of Unbeatable, starring Kristy Cates, for which Oliveras received the Arizoni Award for Best Supporting Actress in a Musical; the regional premiere of Rent at the Hangar Theater, directed by Dev Janki; and numerous shows at the Denver Center, Colorado Shakespeare Festival, and Westport Country Playhouse, among others.

Oliveras was the 2014 recipient of the Charles Bowden Actor Award from New Dramatists. She is also a member of the Actors' Center Workshop Company.

Her film and television credits include Viven and the Florist, Time Out of Mind, directed by Oren Moverman; The Humbling, directed by Barry Levinson; The Other Woman, directed by Nick Cassavetes; and St. Vincent, directed by Theodore Melfi. Her television credits include The Blacklist, Madam Secretary, Nurse Jackie, Law & Order: Special Victims Unit, Law & Order: Criminal Intent, Person of Interest, NYC 22, Golden Boy, and Damages.

In 2012, Oliveras was asked to return to Yale University to teach acting and to conduct a number of seminars.
