= Miriam Silverman =

American actress

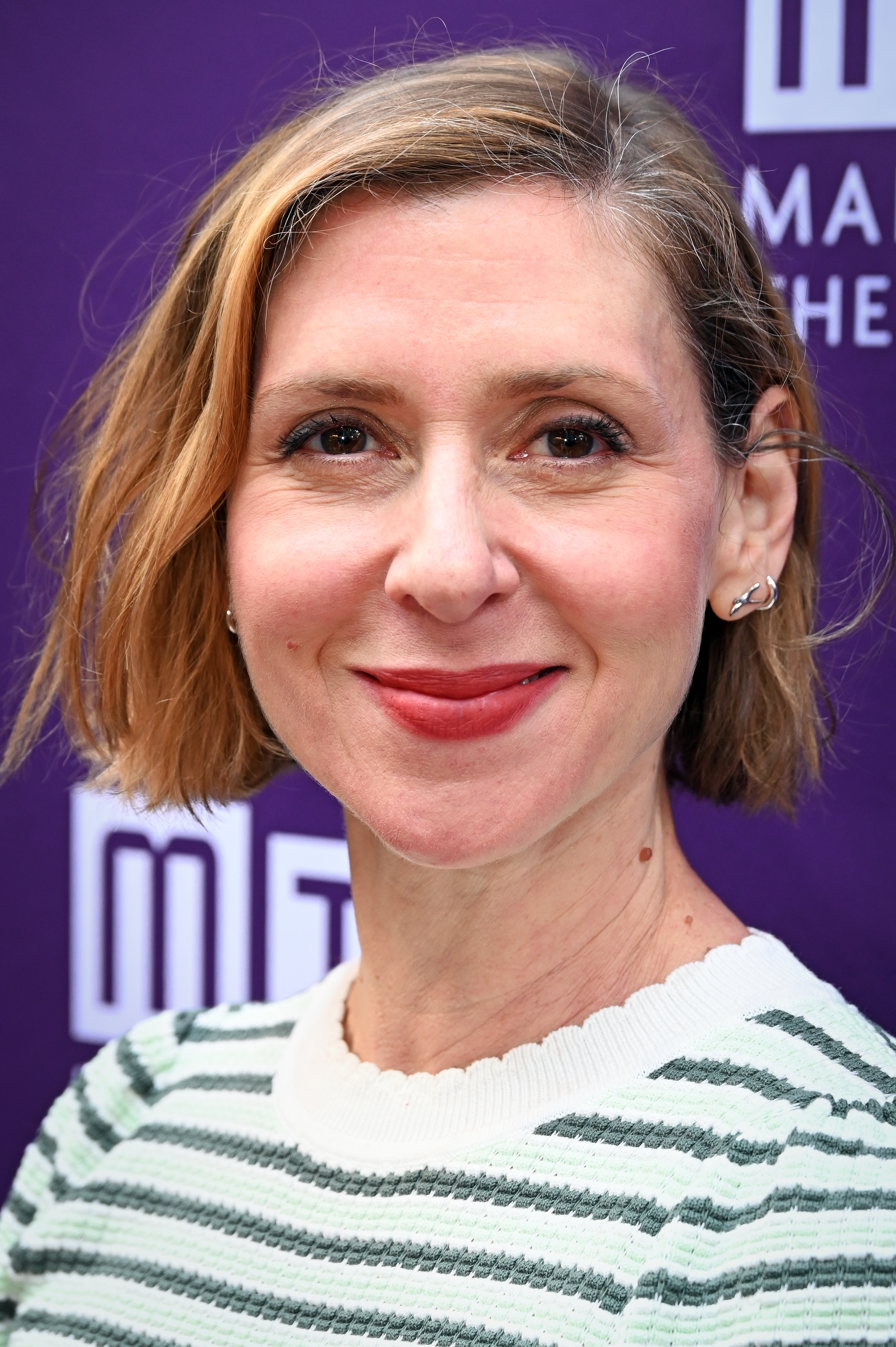
- Silverman in 2026
- Education: Brown University (BA, MFA)
- Occupations: Actor, adjunct teacher
- Spouse: Adam Green (m. 2009)
- Children: 2

Miriam Silverman is an American actress. She is also known for her recurring role as Bernice in the Amazon series The Marvelous Mrs. Maisel and her performances in Hulu's Fleishman Is in Trouble (2022) and Amazon's Dead Ringers (2023). She won the Tony Award for Best Featured Actress in a Play in the 2023 revival of the Lorraine Hansberry play The Sign in Sidney Brustein's Window. She is an acting coach, and currently an adjunct teacher at NYU Tisch School of the Arts.

== Early life and education ==
Silverman was raised in New York City in Manhattan, the daughter of Anita (née Palm 1942–2023). and Michael Silverman. During her mother's pregnancy, Anita was featured on a special segment of Good Morning America documenting Miriam's birth.

She has two brothers, Joseph and Jeffrey. Her mother was a teacher and her father is a journalist and former managing editor of the Associated Press. She attended Bronx High School of Science graduating in 1996. Her interest in acting started at a young age, with her parents taking her to see Broadway shows. She played Rizzo in a school production of Grease and played soccer. She auditioned for LaGuardia High School For The Performing Arts and was accepted, however she turned down the offer and enrolled at Bronx Science, taking the subway from Manhattan.

Silverman graduated from Brown University with a B.A. in Literature and Southeast Asian studies in 2001 and completed a Master of Fine Arts in Acting in 2005. Her first acting role at Brown was Lady Croom in Tom Stoppard's Arcadia. She worked at the Brooklyn Botanic Garden between college semesters.

She took a gap year as an undergraduate to teach English in Hong Kong. In 2012, through a fellowship with Theatre Communications Group, she moved to London to train at the London Academy of Music and Dramatic Art and the Royal Shakespeare Company.

== Career ==
In 2002 she performed in the musical Hot Star, Nebraska at Speakeasy Stage in Boston. In 2008 she performed in a production of Hamlet at the Delacorte Theater. In 2010, she was nominated for a Helen Hayes Award for her performance in The Dog in the Manger with the Shakespeare Theatre Company, where Silverman is a repertory member actor. Silverman is also a repertory member actor for Trinity Repertory Company. She has performed several plays in summerstock in the Berkshires with companys like Berkshire on Stage and the Berkshire Playwrights Lab.

She was nominated for a Jeff Award in 2016 for her performance as the lead female character's older sister Mavis Parodus Bryson in the Goodman Theatre's production of Lorraine Hansberry's The Sign in Sidney Brustein's Window. She reprised this role in the New York productions at the Brooklyn Academy of Music and then on Broadway in April 2023 at the James Earl Jones Theatre. For her performance in the Broadway production, she won the Tony Award for Best Featured Actress in a Play.

She made her Broadway debut in 2017 as Amy in Ayad Akhtar's Junk at the Vivian Beaumont Theater. Her television appearances including episodes of Fleishman Is in Trouble and The Marvelous Mrs. Maisel. She appeared in the film Breaking which premiered at the 2022 Sundance Film Festival. In 2023, Silverman was cast in her first leading film role in Motherland produced by Moving Picture Institute.

== Personal life ==
She married actor Adam Green in 2009. The couple met performing Awake and Sing! at the Arena Stage, directed by Zelda Fichandler. Green, a Harvard graduate, works as the East Coast Union organizer for SAG-AFTRA. The couple lobbied for the Actors' Equity Fair Wage on Stage movement. She is Jewish and a member of the Plaza Jewish Community Chapel.

== Filmography ==
=== Film ===
Year	Project	Role	Venue
2022	Breaking	Hana	feature film debut
2022	Sand Mama	Vera	Short film
2025	Motherland	Cora	
2025	Sacrifice		

=== Television ===
Year	Project	Role	Venue
2009	Law & Order: Criminal Intent	Protest Leader	Episode: Alpha Dog
2011	Pan Am	Mother	Episode: We'll Always Have Paris
2014	Elementary	Support Group Woman	Episode: End of Watch
2019	NOS2A2	June Partridge	2 episodes
2019	Bad Education	Lisa	HBO television film
2021	The Blacklist	Janelle Green	Episode: The Avenging Angel
2022	Blue Bloods	Alcie Abenthy	Episode: Cold Comfort
2022	Fleishman Is in Trouble	Avigayil	Episode: This is My Enjoyment
2022–2023	The Marvelous Mrs. Maisel	Bernice	3 episodes
2023	Dead Ringers	Lara	Episode: One
2025	Your Friends & Neighbors	Gretchen Reagan	8 episodes
2025	Landman	Greta Stidham	2 episodes
2026	Vladimir	Florence	6 episodes

== Theatre ==
Year	Project	Role	Venue	Ref.
2002	Hot Star, Nebraska	Melanie	SpeakEasy Stage, Boston	
2006	Awake and Sing!	Hennie Berger	Arena Stage, Washington, D.C	
2006	The Calamity of Kat Kat and Willie	Kat Kat	Babel Theatre, Off-Broadway	
2006	Bone Portraits	Various	Walkerspace, Off-Broadway	
2006	The Fourth Wise Man	Ensemble	Studio Arena Theatre, Buffalo, New York	
2007	As You Like It	Cecilia	Folger Theatre, Washington D.C	
2007	Syncopation	Anna	Triad Stage, Greensboro, North Carolina	
2008	Peer Gynt	Various	Guthrie Theater, Minneapolis	
2008	Hamlet	Player Queen / Gentlewoman	The Public Theater, Off-Broadway	
2009	A Dog and the Manger	Marcela	Shakespeare Theatre Company, Washington D.C	
2010	The Love Course	Sally	Acorn Theatre, Off-Broadway	
2011	The Witch of Edmonton	Winifred	Theatre At St Clements, Off-Broadway	
2011	Septimus and Clarissa	Elizabeth	Baruch Performing Arts Center, Off-Broadway	
2013	Finks	Natalie	Ensemble Studio Theatre, Off-Broadway	
2014	You Got Older	Hannah	Page 73, Off-Broadway	
2015	A Delicate Ship	Sarah	Playwrights Horizons, Off-Broadway	
2015	Everything You Touch	Jess	Cherry Lane Theatre, Off-Broadway	
2016	The Moors	Emilie	Yale Repertory Theatre, New Haven, Connecticut	
2016	Tiny Beautiful Things	Sugar	The Public Theater, Off-Broadway	
2016	The Sign in Sidney Brustein's Window	Mavis Parodus Bryson	Goodman Theatre, Chicago	
2017	Mary Jane	Brianne / Chaya	Yale Repertory Theatre, New Haven, Connecticut	
2017	Junk	Amy Merkin	Vivian Beaumont Theater, Broadway debut	
2019	A Play Is A Poem	The Wife	Mark Taper Forum, Los Angeles	
2019	Plano	Genevieve	Connelly Theater, Off-Broadway	
2020	Antatomy of a Suicide	Various	Atlantic Theater Company, Off-Broadway	
2020	Cult Of Love	Rachel Dahl	Williamstown Theatre Festival, Regional	
2023	The Sign in Sidney Brustein's Window	Mavis Parodus Bryson	Brooklyn Academy of Music (BAM)	
2023	The Sign in Sidney Brustein's Window	Mavis Parodus Bryson	James Earl Jones Theatre, Broadway	
2024	Macbeth	Lady Macbeth	Red Bull Theatre, Off-Broadway	
2024	Find Me Here	Kristen	Clubbed Thumb, Off-Broadway	
2025	Deep Blue Sound	Mary	Clubbed Thumb (Public Theatre), Off-Broadway	
2026	The Disappear	Mira Blair	Minetta Lane Theatre, Off-Broadway	
2026	The Verge	Claire Archer	The Public Theater, Off-Broadway	

== Awards and nominations ==
Year	Award	Category	Project	Result	Ref.
2010	Helen Hayes Award	Outstanding Supporting Actress, Resident Play	The Dog in The Manger	Nominated	
2013	Drama Desk Award	Outstanding Lead Actress in a Play	Finks	Nominated	
2016	Jeff Award	Outstanding Performer in a Supporting Role in a Play	The Sign in Sidney Brustein's Window	Nominated	
2023	Drama Desk Award	Outstanding Featured Performance in a Play	The Sign in Sidney Brustein's Window	Won	
2023	Tony Awards	Best Featured Actress in a Play	The Sign in Sidney Brustein's Window	Won	
