= Maria Dizzia =

American actress

- Education: Cornell University (BA); University of California, San Diego (MFA)
- Occupation: Actress
- Years active: 1998–present
- Spouse: Will Eno
- Children: 1

Maria Dizzia is an American actress. Dizzia was nominated for the 2010 Tony Award for Best Performance by a Featured Actress in a Play for her performance in In the Next Room (or The Vibrator Play).

== Early life and education ==
Raised in Cranford, New Jersey, Dizzia is the daughter of Lorraine (née Bladis) and John Paul Dizzia. She has a sister. She graduated from Kent Place School in 1993, receiving the Drama Award upon graduation. She studied theater at Cornell University. She received her Master of Fine Arts from the University of California, San Diego.

== Career ==
Dizzia performed the role of Eurydice in the Sarah Ruhl play Eurydice in regional theatre and Off-Broadway at the Second Stage Theatre, from June 18, 2007, to August 26, 2007. She performed in another Sarah Ruhl play In the Next Room on Broadway at the Lyceum Theatre, from October 22, 2009, to January 10, 2010. Her performance as Mrs. Daldry earned her a 2010 Tony Award nomination for Featured Actress in a Play.

Dizzia appeared in the premiere production of the Amy Herzog play Belleville at the Yale Repertory Theatre, from October 21, 2011, to November 12, 2011. She then appeared in the play Off-Broadway at the New York Theatre Workshop from March 3, 2013, to April 14, 2013. She was nominated for the 2013 Drama Desk Award, Outstanding Actress in a Play.

Dizzia has appeared on television in recurring roles on Orange Is the New Black and 13 Reasons Why. On film, she gave a critically acclaimed performance in Martha Marcy May Marlene and, in 2019, played the lead role in the Academy Award winning short, The Neighbors' Window.

Dizzia has also appeared as the mother in the director Owen Kline's debut feature Funny Pages.

== Personal life ==
Dizzia is married to playwright Will Eno and has one child.

== Acting roles ==
=== Film ===
Year	Title	Role	Notes
1998	Sense	Mary	
2009	Whose Dog Is It Anyway?	Grace	Short film
2009	The Ghost and Us	Laura	Short film
2009	The Other Woman	Jaime Brennan	
2011	Down the Shore	Susan	
2011	Martha Marcy May Marlene	Katie	
2011	Margin Call	Executive Assistant	
2012	Keep the Lights On	Vivian	
2012	Lola Versus	Woman Subletter	
2013	Clutter	Sandra	
2013	The Happy Sad	Mandy	
2013	Captain Phillips	Allison McColl	
2013	The Edge of the Woods	Helen	Short film
2013	Sweepstakes	Lori	Short film
2013	Re: Jess	Lara	Short film
2014	X/Y	Sandy	
2014	While We're Young	Marina	
2015	True Story	Mary Jane Longo	
2015	3 Generations	Sinda	
2016	Christine	Jean Reed	
2017	Going in Style	Rachel	
2017	Abe & Phil's Last Poker Game	Angela	
2017	Humor Me	Nirit Gerb-Kroll	
2017	Fits and Starts	Sawyer Edwards	
2018	Piercing	Chevonne	
2018	Vox Lux	Stephanie Dwyer	
2019	Late Night	Joan	
2019	Depraved	Georgina	
2019	Above the Shadows	Victoria Jederman	
2019	The Neighbors' Window	Alli	Short film
2019	William	Barbara Sullivan	
2020	The Outside Story	Juliet	
2022	Funny Pages	Jennifer	
2022	The Good Nurse	Lori Lucas	
2023	The Graduates	Maggie	
2024	My Old Ass	Kathy	
2024	Summer's End	Jeanie	Short film
2024	We Strangers	Jean Laich	
2024	Christmas Eve in Miller's Point	Kathleen	
2025	Plainclothes	Marie	
2026	Anima	Jo	
2026	The Last Day	Diana	
2026	Remain	Sydney	

=== Television ===
Year	Title	Role	Notes
2006	Law & Order: Criminal Intent	Daphne	Episode: "Cruise to Nowhere"
2006	Smith	Nancy Scialfa	3 episodes
2008	Law & Order	Sugar / Melinda Whitman	Episode: "Tango"
2008	Puppy Love	Grace	Web series
2008	Fringe	Emily Kramer	Episode: "The Cure"
2009	A NY Thing	Stella	Television film
2011–2012	Louie	Dolores	3 episodes
2013	The Newsroom	Erica	Episode: "The Genoa Tip"
2013	The Good Wife	Heather Sorentino	Episode: "The Next Day"
2013–2019	Orange Is the New Black	Polly Harper	18 episodes
2015	Elementary	Penny	Episode: "When Your Number's Up"
2015	Master of None	Amanda	Episode: "Plan B"
2016	Horace and Pete	Tricia	3 episodes
2016	The Blacklist	Jeanne Linley	Episode: "Lady Ambrosia (No. 77)"
2016	Royal Pains	Cindy Greene	2 episodes
2017–2019	13 Reasons Why	Mrs. Down	8 episodes
2017	Sea Change	Amelia	Television film
2017	Red Oaks	Professor Beryl Fox	5 episodes
2018	Strangers	Georgie	Episode: "Smash the Plate-triarchy"
2018	The Deuce	Arlene Carmen	Episode: "Seven-Fifty"
2019	Bull	Dr. Margot Statton	Episode: "Parental Guidance"
2019–2020	Emergence	Emily	9 episodes
2020	The Undoing	Diane Porter	2 episodes
2021	Prodigal Son	Sasha Geller	Episode: "The Killabustas"
2021	New Amsterdam	Anne	Episode: "Things Fall Apart"
2021	Modern Love	Lori	Episode: "Am I...? Maybe This Quiz Will Tell Me"
2022	The First Lady	Lucy Mercer Rutherfurd	3 episodes
2022	The Staircase	Lori Campbell	Recurring role
2023–2025	School Spirits	Sandra Nears	Recurring role
2024	Life & Beth	Dr. Morris	3 episodes
2024	Agatha All Along	Rebecca Kaplan	2 episodes
2024	Before	Barbara	Miniseries
2026	Law and Order: SVU	Dr. Ashley Mancini	1 episode

=== Stage ===
Year	Title	Role	Notes
2006	The Wooden Breeks	Tricity	MCC Theater
2007	Eurydice	Eurydice	Second Stage Theatre
2008	The Drunken City	Melissa	Playwrights Horizons
2009–2010	In the Next Room (or The Vibrator Play)	Mrs. Daldry	Lyceum Theatre
2011	Cradle and All	Claire/Annie	Manhattan Theatre Club
2012	Uncle Vanya	Yelena	Soho Repertory Theatre
2013	Belleville	Abby	New York Theatre Workshop
2016	The Layover	Shellie	Second Stage Theatre
2017	If I Forget	Sharon	Roundabout Theatre Company
2020	What the Constitution Means to Me	"Heidi"/Herself	Mark Taper Forum; Broadway Playhouse at Water Tower Place
2022	Macbeth	Lady Macduff	Longacre Theatre
2026	Pre-existing Condition	Director	Greenwich House Theater
