= Mary Jane (play) =

Play written by Amy Herzog

- Broadway Promotional Poster
- Written by: Amy Herzog
- Original language: English
- Subject: Contemporary
- Genre: Drama
- Setting: New York City, Present Day

Premiere
- Date premiered: April 28, 2017
- Place premiered: Yale Repertory Theatre

Mary Jane is a two-act dramatic stage play written by American playwright Amy Herzog. The play had its World Premiere at Yale Repertory Theatre in 2017 and officially premiered on Broadway on April 23, 2024. The Broadway cast is led by Rachel McAdams in the title role. The play won the New York Drama Critics' Circle Award for Best Play in 2018. The play is semi-autobiographical and based on Herzog's daughter Frances, who was born with nemaline myopathy and died at age 11 in 2023.

== Synopsis ==
As Mary Jane navigates both the mundane and the unfathomable realities of caring for Alex, her chronically ill young son, she finds herself building a community of women from many walks of life.

== Characters ==
The following are characters in the play:

- Mary Jane - a mother in her thirties
- Ruthie - a building superintendent
- Sherry - a nurse
- Brianne - a Facebook friend
- Amelia - Sherry's niece, a college student
- Dr. Toros - a pediatric intensivist
- Kat - a music therapist
- Chaya - a Hasidic Jewish woman
- Tenkei - a Buddhist nun

== Notable casts ==
Character	Yale	Off-Broadway	Broadway
Character	2017		2024
Mary Jane	Emily Donahoe	Carrie Coon	Rachel McAdams
Chaya / Brianne	Miriam Silverman	Susan Pourfar	Susan Pourfar
Ruthie / Tenkai	Kathleen Chalfant	Brenda Wehle	Brenda Wehle
Sherry / Dr. Toros	Shona Tucker	Liza Colón-Zayas	April Mathis
Amelia / Kat	Vella Lovell	Danaya Esperanza	Lily Santiago

== Production history ==
The play was first staged by Yale Repertory Theatre from April 28-May 20, 2017, directed by Anne Kauffman. The play was commissioned through Yale's Binger Center for New Theatre. The play was the recipient of the 2016 Edgerton Foundation New Play Award and was also awarded a grant through the Laurents/Hatcher Foundation. It was the second play Herzog had developed at Yale, the first being Belleville. The play was a finalist for the Susan Smith Blackburn Prize, the oldest and largest prize awarded exclusively to women playwrights.

The play was next staged Off-Broadway by the New York Theatre Workshop from September 6 - October 29, 2017. For the title role of Mary Jane, Carrie Coon was nominated for the Drama Desk Award and received an Obie Award for her performance. The Off-Broadway production also received 7 Lucille Lortel nominations.

The play opened on Broadway at the Samuel J. Friedman Theatre as part of Manhattan Theatre Club's 2023–2024 season, again directed by Anne Kauffman. The production began previews on April 2, 2024 and officially opened on April 23, 2024. The production closed after a limited engagement run on June 30, 2024.

== Awards and nominations ==
=== 2017 Off-Broadway debut ===
Year	Award	Category	Nominee	Result	Ref.
2018	Obie Award	Playwriting	Amy Herzog	Won	
2018	Obie Award	Direction	Anne Kauffman	Won	
2018	Obie Award	Actress	Carrie Coon	Won	
2018	Drama Desk Awards	Outstanding Play	Amy Herzog	Nominated	
2018	Drama Desk Awards	Outstanding Actress in a Play	Carrie Coon	Nominated	
2018	New York Drama Critics' Circle Awards	Best Play	Amy Herzog	Won	
2018	Lucille Lortel Award	Outstanding Director	Anne Kauffman	Won	
2018	Lucille Lortel Award	Outstanding Lead Actress in a Play	Carrie Coon	Won	
2018	Lucille Lortel Award	Outstanding Featured Actress in a Play	Liza Colón-Zayas	Nominated	
2018	Lucille Lortel Award	Outstanding Scenic Design	Laura Jellinek	Nominated	
2018	Lucille Lortel Award	Outstanding Lighting Design	Japhy Weideman	Nominated	
2018	Lucille Lortel Award	Outstanding Sound Design	Leah Gelpe	Won	

=== 2024 Broadway ===
Year	Award	Category	Nominee	Result	Ref.
2024	Tony Awards	Best Play	Amy Herzog	Nominated	
2024	Tony Awards	Best Actress in a Play	Rachel McAdams	Nominated	
2024	Tony Awards	Best Direction of a Play	Anne Kauffman	Nominated	
2024	Tony Awards	Best Sound Design of a Play	Leah Gelpe	Nominated	
2024	Drama Desk Award	Outstanding Lead Performance in a Play	Rachel McAdams	Nominated	
2024	Drama League Award	Outstanding Revival of a Play		Nominated	
2024	Drama League Award	Distinguished Performance	Rachel McAdams	Nominated	
2024	Outer Critics Circle Awards	Outstanding Revival of a Play		Nominated	
2024	Outer Critics Circle Awards	Outstanding Lead Performer in a Play	Rachel McAdams	Nominated	
2024	Theatre World Award		Rachel McAdams	Won	
