= Full Gallop =

1993 play by Mark Hampton and Mary Louise Wilson

Full Gallop is a one-woman play written by Mark Hampton and Mary Louise Wilson. It tells the story of fashion icon Diana Vreeland and her return to New York City following a four-month escape to Paris after her public and scandalous firing from Vogue in 1971. It was first performed in 1993.

== Performance history ==
The play was first produced as a work in progress at the Bay Street Theater in Sag Harbor, New York in 1993 with Mary Louise Wilson as Diana Vreeland. It had its world premiere in 1995 at the Old Globe Theatre in San Diego, with Wilson again as Vreeland. She continued with the role in two New York City engagements, in 1995 at Manhattan Theatre Club and in 1996 at the Westside Theatre directed by Nicholas Martin. Elizabeth Ashley portrayed Diana Vreeland in a West Coast staging in 1998.

Cherie Gil played Vreeland at the Carolos P. Romulo Theater in 2014. Mercedes Ruehl played the role of Vreeland in 2015 at The Old Globe Theatre in San Diego.

Patti LuPone will star in the show when it returns to Off-Broadway in January 2027 at Stage II. The first preview is January 8, and regular performances begin January 17.
