= Stan Wojewodski Jr. =

American academic

Stan Wojewodski Jr. is an American professor and theatre director. From 1975 to 1991 he was the artistic director of Baltimore Center Stage, from 1991 to 2002 he was the dean of the Yale School of Drama, and from 2010 to 2018 was the chair of theatre at Southern Methodist University Meadows School of the Arts, where he was appointed a professor in 2007. Wojewodski directed a production of Christopher Marlowe’s Edward II at the Yale Repertory Theatre in New Haven, Connecticut from March 12th to April 11th 1992.
