= 4000 Miles =

2011 play by Amy Herzog

- Original language: English
- Written by: Amy Herzog
- Genre: Dramatic comedy

Premiere
- Date: June 20, 2011
- Place: The Duke on 42nd Street

4000 Miles is a dramatic comedy play by Amy Herzog. The play ran Off-Broadway in 2011, and again in 2012. The play was a finalist for the 2013 Pulitzer Prize for Drama.

== Synopsis ==
When Leo Joseph-Connell suffers a major loss while on a cross-country bike trip, he seeks solace from his feisty grandmother Vera Joseph in her West Village apartment.

== Characters ==
- Leo Joseph-Connell – twenty-one
- Vera Joseph – ninety-one
- Bec – twenty-one
- Amanda – nineteen, Chinese-American

== Background ==
The character of "Vera Joseph," who initially appeared in Herzog's play After the Revolution, is based on Herzog's grandmother Leepee. Herzog used Leepee's "words, habits and history to fashion the character of Vera Joseph".

Backstage observed that "'4000 Miles' is a bit of a companion piece to 'After the Revolution,' her captivating political family drama ... as both plays contain the character of Vera Joseph, a no-nonsense 91-year-old grandmother who's also a member of the Communist Party. Vera is as interesting here as she was in the earlier play, but the story surrounding her is considerably slighter." Leo is based on her cousin who lost a good friend. The "Josephs" in her plays are also partially based on her father's stepfamily.

== Original casts ==
Character	2011 Off-Broadway cast	2013 UK premiere cast	2013 Chicago premiere cast
Vera Joseph	Mary Louise Wilson	Sara Kestelman	Mary Ann Thebus
Leo Joseph-Connell	Gabriel Ebert	Daniel Boyd	Josh Salt
Bec	Zoë Winters	Jenny Hulse	Caroline Neff
Amanda	Greta Lee	Jing Lusi	Emjoy Gavino

== Productions ==
The play premiered Off-Broadway at the Duke on 42nd Street Theatre, opening on June 20, 2011, and closing on July 9, 2011. The play then ran Off-Broadway at the Mitzi E. Newhouse Theater at the Lincoln Center Theater in March 2012 through June 17, 2012. It was the first play in Lincoln Center Theater's new works program. The play, directed by Daniel Aukin, featured Mary Louise Wilson as Vera and Gabriel Ebert as Leo Joseph-Connell.

The play was a finalist for the 2013 Pulitzer Prize for Drama. In a Playbill article on the possible Pulitzer Prize winner, Robert Simonson wrote that 4000 Miles "is a gentle, warm drama ... Critics found Herzog's naturalistic tapestry touching, compassionate and authentically felt." The Pulitzer Prize citation reads "a drama that shows acute understanding of human idiosyncrasy as a spiky 91-year-old locks horns with her rudderless 21-year-old grandson who shows up at her Greenwich Village apartment after a disastrous cross-country bike trip."

The play won the 2012 Obie Award for Best New American Play, and was named Time magazine's #1 Play or Musical of 2012.

The European premiere was at Bath Theatre Royal, from April 11, 2013 to May 11, 2013. Directed by James Dacre, the cast featured Sara Kestleman as Vera.

The play was performed at the Long Wharf Theater (New Haven, Connecticut) opening in February 2014 starring Micah Stock. The play was performed by the American Conservatory Theater (A.C.T.) in San Francisco in January and February 2013, directed by Mark Rucker with Reggie Gowland and Susan Blommaert in the lead roles. It was produced by Artists Repertory Theatre in Portland, Oregon in April 2015.

The play's Sydney premiere was staged at Australian Theatre for Young People in 2013, produced by MopHead and Catnip Productions. It starred Diana McLean, Stephen Multari, Eloise Snape and Aileen Huynh. The production was critically acclaimed, earning two Sydney Theatre Award nominations and subsequently toured to Brisbane's La Boite Theatre Company in 2014 and completed a national tour in 2016.

The Old Vic Theatre was due to stage a revival in April 2020, starring Timothée Chalamet as Leo Joseph-Connell and Eileen Atkins as Vera, directed by Matthew Warchus. However, it was delayed due to the COVID-19 pandemic. In May 2022 it was revealed the production had been cancelled. In February 2023, it was confirmed the show had been rescheduled to play at the Minerva Theatre, Chichester from May 4 to June 10, 2023, with Atkins as Vera and Sebastian Croft as Leo.

== Critical response ==
Charles Isherwood, in his review for The New York Times called it a "finely wrought play."

The Time magazine reviewer wrote: "Herzog unravels the details slowly, with uncommon narrative skill. ... Everything about 4000 Miles seems fresh, particularized, plausible. ... 4000 Miles is the family drama that really sticks with you, easily the best play of the season."

John Shand wrote in his review in the Sydney Morning Herald: "If your heart is sick or just needs warming, go and see this play. If you are a baby boomer who doesn't understand your grandchildren or are from Gen Y and, like, really weirded out by your grandparents, go and see this play. If you simply love theatre, go and see this play."
