= Lydia (play) =

2008 magical realist drama by playwright Octavio Solis

Lydia is a magical realist drama by Latino-American playwright Octavio Solis. The play first premiered in the Space Theatre at the Denver Center for the Performing Arts on January 24, 2008. The production was directed by Juliette Carrillo. The play is partially inspired by Octavio Solis's own experiences growing up in El Paso, Texas. It explores the experience of a Mexican-American family living on the Texas–Mexico border, trying to live out their own version of the American Dream amidst the aftermath of an accident that changes all of their lives.

== Character List ==
Ceci, the sister, aged 17
Misha, the younger brother, age 16
Rene, the older brother, age 19
Rosa, the mother
Claudio, the father
Alvaro, the cousin, age 22
Lydia, the maid

== Plot summary ==
Act 1: The play opens with Ceci lying on her mattress in the Flores' family living room. She is in a semi-vegetative state for most of the play, making guttural noises for speech and barely being able to move her own body. This is because of a car crash that caused severe brain damage when she was fifteen. Throughout the play she has moments where she shape-shifts into the young woman she was before the accident. The play begins with Ceci having one of these moments, and she introduces each member of her family. Her mother Rosa has dealt with the pain of the car crash by becoming a devout Christian who believes that only God can make everything right. Ceci's younger brother Misha is a good boy who does well in school and likes to write poetry, while her older brother Rene is the bad boy who deals with his guilt over the accident via drinking and violent gay-bashing. Her father Claudio escapes by watching TV with his headphones on incessantly. To help with the family's financial situation, Rosa is about to go back to work, and she has hired an undocumented maid to care for Ceci and help with the cooking and cleaning. The maid arrives, and she immediately has a special connection with Ceci: she knows what Ceci needs and wants despite the fact that Ceci cannot talk coherently. The changes in the household upon Lydia's arrival become immediately apparent. The house is cleaner, the family is eating better, and Ceci seems to be happier. Alvaro, who is Rene, Misha and Ceci's cousin, has been away fighting in Vietnam for the last two years, but he is now back and he visits the family for the first time since the accident. He tells them that he is going to be working on border patrol now. Lydia brings Ceci out in what would have been her Quinceanera dress if she had not been in the accident. Claudio enters and gets angry because of Ceci wearing the dress and Misha takes the blame. Claudio takes Misha outside and brutally beats him as punishment. After Alvaro has left and Rene has fled the house in a state of grief and anger, Lydia tends to Misha's wounds. Misha reads her his poetry, which she says is good but lacks humanness. After Misha goes to bed Claudio enters and Lydia confronts him about what he did to Misha. Lydia realizes what Claudio needs in order to get out of his persistent state of escape and she has sex with him in the living room. This is another moment where Ceci shape-shifts into her old self and narrates what is occurring. Unknown to any of them, Rene sees it all.

Act 2: The second act opens with a flashback sequence of Ceci, Misha, Rene and Alvaro pretending to be ants when they were kids. Within this dream-like flashback sequence, the shadows of Alvaro and Rene kiss behind a sheet. After this the play returns to present reality and Rosa gives Misha a gold Cross pen because she feels guilty for not being able to stop Claudio from beating him up. Rosa then takes Lydia shopping, and also, it is later revealed, to see about getting her papers so she can stay in America legally. Alvaro visits again and another flashback occurs, in which Ceci asks Alvaro to be her first dance at her Quinceanera after her father's dance. She also wants to know what he and Rene are planning to do that night and she wants to come, but Alvaro won't tell her and says she cannot come. Ceci then professes her love for Alvaro and they kiss. Returning to the present, Rosa returns with Lydia and Rene. Alvaro gives Rene a jacket he bought him in Vietnam, then lets it slip that he loves him. Rene gets extremely angry and reveals that he saw Lydia and Claudio having sex. Rosa and Misha ask what is actually going on between Rene and Alvaro. Lydia says that Ceci will tell them what actually happened the night of the accident, and proceeds to "translate" for Ceci. There are moments when Ceci speaks for herself, but to the family everything is coming from Lydia. Ceci tells the story through Lydia of that night, where she says she snuck into the back seat of Rene's car, wanting to surprise Alvaro when Rene picked him up. She heard Alvaro get into the car, and then heard them kissing and Alvaro saying that they should go to the border like they always do. Rene and Alvaro had sex in the front seat of the car as Ceci listened from the back, getting angrier and angrier because she was in love with Alvaro too. When they were done and started to drive away, she jumped up screaming at Rene. She started pummeling him over the head so he couldn't see where he was driving, and the car swerved and crashed into the telephone pole. Rosa is completely shocked at this story, and after Rene admits it is true, he throws the jacket Alvaro gave him on the ground and leaves the house, never to return. Rosa whispers something to Alvaro and he goes to Lydia's room and pulls her out of the house to Misha's protestations. She will be sent back to Mexico as an illegal immigrant. After Alvaro leaves with Lydia, Claudio enters and he and Rosa go to bed together. Misha is left alone with Ceci, and he goes to give her her physical therapy. She struggles and is able to say his name once. Then she guides his fingers under her dress. He reluctantly does what he knows she wants and in her ecstasy Ceci sets the pull-tab on her blanket on her tongue and swallows it.

== Background of Setting ==
Lydia is set in the early 1970s, at a time when civil rights had become a focal point for change. The civil rights movement was waning, and the African-American fight for equality had become an inspiration for other oppressed minority groups, such as the Mexican-American people. With the civil rights movement as a source of inspiration and a guide, Mexican-Americans started what is referred to as the Chicano Movement, seeking greater rights for themselves and their undocumented relations.

At the same time, the Vietnam War was becoming an ever-bigger catalyst for anti-war sentiment in the United States, and it became evident that most war casualties came from the working class. Chicano youth in the movement viewed this from a racial perspective, arguing that the Mexican-Americans and other minorities were carrying the main burden of the war.

All of this historical background of the setting plays a significant role in Lydia, which is set in Texas on the Mexican–American border in the early 1970s. The character of Alvaro highlights the issues pertaining to the Vietnam War as the family deals with his absence and safe return. The Flores family highlights the struggles of a minority working-class family trying to make it in a country that is biased against their traditional Mexican culture and language. It shows their efforts to conform, specifically with their language, in order to survive. The setting also affects Lydia through the character of Lydia herself, an illegal immigrant who came to American seeking work and a chance at a better life. Octavio Solis grounded this exploration in his own experience growing up with two undocumented parents who would hire illegal maids to help in the home. As the Chicano Movement began to take root and thrive, this issue of immigration and illegal workers was a focus in the movement, and the characters of Lydia and Claudio (the undocumented father of the family), are affected strongly by this issue. The play as a whole arises and thrives in the turmoil and conflict created from the place and time period in which it is set.

== Themes ==
Perhaps the most prominent theme is that of family. The Flores family's relationships with one another and how they interact serve as the catalyst for much of the conflict throughout the play. Within this, the theme of sex is dealt with in depth. The play highlights how sexual desires bring the characters to make decisions and take actions they otherwise would not have. Along with this, a more subtle theme is that of homophobia. Even the characters who have homosexual desires seem at the same time to be homophobic, causing them much inner conflict and turmoil. The play also deals with the theme of the American dream. The Flores family must reconcile their current lives with their hopes of what the American dream would have to offer them. The setting of the play on the El Paso, Texas and Mexican border highlights many themes in itself. One of these is that of illegal immigration foremost through the character of Lydia and on a lesser level through Claudio. The play is riddled with the issue of Lydia's illegality and how the family deals with that. This, along with the central focus on a Mexican-American family, brings into question the rights of and respect given to minorities in the United States, and if it is enough. The last central theme is that of disability. Ceci's shifts from semi-vegetative state to fully functioning human makes the viewer question the stereotypical views of disability.

== Production History ==
- Teatro Nagual at The SOFIA, Sacramento, CA (2022)
- Teatro Espejo at California Stage, Sacramento, CA (2018)
- Strawberry Theatre Workshop, Seattle, WA (2017)
- UTEP Studio Theater, El Paso TX (2017)
- Cara Mia Theatre Company, Dallas TX (2015)
- Napa Valley Conservatory Theatre (2015)
- National Pastime Theatre, Chicago (2013)
- Center Theatre Group/Mark Taper Forum (2009)
- Marin Theatre Company (2009)
- The Yale Repertory Theatre (2009)
- Attic Rep, San Antonio, TX (2009)
- The Denver Center for the Performing Arts (2008)

== Awards ==
- 2008 Denver Post Ovation Award, Best Production
- 2008 Henry Award, Outstanding New Play
- 2010 Nominee for GLAAD Award for Outstanding Los Angeles Theatre
