= Charise Castro Smith =

American actress, playwright and filmmaker (born 1983)

- Born: August 30, 1983 (age 43); Miami, Florida, U.S.
- Education: Brown University (BA); Yale University (MFA)
- Occupations: Playwright; actress; screenwriter; producer; director
- Spouse: Joby Earle

Charise Castro Smith (born August 30, 1983) is an American actress, playwright, screenwriter, producer, and director. She is best known for co-writing and co-directing the Disney animated film Encanto (2021).

== Personal life ==
Castro Smith is from Miami, Florida, where she was raised in a Cuban American family. She attended Brown University as an undergraduate student and later the Yale School of Drama, where she earned her MFA in acting. Previous to graduate school, she was a city schoolteacher. She lives in LA and is married to actor Joby Earle, whom she met at Yale.

== Education ==
After receiving her BA from Brown, Castro Smith attended the Yale School of Drama for her Master's in Fine Arts (MFA). Although she was studying acting, she wrote a play Estrella Cruz [the junkyard queen] that was produced at the Yale Cabaret, the student-run theatre. From this, Paula Vogel, head of the playwrighting program at the time, began to act as a mentor to her. After graduating, Castro Smith worked primarily as an actor until she was selected for the Van Lier Fellowship Program in 2012–2013 at the New Dramatists in New York. This led her to embrace playwriting as a career, which led to writing and producing for television.

== Career ==
=== Artistic inspiration ===
Many of Castro Smith's plays are comedic, relationship-focused, and often politically relevant. She notably wants to create more complex, dimensional roles for women on stage in leading roles. Her plays have been inspired by an eclectic mix of works, such as Shakespeare, South Park, Greek myths, and 1970s horror films.

=== Playwright career ===
In 2008, Castro Smith's first play Estrella Cruz [The Junkyard Queen] was produced at the Yale Cabaret, and was later produced at the Ars Nova ANT Fest in New York City and at the Halcyon Theater in Chicago. The play is a Cuban-American twist of a Greek myth of the goddess Persephone set in the 21st century.

In 2011, Smith's play Boomcracklefly was produced at the Milgaro Theater in Portland, Oregon.

In 2014, her play The Hunchback of Seville was produced by the Washington Ensemble Theatre in Seattle. Acclaimed as a "gleefully revisionist riff on rampaging colonialism," The Hunchback of Seville was inspired by Smith's interest in how Americans handle the history of Columbus and the massacres that resulted from his actions. The complex character of Queen Isabella stems from Smith's own desire to play Richard III in Shakespeare's Richard III.

Smith's most produced work, Feathers and Teeth, was featured at the Goodman Theater's New Stage Festival (2013–2014). Inspired by Hamlet, 1970s horror films, and Jon Ronson's book The Psychopath Test: A Journey Through the Madness Industry, Feathers and Teeth centers on a 13-year-old girl who loses her mom and thinks her new step-mother is a demon. As with Smith's other plays, Feathers and Teeth features a complex, "crazy" female lead in an eccentric and comedic play. Ultimately, Smith's goal was to use horror as a way to help others understand the human experience of obsession and fear. The play was later produced at Artists Repertory Theatre in Portland, Oregon.

In 2017 Castro Smith's work El Huracán, featured at the DNA New Work Series at La Jolla Playhouse, is described as loosely connected to the ideas of Shakespeare's The Tempest. It premiered in 2018 at Yale Repertory Theatre, starring Jennifer Paredes, Maria-Christina Oliveras, and directed by Laurie Woolery.

=== Television career ===
In 2015, Castro Smith made her television writing debut with the Lifetime series Devious Maids. In 2016 she served as both a writer and producer on the Fox television series The Exorcist, as well as writer and co-executive producer of the ABC pilot The Death of Sofia Valdez. In 2018 she went on to serve as writer and supervising producer for the Netflix series The Haunting of Hill House. And in 2019, Castro Smith wrote and co-executive produced the Starz series Sweetbitter.

In February 2024 it was announced that Academy award nominee America Ferrera would star in and executive produce an Amazon Prime Video series based on the Katz' 1990 book Naked by the Window: The Fatal Marriage of Carl Andre and Ana Mendieta. The series will be scripted by Castro Smith and co-executive produced by Amazon MGM Studios and Plan B Entertainment.

=== Films ===
Castro Smith made her film debut in a Walt Disney Animation Studios film, titled Encanto, centered on a Colombian girl who lacks magical powers in spite of her family having them. Castro Smith co-directed the film alongside Zootopia co-directors Byron Howard and Jared Bush, and co-wrote the screenplay alongside Bush.

== Artist credits ==
=== Playwriting credits ===
- Estrella Cruz [The Junkyard Queen] (Yale Cabaret (2008) / Ars Nova ANT Fest (2011) / Halcyon Theatre (2016))
- Boomcracklefly (Milagro Theater)
- The Hunchback of Seville (Brown Trinity Playwrights Rep/Washington Ensemble Theatre)
- Feathers and Teeth (Goodman Theater in New Stage Festivals (2013–2014))
- That High Lonesome Sound (Acting Apprentice Company (2014–2015)) [co-writer]
- Washeteria (Soho Rep, one episode (2015)) [co-writer]
- El Huracán (La Jolla Playhouse's DNA New Work Series (2016))

=== Acting credits ===
- Chain of Fools (The Guthrie Theater) (2009)
- Jane Says (The Public Theater: New Work Now!) (2010)
- The Good Wife (2010)
- Body of Proof (2011)
- Unforgettable (2012)
- The Pilgrim & the Private Eye (2012)
- An Enemy of the People (Baltimore Center Stage) (2012)
- Antony and Cleopatra (Royal Shakespeare Company/GableStage/The Public Theater) (2014)
- The Art of Preservation (The Flea Theater)
- The Germ Project (New Georges/ 3LD Arts and Technology Center)
- The Voices in my Head (Ars Nova)

=== TV producing/writing credits ===
- Devious Maids (2015) "Talk of the Town" "The Turning Point"
- The Exorcist (2016) "Chapter Seven: Father of Lies"
- The Death of Eva Sofia Valdez (2016)
- The Haunting of Hill House (2018)
- Sweetbitter (2019)

=== Film credits ===
- Encanto - 2021 - co-director, story, and screenplay
