= Stunning (play) =

2008 stage play by David Adjmi

- Original language: English
- Written by: David Adjmi
- Genre: Drama
- Setting: Brooklyn, U.S., 1970s.

Premiere
- Date: March 16, 2008
- Place: Woolly Mamoth Theatre

Stunning is a dramatic stage play written by American playwright David Adjmi.

The play tells the story of sixteen-year-old Lily, who lives in a Syrian-Jewish community in Brooklyn with her much older husband. Her worldview changes after an unlikely friendship with her African-American maid.

== Production history ==
=== Washington D.C. (2008) ===
The play premiered in Washington D.C with the Woolly Mammoth Theatre Company, running from March 10-April 6. The production was directed by Anne Kauffman. The show was nominated for five Helen Hayes Awards, including for the Charles MacArthur Award for Outstanding New Play or Musical.

=== Off-Broadway (2009) ===
The play premiered Off-Broadway at The Duke On 42nd Street Theatre, with performance dates from June 1-June 28, 2009, again directed by Kaufman. For her performance, Cristin Milioti was nominated for a Lucille Lortel Award for Best Actress.

== Original cast and characters ==
Character	Washington D.C. (2008)	Off-Broadway (2009)
Lily Schwecky	Laura Heisler	Cristin Milioti
Blanche Nesbitt	Quincy Tyler Bernstine	Charlayne Woodard
Ike Schwecky	Michael Gabriel Goodfriend	Danny Mastrogiorgio
Claudine Dushey	Gabriela Fernandez-Coffey	Sas Goldberg
Jojo Dweck	Clinton Brandhagen	Steven Rattazzi
Shelly Dweck	Abby Wood	Jeanine Serralles
