= The Sign in Sidney Brustein's Window =

1964 play by Lorraine Hansberry

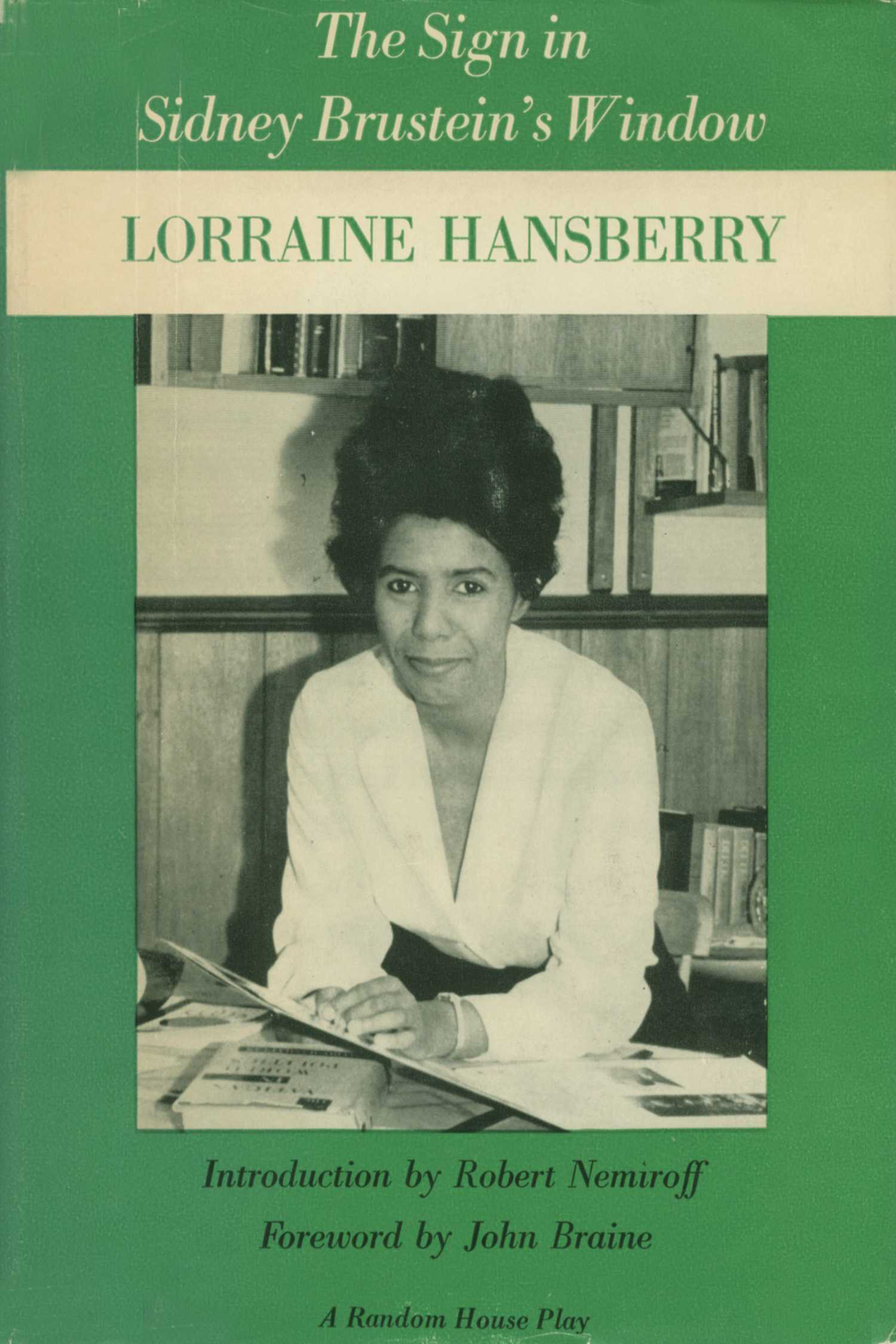
- First-edition book cover
- Written by: Lorraine Hansberry
- Setting: The early 1960s. In the Brusteins' apartment and adjoining courtyard in Greenwich Village, New York City.

Premiere
- Date: October 15, 1964
- Place: Longacre Theatre, New York City, New York, United States

The Sign in Sidney Brustein's Window is the second and last staged play by playwright Lorraine Hansberry, author of A Raisin in the Sun. The play focuses on events that occur after Sidney hangs a political sign urging an end to bossism in the window of his Greenwich Village apartment. Chaos ensues in his marriage and personal relationships and raises questions about Bohemian culture, Judaism, race, suicide, homosexuality, political corruption, interracial love, and prostitution.

The play premiered October 15, 1964 and received mixed reviews. Hansberry, who was ill at the time, died two days after the final performance of the show’s run. The original production starred Gabriel Dell and Rita Moreno as Sidney and Iris Brustein respectively. The play was revived on Broadway in 1972 and 2023.

== Synopsis ==
The Sign in Sidney Brustein's Window depicts Sidney, an intellectual writer and his wife, Iris, who are in a difficult marriage. Sidney struggles through life in New York City's Greenwich Village neighborhood as an unsuccessful artist. His ideals cause him to avoid politics and its corruption while facing a painful home life. Iris is a struggling actress who, during the course of the play, leaves her antagonistic husband to enter the television scene. Both Sidney and Iris attack each other's self-confidence through extensive dialogue, despite their affection for each other.

Alton Scales is an African-American activist and Sidney's friend who falls in love with Iris' beautiful sister Gloria, a supposed international model. He is able to persuade Sidney to support the candidacy of Wally O’Hara despite Sidney's initial refusal to incorporate politics into his newly established artistic newspaper. Wally is a local reform politician who is appalled by the extensive drug use in Greenwich Village and the surrounding area. Sidney agrees to support him but later learns of O’Hara’s corruption; afterwards Sidney harbors significant hatred for the reform politician.

Gloria's idealistic image is shattered when Alton learns that she is a prostitute and not an international model as she and her sister Iris had insisted. Wrought with anguish at the idea of his beloved being used as a commodity, and tying it to the same ideology used to justify the African slave trade (to which he traces his roots), Alton leaves Gloria. In an act of desperation and shame, she dies by suicide.

Attributing Gloria's suicide to the campaigning slogans of Wally, Sidney develops a position in opposition to the politician. This creates problems that reconcile Sidney and Iris. The play ends with a scene of Sidney and Iris in a devastated embrace at the loss of Gloria. Iris indicates with her last lines of the play that she wants to come home. Sidney makes a silent agreement that they will figure everything out. Despite the constant dark bickering that the two had throughout the play, it closes while the two are interlocked as the sun rises.

The play is presented in various ways through its acts: Act I consists of dialogue, Act II consists of multiple monologues tying together Acts I and Act II, while Act III ends tragically, concluding the play.

== History ==
Lorraine Hansberry, the author of The Sign in Sidney Brustein's Window, had several works produced prior to this piece. Hansberry used to write for a paper as an author before deciding to write her first play. Before becoming a playwright, she actively wrote for groups promoting African-American rights. She published a piece produced by the Student Nonviolent Coordinating Committee, advocating for the well being of African Americans. Hansberry's personal past, values, and involvement with ideological movements heavily influenced thematic elements in her plays. Her first piece as a playwright, A Raisin in the Sun, drew attention to her as not only an author but as a playwright. This piece received several awards and was the first Broadway production written by an African-American woman. After this play, Hansberry continued to write, leading to the production of her next play, The Sign in Sidney Brustein's Window.

== Cast and characters ==
Character	Broadway 1964	Broadway Revival 1972	Second Broadway Revival 2023
Sidney Brustein	Gabriel Dell	Hal Linden	Oscar Isaac
Iris Parodus Brustein	Rita Moreno	Zohra Lampert	Rachel Brosnahan
Mavis Parodus Bryson	Alice Ghostley	Frances Sternhagen	Miriam Silverman
Gloria Parodus	Cynthia O'Neal	Kelly Wood	Gus Birney
Alton Scales	Ben Aliza	John Danelle	Julian De Niro
David Ragin	John Alderman	William Atherton	Glenn Fitzgerald
Wally O'Hara	Frank Schofield	Mason Adams	Andy Grotelueschen
Max	Dolph Sweet	Dolph Sweet	Raphael Nash Thompson

=== Broadway ===
The Sign in Sidney Brustein's Window opened on Broadway at the Longacre Theatre on October 15, 1964, and was directed by Peter Kass. It transferred to Henry Miller's Theatre on December 29, 1964. It played its final performance Sunday, January 10, 1965, two days before Hansberry passed away. Jack Blackman designed scenery, Jules Fisher designed lighting, and Fred Voelpel designed costumes. The original Broadway cast featured Gabriel Dell as Sidney Brustein, Rita Moreno as Iris Parodus Brustein, Ben Aliza as Alton Scales, Frank Schofield as Wally O'Hara, Dolph Sweet as Max, Alice Ghostley as Mavis Parodus Bryson, John Alderman as David Ragin, Cynthia O'Neal as Gloria Parodus, and Joseph Elic as the policeman. Ten days after opening night, it was announced that the play was in jeopardy of closing. On November 30, 1964, actor and playwright Ossie Davis made an appeal for funds following a matinee performance, which raised only $5,000.

=== Chicago ===
In 2016 the play was performed in the author's hometown at the Goodman Theatre to a positive critical response.

=== 2023 B.A.M. Production & Broadway Revival ===
In 2023 the play opened at the Brooklyn Academy of Music, directed by Anne Kauffman and starring Oscar Isaac as Sidney Brustein and Rachel Brosnahan as Iris Parodus Brustein. It was announced on April 4, 2023 that the production would transfer to the James Earl Jones Theatre on Broadway, with an opening date set for April 27, 2023, the final day of the 2022-2023 Broadway season.

== Response ==
=== Critical reception ===
Howard Taubman wrote in The New York Times following the opening performance of The Sign in Sidney Brustein's Window that the play "lacks concision and cohesion" and that "one remembers isolated passages rather than the work as a whole."

== Dramatic analysis ==
The Sign in Sidney Brustein's Window was first on stage in the 1960s, a time of great social reform in America. Carl and Nanie Hansberry, Lorraine Hansberry's parents, were leaders in the Civil Rights Movement, and her parents' values affected her writing.

=== Social movements ===
One prominent social movement in The Sign in Sidney Brustein's Window is the non-conformist or bohemian movement. The play revolves around Sidney Brustein and his non-conformist lifestyle. The setting is Sidney's apartment in Greenwich Village. Hansberry describes this area as "bohemia" – a place where people relish living an unglamorous and nontraditional life. Sidney's apartment parallels the bohemian atmosphere in Greenwich Village. The apartment differs from contemporary homes because it has an endearing "carelessness." Sidney's style even goes against social norms, rather than the "toggle-coated, woven, mustardy, corduroy appearance". Sidney dresses without concern for what others think.

Iris's sister, Mavis Parodus, is a source of contempt for Sidney because she is "the Mother of MiddleClass itself" and her prejudices. The interaction between Mavis and Sidney in Act 1, Scene 2 show Sidney's contempt for Mavis, and her anti-African-American prejudice and anti-Semitism. When Mavis leaves Sidney's apartment, she makes comments on how the bohemian culture isn't as enlightened as they believe. It isn't until Sidney experiences a change in understanding that he sees Mavis's true colors and realize that she also has the qualities of "awareness, sensitivity, integrity, and, above all, the capacity for growth." Sidney also develops a better understanding for Mavis in their last scene.

Aspects of The Sign in Sidney Brustein's Window can be seen as Hansberry's reaction to a popular movement in theatre, Theatre of the Absurd, a form of drama that mixed clarity with absurdity, profundity with ridiculousness. It was understood to reflect the lack of coherence in most people's lives, and the endless search for meaning in a life with no purpose, no certainty, no god, and no absolute values. Hansberry's play juxtaposes a character who writes absurdist plays, David Ragin, and the socially concerned Sidney Brustein. The arguments of the two display Hansberry's critique of searching for meaning; instead, she argues through Sidney Brustein, one should search for how to live. The humanist in Sidney reflects Hansberry's commitment to social values and human rights.

=== Underground press ===
The underground press was a movement during the 1960s that gave rise to independent, bohemian newspapers. These papers were easily accessible to amateurs because newspaper production became cost-effective after photo-offset printing.

In the play, Harvey Wyatt "unloads" a small, community paper on Sidney, which is representative of the underground press movement. Sidney cites that he wants the paper to be a part of the Greenwich Village culture. The amateur, counter-culture quality this paper is reflected in the "artistic" approach Max takes when designing the layout for the paper. In Act 1 scene 2, Alton and Max disagree about the nameplate, which Max puts in a small font at the bottom of the page.

=== Racial and cultural traditions ===
Margaret Wilkerson, an acclaimed African-American historian and playwright, criticized the play because it was not about the "black experience." Sidney Brustein, a white, Jewish male, is the main character. Hansberry's only African-American character is Alton. Sidney has deep connection with his Judaism, and with that connection comes an understanding of oppression, which connects him with the oppressed African Americans of that time period. This connection is represented in Sidney's feelings for Alton.

Hansberry also connects Sidney with the Gay rights movement in the 1960s through David, a gay playwright. Sidney has disputes with David, but he offers support and advice for David's troubles. Sidney's opinion on dealing with prejudices are "aggressive," and they mimic Hansberry's opinions on dealing with prejudice.

== Themes and motifs ==
The Sign in Sidney Brustein's Window reflects many cultural disputes of the time one of which is women's struggle for equality. The women in the play struggle to be recognized in a male-dominated world. Iris Brustein, the wife of the title character, is chastised by Sidney for her costly acting classes while he constantly makes equally flippant monetary decisions without consulting her. She finally takes her own stand by leaving him. Iris's sister Gloria dies by suicide after her fiance rejects her when he finds out she is a prostitute, a label she cannot escape. Iris's other sister Mavis represents the theme of social stigmas. She chastises Gloria's prostitution and black fiance, and does not see how anyone has a different mindset than her own. Another theme in the play is the frailty of the human race. The characters all have personal flaws. Gloria cannot face the challenge of coming to terms with her life choices while Alton fails to look past her flaws. Iris and Sidney are unable to see what they have until tragedy strikes. Throughout the play these intrinsic flaws represent the imperfection of people.

== Awards and nominations ==
=== Original Broadway production ===
Year	Award	Category	Nominee	Result
1965	Tony Awards	Best Featured Actress in a Play	Alice Ghostley	Won

=== 1972 Broadway revival ===
Year	Award	Category	Nominee	Result
1972	Tony Awards	Best Featured Actress in a Play	Frances Sternhagen	Nominated

=== 2023 Broadway revival ===
Year	Award	Category	Nominee	Result
2023	Tony Awards	Best Revival of a Play		Nominated
2023	Tony Awards	Best Featured Actress in a Play	Miriam Silverman	Won
2023	Drama Desk Award	Outstanding Featured Performance in a Play	Miriam Silverman	Won
2023	Drama League Awards	Outstanding Revival of a Play		Nominated
2023	Drama League Awards	Distinguished Performance Award	Oscar Isaac	Nominated
2023	Drama League Awards	Distinguished Performance Award	Rachel Brosnahan	Nominated
2023	Drama League Awards	Outstanding Direction of a Play	Anne Kauffman	Won
