= The Atlantic City Story =

2020 film directed by Henry Butash

- Directed by: Henry Butash
- Written by: Henry Butash
- Produced by: Henry Butash; Javier Gonzalez; Christian Sosa
- Starring: Jessica Hecht; Mike Faist; Nina Hellman; Gary Wilmes; Prema Cruz; Emily Donahoe
- Cinematography: Justin Derry
- Edited by: Luke Pinion
- Release date: October 23, 2020; (Denver Film Festival)
- Running time: 98 minutes
- Country: United States
- Language: English

The Atlantic City Story is a 2020 drama film directed by Henry Butash. It premiered at the 2020 Denver Film Festival.

== Synopsis ==
After experiencing problems in her marriage, Jane runs away from home to Atlantic City for the weekend, where she meets a young gambler, Arthur.

== Cast ==
- Jessica Hecht - Jane
- Mike Faist - Arthur
- Gary Wilmes - Gary

== Reception ==
In his review in The Film Stage, Christian Gallichio rated it an "A-" saying that "by limiting the narrative and thematic scope, never looking beyond the lives of these two fully-formed characters, Butash's film is a compact marvel." Writing for Hey U Guys, Jack Hawkins rated it 2 out of 5 stars saying that the film "never quite comes together, neither as a romance nor as a statement on the human condition. There’s some crescendo between the lovers, but there’s no peak."

At Eye for Film, Jennie Kermode rated it 4 out of 5 stars saying that "it's not hard o guess the overall arc of the film, one never feels certain of how any one scene will go." At High On Films, Shikhar Verma rated it 2.5 out of 5 stars saying that "is a film that understands the underrated feeling of being lost. It understands the reason why so many people in the world don't share or confide their sadness with the people they know."
