= Belleville (play) =

2011 play by Amy Herzog

Belleville is a play from American playwright Amy Herzog. Commissioned by Yale Repertory Theatre, the play premiered at the company in October 2011. It has been produced extensively across the US and UK, and Anne Kaufmann directed the production in its 2013 off-Broadway debut. The off-Broadway production was a New York Times Critics' Pick, with Charles Isherwood of the Times describing the play as "extraordinarily fine." Kaufmann received a nod for the Lucille Lortel Award for Outstanding Director, while Ben Stanton was nominated for Outstanding Lighting Design. The play also received a 2013 Drama Desk Award nomination for Outstanding Play, while Maria Dizzia was nominated for Outstanding Actress in a Play for her portrayal of Abby.

== Plot ==
The play follows a young American ex-pat couple living in the up-and-coming Belleville neighbourhood of Paris. Abby is an actor-turned-yoga-instructor, while Zack is doing AIDS research with Doctors Without Borders, but their life abroad is filled with conflict. Belleville examines a marriage fraying at the seams and coming undone with unflinching honesty and truth.

== Canadian production ==
The Company Theatre (TCT) brought Herzog's play to Toronto's Berkeley Street Theatre in 2014 in association with Canadian Stage. Helmed by regular TCT collaborator and director Jason Byrne, the show starred TCT co-Artistic Director Allan Hawko in the role of Zack, with Christine Horne returning to TCT to take on the role of Abby. Rounding out the cast as Abby and Zack's Senegalese landlords, Alioune and Amina, are Dalmar Abuzeid and Marsha Regis in their TCT debuts.

Belleville marked Hawko's first return to the theatre since 2009, when he trod the boards in TCT's production of Festen.

The creative team included both new and returning TCT collaborators. Yannik Larivée designed the production's costumes and set, while Kevin Lamotte joined the team as the lighting designer. Richard Feren, the sound designer from TCT's production of The Test (2011), took on both sound design and musical composition, while stage manager Michael Sinclair returned for his second stint with the company.
