= David Adjmi =

American playwright

- Born: 1973 (age 52–53); New York City, New York, U.S.
- Education: Sarah Lawrence College (BA); University of Iowa (MFA); Juilliard School (GrDip)
- Occupation: Playwright

David Adjmi (born 1973) is an American playwright. He is the recipient of a Tony Award, a Drama Desk Award, a New York Drama Critics' Circle Award, an Outer Critics Circle Award, a Guggenheim Fellowship, a Whiting Award, the inaugural Steinberg Playwright Award, a Bush Artists Fellowship, and the Kesselring Prize for Drama. In 2020, he released a memoir about the struggle to become an artist, titled Lot Six. His plays include Stunning (2008) and Stereophonic (2023), the latter winning the Tony Award for Best Play.

== Life ==
Adjmi grew up in a Syrian Jewish family in Midwood, Brooklyn. He is a graduate of Sarah Lawrence College (1995), the Playwrights Workshop at the University of Iowa (MFA 2001), and the Juilliard School's American Playwrights Program (2003). As of 2026, he resides in London, England.

== Career ==
Adjmi's play The Evildoers was developed at the Sundance Institute and the Royal Court Theatre in London. It premiered in January 2008 at the Yale Repertory Theatre. Variety called it "an anxiety attack of a play" and, of Adjmi, noted that he is "clearly a writer with a distinct voice, ambition and style." His play Stunning opened a month later at Woolly Mammoth Theatre Company in Washington DC where it was selected as one of the top ten plays of the year by The Washington Post and was published in American Theatre magazine. Stunning premiered in New York at Lincoln Center Theater in June 2009 where it played an extended run to sold-out houses. Adjmi's play Marie Antoinette was developed at the Goodman Theatre's New Stages Series and the Sundance Institute's Residency at the Public Theatre. It will premiere in a coproduction between the American Repertory Theater and Yale Repertory Theatre in Fall 2012. His play 3C premieres at Rattlestick Playwrights Theatre in June 2012. His monologue Elective Affinities was commissioned by the Royal Court Theatre and later premiered at the Royal Shakespeare Company in the United Kingdom. In November 2011 it received its U.S. Premiere at Soho Repertory Theatre, featuring Tony Award-winning actress Zoe Caldwell, and directed by OBIE winner Sarah Benson. His play Marie Antoinette, which was presented at Yale Rep. in 2012 and received three Connecticut Critics Circle Awards including Best Play, opened the 2013–2014 season at Soho Rep. under the direction of Rebecca Taichman and with many members of the original cast. The New Yorker named Adjmi as one of the Top Ten in Culture for 2011, and described him as an artist who is part of "a new trend in the American theatre."

Other plays include Strange Attractors, Caligula and the controversial hit 3C which put Adjmi in the center of a media firestorm and a legal battle with DLT Entertainment, the rights holders of the television series Three's Company which Adjmi satirized in his play. DLT issued a Cease and Desist to the playwright on Adjmi's opening night. In 2014, Adjmi sued for a declaratory judgment that he had not infringed DLT's copyright. On March 31, 2015, three years after its premiere, United States District Judge Loretta Preska ruled in a 56-page decision that the play deconstructed rather than repeated the sitcom, turning it into “a nightmarish version of itself” and was protected as a fair use. 3C made Year's Best lists in Time Out New York, the New York Post and The Advocate.

Adjmi is the recipient of numerous awards for his work, including the Helen Merrill Award, the Marian Seldes-Garson Kanin Fellowship, and McKnight and Jerome Fellowships from The Playwrights' Center. A collection of his work, Stunning and Other Plays, was published by Theatre Communications Group in 2011, and a second collection, 1789/1978, was published in October 2017. Adjmi is currently at work on The Stumble, a commission for Lincoln Center Theatre.

Adjmi's play Stereophonic, a co-commission for Second Stage Theatre and Center Theater Group, had its world premiere at Playwrights Horizons in 2023. On January 17, 2024, it was announced that Stereophonic would transfer to the John Golden Theatre for a limited run on Broadway, marking Adjmi's Broadway debut. Previews began on April 3, 2024, with opening night on April 19. The production received acclaim from critics, earning 13 nominations and 5 wins at the 77th Tony Awards, including Best Play. Stereophonic holds the record for the most Tony nominations by a play, surpassing the record previously held by Slave Play.

== Works ==
- 2003: Strange Attractors (Empty Space Theatre, Seattle)
- 2005: Elective Affinities (Royal Court Theatre, London, RSC/Stratford)
- 2008: Caligula (Soho Rep Studio Series)
- 2008: The Evildoers (Yale Rep)
- 2008: Stunning (Woolly Mammoth Theatre Company, DC)
- 2009: Stunning (Lincoln Center Theater)
- 2011: Elective Affinities (Soho Repertory Theatre, NY)
- 2012: 3C (Rattlestick Playwrights Theater)
- 2012: Marie Antoinette (American Repertory Theatre/Yale Repertory Theatre)
- 2013: Marie Antoinette (Soho Repertory Theatre, NY)
- 2015: Marie Antoinette (Steppenwolf Theatre Company, Chicago)
- 2018: The Stumble (Lincoln Center Theater, NY)
- 2018: Stereophonic (Sundance Theatre Lab, Mass Moca, North Adams, MA)
- 2019: The Blind King (Sundance Theatre Lab, Sundance, UT)
- 2023: Stereophonic (Playwrights Horizons, NY)
- 2024: Stereophonic (John Golden Theatre, NY)
