= Amy Herzog =

American playwright

- Born: New Brunswick, New Jersey, U.S.
- Occupation: Playwright
- Education: Yale University (BA, MFA)
- Notable works: 4000 Miles; Mary Jane
- Notable awards: New York Drama Critics' Circle Award, Best Play 2017 Mary Jane; Drama Desk Award, Outstanding Adaptation 2023 A Doll's House; Drama Desk Award, Outstanding Adaptation 2024 An Enemy of the People
- Spouse: Sam Gold

Amy Herzog is an American playwright. Her plays are character-driven and focus on relationships and the human experience. She has received a Drama Desk Award as well as a nomination for a Tony Award.

Her play 4000 Miles, which ran Off-Broadway in 2011, was a finalist for the 2013 Pulitzer Prize for Drama. Her play Mary Jane, which ran Off-Broadway in 2017, won the New York Drama Critics' Circle Award for Best Play and was nominated for the Tony Award for Best Play. Herzog adapted revivals of the Henrik Ibsen plays A Doll's House (2023) and An Enemy of the People (2024), both of which earned her Tony Award for Best Revival of a Play nominations and wins for the Drama Desk Award for Outstanding Adaptation.

== Early life and career ==
Herzog's grandfather is songwriter Arthur Herzog Jr. She grew up in Highland Park, New Jersey and was the valedictorian of her 1996 graduating class at Highland Park High School.

Herzog received a Bachelor's degree from Yale College and a Masters in Fine Arts from the Yale School of Drama. Her teachers included Richard Nelson and John Guare. Jim Nicola, producer of Belleville at the New York Theatre Workshop, said that "the distinction of Herzog's work is her belief 'that private, individual experience is always inseparable from public, historical processes, when she explores human lives.'" Herzog teaches at Yale as a lecturer in Playwriting.

== Career ==
=== 2010–2016: Early work ===
Her play After the Revolution had its world premiere at the Williamstown Theatre Festival, Massachusetts, from July 22 to August 1, 2010. The play premiered Off-Broadway at Playwrights Horizons in October 2010 (in previews) and ran through December 12, 2010. The play concerns the young granddaughter continuing her "family's Marxist tradition, devoting her life to the memory of her blacklisted grandfather." The play was directed by Carolyn Cantor and the cast featured Mare Winningham, Lois Smith (as Vera), Peter Friedman and Katharine Powell. The play received nominations for the Lucille Lortel Award for Outstanding Actor and Actress, as well as the Outer Critics Circle Award, John Glassner award. Charles Isherwood, in his review for The New York Times called the play "smart, engrossing", and wrote: it "strikes a fresh note in being set among a family of exotic beings". Herzog won the "New York Times Outstanding Playwright Award" for this play; the award carries a prize of $5000.

Her play The Great God Pan opened at Playwrights Horizons in December 2012 and closed on January 13, 2013. Directed by Carolyn Cantor, the cast featured Becky Ann Baker, Peter Friedman, Jeremy Strong (Jamie), Keith Nobbs (Frank) and Joyce Van Patten. The play concerns a journalist, Jamie, age 32. Jamie is told by his old friend Frank that Frank is suing his own father for sexual abuse; Frank suspects that Jamie was also abused. Although Jamie denies this, his life and relationships are thrown into turmoil. Herzog said that the play is "not about abuse, it's about memory and self-discovery." Charles Isherwood, reviewing in The New York Times, wrote: Herzog "has emerged in the past few years as one of the bright theatrical lights of her generation. ... She writes with a keen sensitivity to the complex weave of feelings embedded in all human relationships, with particular attention to the way we tiptoe around areas of radioactive emotion. Ms. Herzog makes quietly captivating dramas of our instinct to avoid drama, noting how momentous events in our lives can pass by almost without registering on the surface." The play received a 2013 Drama Desk Award nomination for Outstanding Featured Actor in a Play (Peter Friedman).

Belleville had its world premiere at the Yale Repertory Theatre in October through November 2011, directed by Anne Kauffman. This play was commissioned by Yale Rep. The play then opened Off-Broadway at the New York Theatre Workshop from March 3, 2013, to April 14, 2013. Again directed by Anne Kauffman, the cast featured Maria Dizzia and Greg Keller. Belleville opened in London at the Donmar Warehouse on December 14, 2017. Directed by Michael Longhurst, the cast featured James Norton and Imogen Poots.

The play involves two young married Americans, Zack and Abby, living in Paris in a "funky bohemian apartment in up-and-coming Belleville". Zack's "noble mission [is] to fight pediatric AIDS." The play received nominations for the Lucille Lortel Award for Outstanding Director (Anne Kauffman) and Outstanding Lighting Design (Ben Stanton). The play also received 2013 Drama Desk Award nominations for Outstanding Play and Outstanding Actress in a Play (Maria Dizzia). Herzog, for Belleville, was a finalist for the 2013 Susan Smith Blackburn Prize.

=== 2017–present: Mary Jane and adaptations ===
Her play Mary Jane premiered at Yale Repertory Theatre, New Haven, Connecticut, from April 28 to May 20, 2017, directed by Anne Kauffman. Mary Jane was a finalist for the 2017 Susan Smith Blackburn Prize. The Yale Rep production featured Emily Donahoe (Mary Jane) and Kathleen Chalfant (Ruthie, Tenkei). Mary Jane opened Off-Broadway at the New York Theatre Workshop on September 6, 2017 (previews) and closed on October 29, 2017. The Off-Broadway production, directed by Anne Kauffman, featured Carrie Coon (Mary Jane), Brenda Wehle (Ruthie, Tenkei), and Liza Colón-Zayas. Mary Jane focuses on a single mother (Mary Jane) who is raising an ill child, helped by female friends. The Off-Broadway cast was new, and director Kaufman had "the chance to reexamine it from a new angle."

Mary Jane won the New York Drama Critics' Circle Award for Best Play on May 3, 2018. The play received six 2018 Lucille Lortel Awards nominations: Outstanding Director (Anne Kauffman), Outstanding Lead Actress in a Play (Carrie Coon), Outstanding Featured Actress in a Play (Liza Colón-Zayas), Outstanding Scenic Design (Laura Jellinek), Outstanding Lighting Design (Japhy Weideman) and Outstanding Sound Design (Leah Gelpe). The play received two 2018 Drama Desk Award nominations: Outstanding Play and Outstanding Actress in a Play (Carrie Coon).

Herzog adapted a new version of Henrik Ibsen's A Doll's House directed by Jamie Lloyd. It played in 2023 at the Hudson Theatre, starring Jessica Chastain. Her adaptation of Ibsen's An Enemy of the People opened on Broadway, March 18, 2024, directed by her husband, Sam Gold.

== Style and themes ==
Tim Sanford, former artistic director of Playwrights Horizons, noted that Herzog is willing "to take on 'ideas and history, which not everyone believes in anymore.' He also praises the sophistication of her structures and characters. 'You can see the affinity for Richard Nelson, who was her teacher,' Sanford points out, referring to the veteran playwright and teacher at Yale School of Drama."

Richard Nelson said: "She has great, great facility for dialogue ... It's clean, it's simple, it's evocative, it's witty. It's alive and easily spoken. Very, very actable. That's a given talent." John Guare noted "Amy came fully formed" Guare also mentioned her "warm-hearted, cold-eyed sympathy for her characters."

Herzog based several characters in her plays on family members. The character of Vera Joseph in 4000 Miles is based on Herzog's grandmother, Leepee. Vera initially appeared in her play After the Revolution. Leo in 4000 Miles is based on her cousin who lost a good friend. The "Josephs" in her plays are also partially based on her father's stepfamily.

== Personal life ==
She is married to stage director Sam Gold. Although Herzog and Gold had two children, their eldest daughter Frances was born with nemaline myopathy and died at age 11 in 2023. Herzog's semi-autobiographical play Mary Jane is based on a mother's struggle in caring for a medically-compromised child and the community she gathers in support of her challenges.

== Stage credits ==
| Year | Title | Role | Venue | Ref. |
|---|---|---|---|---|
| 2010 | After the Revolution | Playwright | Williamstown Theatre Festival; Playwrights Horizons | |
| 2011 | 4000 Miles | Playwright | Mitzi E. Newhouse Theatre at Lincoln Center | |
| 2011, 2013 | Belleville | Playwright | Yale Repertory Theatre; New York Theatre Workshop | |
| 2012 | The Great God Pan | Playwright | Playwrights Horizons | |
| 2017, 2024 | Mary Jane | Playwright | Yale Repertory Theatre; New York Theatre Workshop; Samuel J. Friedman Theatre (Broadway) | |
| 2023 | A Doll's House | Adaptation | Hudson Theatre | |
| 2024 | An Enemy of the People | Adaptation | Circle in the Square Theatre | |

== Awards and honors ==
| Year | Association | Category | Project | Result | Ref. |
|---|---|---|---|---|---|
| 2013 | Pulitzer Prize | Drama | 4000 Miles | Finalist | |
| 2018 | New York Drama Critics' Circle Award | Best Play | Mary Jane | Won | |
| 2018 | Obie Award | Playwrighting | Mary Jane | Won | |
| 2018 | Drama Desk Award | Outstanding Play | Mary Jane | Nominated | |
| 2023 | Tony Award | Best Revival of a Play | A Doll's House | Nominated | |
| 2023 | Drama Desk Award | Outstanding Adaptation | A Doll's House | Won | |
| 2024 | Drama Desk Award | Outstanding Adaptation | An Enemy of the People | Won | |
| 2024 | Tony Award | Best Revival of a Play | An Enemy of the People | Nominated | |
| 2024 | Tony Award | Best Play | Mary Jane | Nominated | |

Herzog's plays have been produced Off-Broadway, and have received nominations for, among others: the Lucille Lortel Award for Outstanding Actor and Actress (After the Revolution); the Drama Desk Award nomination for Outstanding Featured Actor in a Play (The Great God Pan); and Drama Desk Award nominations for Outstanding Play and Outstanding Actress in a Play (Belleville). She was a finalist for the 2012–2013 and 2016–2017 Susan Smith Blackburn Prize.

She received the 2008 Helen Merrill Award for Aspiring Playwrights. She won a 2011 Whiting Award, which included a $50,000 prize. She received the Lilly Award in 2011 for playwrighting. (The Lilly Award Foundation has as its mission to "celebrate the work of women in the theater and promote gender parity at all levels of theatrical production.") Herzog won the 2012 Obie Award in the category Best New American Play for 4000 Miles. She was a finalist for the 2012-2013 Susan Smith Blackburn Award for Belleville; each finalist receives $2,500.

She was a finalist for the 2016-2017 Susan Smith Blackburn Award for her play Mary Jane. Each finalist receives $5,000. She won the New York Drama Critics' Circle Award for Best Play for Mary Jane in 2018. The award includes a cash prize of $2,500. Herzog was awarded the 2019 Horton Foote Playwriting Award (along with Heidi Schreck) by the Dramatists Guild of America. The award, to be presented at a ceremony in July 2019, has a cash prize of $12,500. Herzog's adaptation of Ibsen's A Doll's House earned her a Tony Award for Best Revival of a Play nomination. This adaptation was the first time a woman (Herzog) adapted A Doll's House for Broadway.
