= Andrea Thome =

Chilean and Costa Rican playwright

Andrea Thome is a Chilean and Costa Rican playwright born in Madison, Wisconsin. Her plays have been performed at venues all over the United States, and she is founder and co-director of the Fulana media project.

== Biography ==
Andrea Thome's mother is from Chile and her father is from Costa Rica and the United States. She considers herself Pan-American and believes that this permeates into her writing. Thome also found inspiration from the works of fellow Chilean writer Gabriela Mistral, the first Nobel Prize winner from Chile. Thome obtained her Bachelor’s from Harvard University in Literature and Drama & History in the Americas. She went on to the NYU Tisch School of the Arts to earn her Masters in Dramatic Writing.

== Career ==
Thome is known in the United States and Latin America for her plays and translations. Thome spent five years at Red River Theater in San Francisco, where she co-created 22 pieces. She has translated works by Richard Viqueira (H), and Ximena Escalante (Real Andromeda).

Pinkolandia is one of Thome's better known plays. It follows the story of a family that recently arrived to the US escaping the dictatorship in Chile. The play also discusses how children make sense of the world around them as interpreted in their imaginary "closetlandia." The play touches on themes of leaving home and having to reconcile leaving things behind. Thome discussed in an interview with Two River Theater how it has touched people of different backgrounds, including those who are not children of immigrants but have been politically involved. Thome began writing Pinkolandia as part of the Hispanic Playwrights and Residence Lab at INTAR Theatre in New York. It was chosen for the 2012 Crossing Borders Festival at the Two River Theater and will premiere at the Salvage Vanguard Theater in Austin and 16th Street Theater in Chicago.

In 2000, Thome founded Fulana alongside three other Latina artists. Fulana is a media collective project that explores issues relevant to Latinos in the United States "using parody and satire as a critical tool." Pieces produced by the collective include mock commercials, music videos, and action pieces. In 2009, Fulana received the Ford Foundation/Hemispheric Institute Transnational Arts Initiative Grant as well as recognition from NALAC Fund for the Arts.

Thome has received fellowships from New York Film Academy, New York City, the City of Oakland, Lark Play Development Center, INTAR, New York University and the Women’s Project. She is currently serving as program director for the U.S.-Mexico Playwrights Exchange at the Lark Play Development Center. She received the Lark Play Center fellowship in 2011 to develop her latest work, The Necklace of a Dove, which is a multidisciplinary musical work. She still serves as Co-director of Fulana.

== Plays ==
- Worm Girl - First presented by the Source Theater in Washington DC in 2004
- Menomonee Falls to St. Cloud - First presented by the INTAR Theater in New York, NY in May 2008
- Global Cooling: The Women Chill - First presented by the Women’s Project Theater in New York, NY in 2008
- Undone - First presented at Queens College in New York, NY in Spring 2012
- Dream Acts - First presented by the HERE Arts Center Dorothy B Williams Theater New York, NY in 2012
- Pinkolandia - First presented by the INTAR Theater in New York, NY in May 2013
- Neva - First presented by the Public Theater in New York, NY in March 2013
