= Mary Louise Wilson =

American actress (b. 1931)

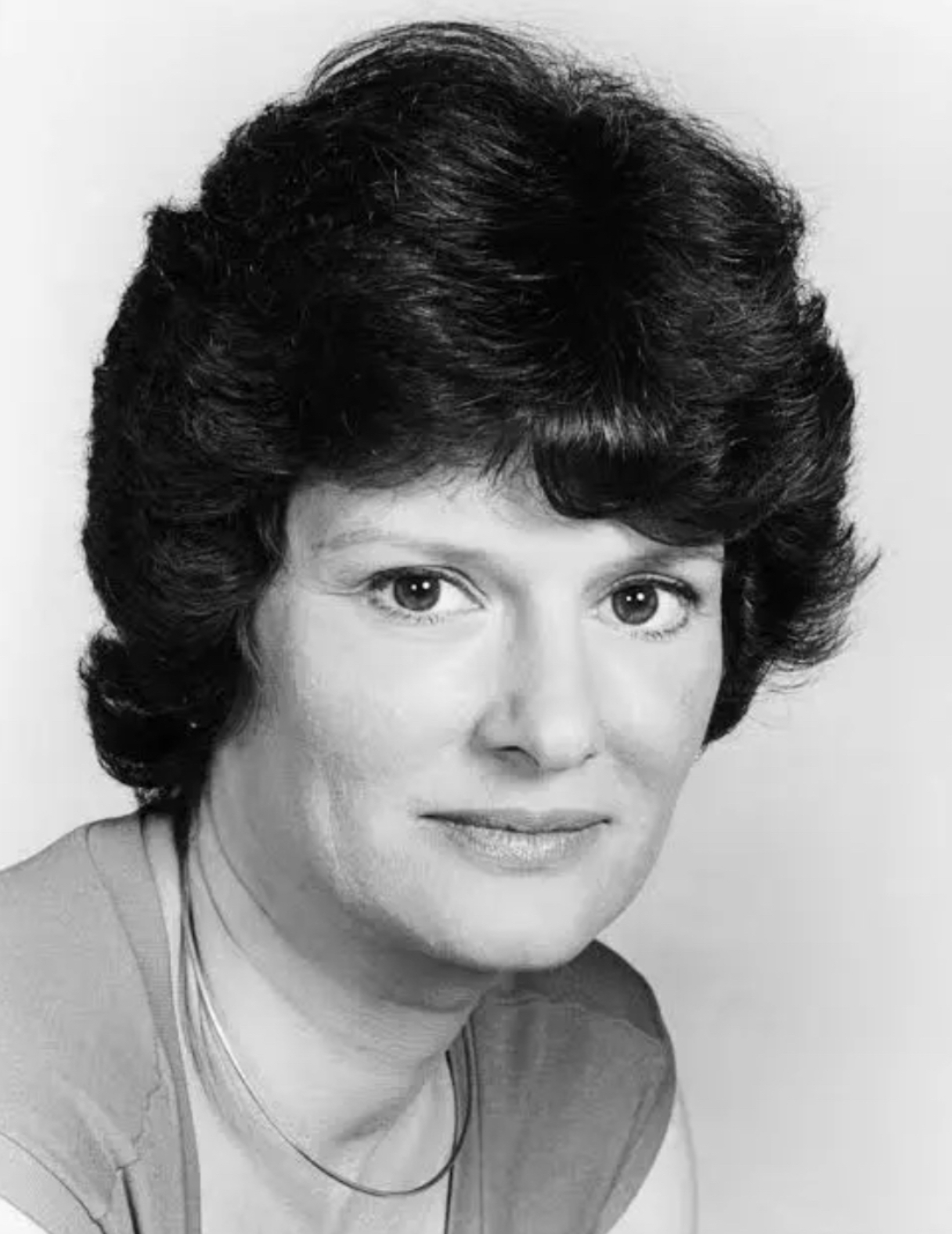
- Wilson in One Day at a Time, 1976
- Born: November 12, 1931 (age 94); New Haven, Connecticut, U.S.
- Occupations: Actress, singer
- Years active: 1958–present
- Spouse: Alfred Cibelli (m. 1965; div. 1968)

Mary Louise Wilson (born November 12, 1931) is an American actress, singer, and comedian, known for her role in Grey Gardens. She is also known for her appearances on One Day at a Time.

== Early life ==
Wilson was born in New Haven, Connecticut, but raised in New Orleans, Louisiana.

== Work ==
=== Filmography ===
Year	Title	Role(s)	Notes
1971	Klute	an ad agency secretary	
1971	Going Home	Mrs. Green the real estate lady	
1972	Up the Sandbox	Betty	
1978	King of the Gypsies	Ivy	
1982	The Best Little Whorehouse in Texas	Miss Mo-dene	
1983	Zelig	Ruth, Zelig's half-sister	
1984	Teachers	Teacher	
1986	The Money Pit	Benny's mom	
1989	Cheap Shots	Dotty	
1989	Pet Sematary	Dory Goldman	
1989	She-Devil	Mrs. Trumper	
1990	Everybody Wins	Jean	
1990	Green Card	Mrs. Sheehan	
1993	The Adventures of Huck Finn	Miss Watson	
1993	Mr. Wonderful	Muriel Manners	
1998	Stepmom	Mrs. Franklin	
1999	24 Nights	Lillian	
2002	Searching for Paradise	Evelyn Greenslate	
2003	The Third Date	Lulu	Short film
2003	Psychoanalysis Changed My Life	Dr. Anya Zurmer	
2013	Nebraska	Aunt Martha	
2018	Ocean's 8	Marlene	

=== Television ===
- The Royal Family (1977) as Kitty Dean
- One Day at a Time (1976-1977) as Ginny Wroblicki
- Maude (1978) as Congresswoman Irene McIlhenny
- Lou Grant (1982)
- A Mistaken Charity (1986) as Mrs. Simmonds
- Tales from the Darkside (1986)
- The Thorns (1988)
- Blind Spot (1993) as Mrs. Deitz
- Remember WENN (1996)
- Cosby (1999)
- Frasier (2000) as Helen
- The Sopranos (2000) as Catherine Romano
- A Season for Miracles (1999) as Corinna
- The Women (2002) as Mrs. Morehead
- Louie (2010) as Louie's mother
- Nurse Jackie (2012) as Doris
- Mozart in the Jungle (2014-2018) as Bunny
- Orange is the New Black (2016) as Millie
- Modern Family (2018) as Becky Pritchett
- ‘’Tales of the City’’ (2019) as Doris

=== Stage ===
Broadway

- Hot Spot (1963) as Sue Ann (Broadway debut)
- Flora the Red Menace (1965) as Comrade Ada
- Lovers and Other Strangers (1968) as Bernice
- Noël Coward's Sweet Potato (1968) (replacement)
- Promises, Promises (1968) as Marge MacDougall
- Watercolor & Criss-Crossing (1970)
- The Women (1973) as Nancy Blake
- Gypsy: A Musical Fable (1974) as Tessie Tura
- The Royal Family (1975) as Kitty Dean
- The Importance of Being Earnest (1977) as Miss Prism
- The Philadelphia Story (1980) as Elizabeth Imbrie
- Fools (1981) as Lenya Zubritsky
- Alice in Wonderland (1982) as the Red Queen
- The Odd Couple (1985) as Mickey
- Cabaret (1998) as Fräulein Schneider
- The Women (2001) as Mrs. Morehead
- Grey Gardens (2006) as Edith Bouvier Beale (Tony Award)
- On the Twentieth Century (2015) as Letita Peabody Primrose

Off-Broadway

- Bonds of Interest (1958)
- The Threepenny Opera (1959) (replacement)
- Dime a Dozen (1962)
- A Great Career (1968)
- Whispers on the Wind (1970)
- Sister Mary Ignatius Explains It All for You and The Actor's Nightmare (1982) (replacement)
- Baby with the Bathwater (1983)
- Macbeth (1989)
- Flaubert's Latest (1992)
- Full Gallop (1995) (co-author, winner of the Drama Desk Award for Outstanding One-Person Show)
- Bosoms and Neglect (1998)
- The Beard of Avon (2004)
- Grey Gardens (2006)
- 4000 Miles (2011)

Other

- Gypsy (1974)
- Anyone Can Whistle (1980)
- Social Security (1987)
- False Admissions (1994)
- The Milk Train Doesn't Stop Here Anymore (1996)
- Morning's at Seven (2002)
- The Rivals (2005)
- The Guardsman (2010)

== Awards and nominations ==
Year	Award	Category	Nominated Work	Result
1996	Obie Award	Distinguished Performance by an Actress	Full Gallop	Won
1998	Tony Award	Best Performance by a Featured Actress in a Musical	Cabaret	Nominated
1999	Drama Desk Award	Outstanding Featured Actress in a Play	Bosoms and Neglect	Nominated
2004	Drama Desk Award	Outstanding Featured Actress in a Play	The Beard of Avon	Nominated
2006	Outer Critics Circle Award	Outstanding Featured Actress in a Musical	Grey Gardens	Nominated
2006	Lucille Lortel Award	Outstanding Performance by a Featured Actress	Grey Gardens	Nominated
2006	Drama League Award	Distinguished Performance	Grey Gardens	Nominated
2007	Tony Award	Best Performance by a Featured Actress in a Musical	Grey Gardens	Won
2007	Richard Seff Award	Best Performance by an Actress in a Supporting Role in a Broadway or Off-Broadway Production	Grey Gardens	Won
2012	Obie Award	Distinguished Performance by an Actress	4000 Miles	Won
2012	Drama League Award	Distinguished Performance	4000 Miles	Nominated
2015	Outer Critics Circle Award	Outstanding Featured Actress in a Musical	On the Twentieth Century	Nominated
