= Cornerstone Theater Company =

Non-profit organization in the US

- Formation: 1986
- Type: Theatre group
- Location: Los Angeles
- Artistic director: Sunder Ganglani
- Website: https://cornerstonetheater.org

Cornerstone Theater Company is a theater company based in the United States that specializes in community-based collaboration. According to the mission statement published on the company's website,

"Cornerstone Theater Company is a multi-ethnic, ensemble-based theater company. We commission and produce new plays, both original works and contemporary adaptations of classics, which combine the artistry of professional and community collaborators. By making theater with and for people of many ages, cultures and levels of theatrical experience, Cornerstone builds bridges between and within diverse communities in our home city of Los Angeles and nationwide."

Typically, Cornerstone artists take up residence in the community they will be working with to develop a script for production. Using members of the community, Cornerstone creates a performance company, mixing the professional Cornerstone ensemble with local talent. The resulting plays are often adaptations of classics, but they are informed by and attempt to address local concerns. These plays are often organized into "Cycles" which include several related communities. For example, Cornerstone's Faith Based cycles included plays created with members of the Jewish community, Catholics, Muslims, and so on.

This artistic strategy is specifically aimed at developing and serving new audiences, and yields a collaborative theater form that blends professional actors, playwrights and stage designers with artists and actors who are in some way telling their own stories, or the stories of their community.

== Origins ==
Cornerstone was founded by director Bill Rauch and playwright Alison Carey in 1986. The impulse behind the group, according to Carey, was to create theater for audiences that they otherwise would never come in contact with.

Gathering a group of theater artists they had worked with while students at Harvard University, Rauch, Carey and their fellow artists picked a destination for their theatrical experiment that none of them had ever visited before: Marmarth, North Dakota. There they performed the Old West Shakespearean adaptation Marmarth Hamlet. For the next five years they traveled to small towns in America, including Port Gibson, Mississippi; Norcatur, Kansas; Dinwiddie, Virginia; and many others, creating theater with the local inhabitants.

== Los Angeles ==
In 1992 the company decided to settle in a city that would allow them access to a wider variety of communities to collaborate with. Since then, the company has expanded its definition of "community". Initially only defined geographically, the company's collaborations have incorporated religious communities, workplace communities, and age-based communities. For the company's 10th anniversary in 1996, the "community" was defined as "people whose birth date is the same as that of the company".

While the company normally spends weeks to months preparing for performances, the idea of "rapid response theater" had been suggested since the 1992 Los Angeles riots, which occurred shortly after the troupe's relocation to the city. In April 2006, Michael John Garcés replaced Bill Rauch as artistic director. Rauch moved to the Oregon Shakespeare Festival. On June 14 of the same year, Garcés put the "rapid response theater" concept into action with staged readings from John Steinbeck's Grapes of Wrath in protest of the eviction of the South Central Farmers from a privately held plot of land that had been used as a community garden.

Starting in the Spring of 2007, Cornerstone began a new cycle of plays concerning the topic of Justice. 2007's Los Illegals concerned the presence of undocumented workers in America, and 2008's Someday focused on reproductive rights in an era when technology makes new interventions and treatments possible. The Justice Cycle will continue through 2009 with three more productions.

In 2018, Cornerstone Theater let go of its space in the downtown Los Angeles Arts District. “We will be carefully considering what and where we want our next physical home to be—what makes sense for a unique organization like ours?” Garcés and Wanlass said in a statement.

== Bridge shows ==
Another unique facet of Cornerstone is the production of the "Bridge show", a production which links two or more communities together by combining their members into a new show that then performs in each of those communities.

At the end of the company's initial rural residencies, Cornerstone and its community partners produced The Winter's Tale: An Interstate Adventure. This musical adaptation of Shakespeare with a cast and crew of 50 from all 12 previous residency communities toured 10,000 miles, culminating Cornerstone's national touring phase.

== Cornerstone Institute ==
Cornerstone Theater Company also operates the educational Cornerstone Institute, which offers theater artists hands-on training in community-based theater. Programs offered include a summer residency, a two-day intensive course, and a semester-long traveling program mentored by Cornerstone staffers.
