= Yale Repertory Theatre =

Theater in Connecticut

Coordinates: 41°18′29.74″N 72°55′53.5″W

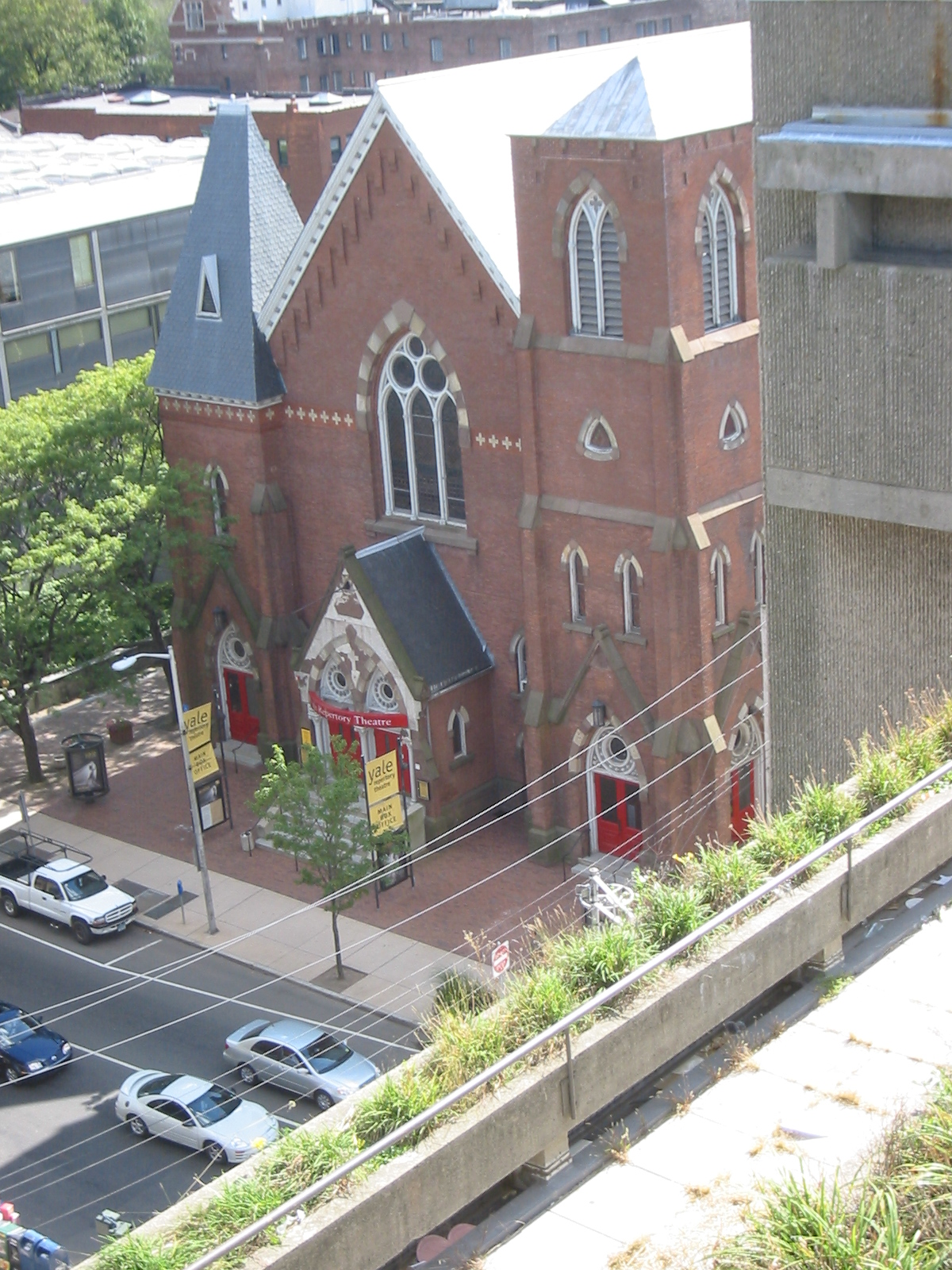
- The Yale Repertory Theatre, viewed from the Architecture Dept.
- Interactive map of Yale Repertory Theatre
- Address: New Haven, Connecticut; United States of America
- Owner: Yale University
- Capacity: 478
- Type: Regional theatre

Construction
- Opened: 1966; 60 years ago

Website
- yalerep.org

Yale Repertory Theatre
- Interactive map of the Yale Repertory Theatre area

General information
- Architectural style: Gothic revival architecture
- Completed: 1846
- Client: The Calvary Baptist Church

Technical details
- Structural system: Brick masonry

Yale Repertory Theatre at Yale University in New Haven, Connecticut was founded by Robert Brustein, dean of Yale School of Drama, in 1966, with the goal of facilitating a meaningful collaboration between theatre professionals and talented students. In the process it has become one of the first distinguished regional theatres. Located at the edge of Yale's main downtown campus, it occupies the former Calvary Baptist Church.

== History ==
As head of Yale Repertory Theatre ("the Rep") from 1966 to 1979, Robert Brustein brought professional actors to Yale each year to form a repertory company and nurtured notable new authors including Christopher Durang. Some successful works were transferred to commercial theaters. Michael Feingold was the first literary manager.

The dean of Yale School of Drama is the artistic director of the Yale Repertory Theatre, with Lloyd Richards (who most notably nurtured the career of August Wilson) serving in this capacity 1979–1991, Stan Wojewodski, Jr., 1991–2002, and James Bundy since 2002. Benjamin Mordecai served as managing director from 1982 to 1993. Victoria Nolan was managing director from 1993 to 2020. Her successor was Florie Seery.

Of the more than 90 world premieres the Rep has produced, four have won Pulitzer Prizes; ten productions have received Tony Awards after being transferred to Broadway, and Yale Repertory Theatre was given a Drama Desk Special Award in 1988 and the Tony Award for Outstanding Regional Theatre in 1991.

In 2002, Yale School of Drama and Yale Repertory Theatre received the Governor's Arts Award from Governor John G. Rowland for artistic achievement and contribution to the arts in the state of Connecticut.

The book The Play's the Thing by James Magruder covers the history of the Rep's first fifty years.

== Calvary Baptist Church Building ==
Calvary Baptist Church was erected in 1846 in the Gothic revival architectural style on a plot of land that was the original home of Richard Platt, one of the founders of New Haven. Upon redundancy, the church was controlled by Yale University, which was already served by a nondenominational chapel.

== Production history ==
2019–2020 Season
Date	Show	Notes
October 4–26, 2019	Girls after The Bacchae by Euripides, by Branden Jacob-Jenkins	World Premiere, choreography by Raja Feather Kelly, directed by Lileana Blain-Cruz
November 29 – December 21, 2019	The Plot by Will Eno	World Premiere, directed by Oliver Butler
January 24 – February 15, 2020	Manahatta by Mary Kathryn Nagle	East Coast Premiere, directed by Laurie Woolery. First Native American written play at the theater.
March 13 – April 4, 2020	A Raisin in the Sun by Lorraine Hansberry	Directed by Carl Cofield, cancelled due to COVID-19
April 24 – May 16, 2020	Testmatch by Kate Attwell	World Premiere, directed by Margot Bordelon, cancelled due to COVID-19

2018–2019 Season
Date	Show	Notes
September 28 – October 20, 2018	El Huracán by Charise Castro Smith	World Premiere, Directed by Laurie Woolery, presented in collaboration with The Sol Project
November 2–17, 2018	The Prisoner	Text and Stage Direction by Peter Brook and Marie-Hélène Estienne
February 1–23, 2019	Good Faith by Karen Hartman	World Premiere, directed by Kenny Leon
March 15 – April 6, 2019	Twelfth Night by William Shakespeare	Directed by Carl Cofield
April 26 – May 18, 2019	Cadillac Crew by Tori Sampson	World Premiere, directed by Jesse Rasmussen and Tori Sampson

2017–2018 Season
Date	Show	Notes
October 6–28, 2017	An Enemy of the People by Henrik Ibsen, New translation by Paul Walsh	directed by James Bundy
November 24 – December 16, 2017	Native Son by Nambi E. Kelley, adapted from the novel by Richard Wright	directed by Seret Scott
January 26 – February 17, 2018	Field Guide created by Rude Mechs	world premiere
March 16 – April 7, 2018	Father Comes Home From the Wars, Parts 1, 2 & 3 by Suzan-Lori Parks	directed by Liz Diamond
April 27 – May 19, 2018	Kiss by Guillermo Calederón	directed by Evan Yionoulis

2016–2017 Season
Date	Show	Notes
September 30 – October 22, 2016	Scenes from Court Life or the whipping boy and his prince by Sarah Ruhl	world premiere, directed by Mark Wing-Davey
November 25 – December 17, 2016	Seven Guitars by August Wilson	directed by Timothy Douglas
January 20 – February 11, 2017	Imogen Says Nothing by Aditi Brennan Kapil	world premiere, directed by Laurie Woolery
March 17 – April 8, 2017	Assassins, book by John Weidman, music and lyrics by Stephen Sondheim	directed by James Bundy
April 28 – May 20, 2017	Mary Jane by Amy Herzog	world premiere, directed by Anne Kauffman

2015–2016 Season
Date	Show	Notes
October 2–24, 2015	Indecent by Paula Vogel	world premiere, created by Paula Vogel and Rebecca Taichman, directed by Rebecca Taichman
November 27 – December 19, 2015	peerless by Jiehae Park	world premiere, directed by Margot Bordelon
January 29 – February 20, 2016	The Moors by Jen Silverman	world premiere, directed by Jackson Gay
March 25 – April 16, 2016	Cymbeline by William Shakespeare	directed by Evan Yionoulis
April 29 – May 21, 2016	Happy Days by Samuel Beckett	directed by James Bundy, featuring Dianne Wiest

2014–2015 Season
Date	Show	Notes
October 3–25, 2014	Arcadia by Tom Stoppard	directed by James Bundy
November 21 – December 13, 2014	War by Branden Jacobs-Jenkins	world premiere, directed by Lileana Blain-Cruz
January 30 – February 21, 2015	Familiar by Danai Gurira	world premiere. directed by Rebecca Taichman
March 20 – April 11, 2015	The Caucasian Chalk Circle by Bertolt Brecht	directed by Liz Diamond
April 24 – May 16, 2015	Elevada by Sheila Callaghan	world premiere, directed by Jackson Gay

2013–2014 Season
Date	Show	Notes
September 20 – October 12, 2013	A Streetcar Named Desire by Tennessee Williams	directed by Mark Rucker, featuring René Augesen and Joe Manganiello
October 25 – November 16, 2013	Owners by Caryl Churchill	directed by Evan Yionoulis
November 30 – December 21, 2013	Accidental Death of an Anarchist by Dario Fo	directed by Christopher Bayes
January 31 – February 22, 2014	The Fairytale Lives of Russian Girls by Meg Miroshnik	directed by Rachel Chavkin
March 14 – April 5, 2014	These Paper Bullets adapted by Rolin Jones from William Shakespeare's Much Ado About Nothing	world premiere, songs by Billie Joe Armstrong, directed by Jackson Gay
April 18 – May 10, 2014	The House that will not Stand by Marcus Gardley	world premiere, directed by Patricia McGregor

2012–2013 Season
Date	Show	Notes
September 21 – October 13, 2012	American Night: The Ballad of Juan José by Richard Montoya	developed by Culture Clash and Jo Bonney, directed by Shana Cooper
October 26 – November 17, 2012	Marie Antoinette by David Adjmi	world premiere, directed by Rebecca Taichman
November 30 – December 22, 2012	Dear Elizabeth	world premiere by Sarah Ruhl, directed by Les Waters
January 25 – February 16, 2013	Stones in His Pockets by Marie Jones	directed by Evan Yionoulis
March 15 – April 13, 2013	Hamlet by William Shakespeare	directed by James Bundy, starring Paul Giamatti
April 26 – May 18, 2013	In a Year with 13 Moons by Rainer Werner Fassbinder	adapted by Bill Camp and Robert Woodruff, directed by Robert Woodruff

2011–2012 Season
Date	Show	Notes
September 16 – October 8, 2011	Three Sisters by Anton Chekhov	new version by Sarah Ruhl, directed by Les Waters
October 21 – November 12, 2011	Belleville by Amy Herzog	world premiere, directed by Anne Kauffman
November 25 – December 17, 2011	A Doctor In Spite of Himself by Molière	adapted by Christopher Bayes and Steven Epp
February 3–25, 2012	Good Goods by Christina Anderson	directed by Tina Landau
March 16 – April 7, 2012	The Winter's Tale by William Shakespeare	directed by Liz Diamond
April 15 – May 7, 2012	The Realistic Joneses by Will Eno	world premiere, directed by Sam Gold

2010–2011 Season
Date	Show	Notes
September 17 – October 9, 2010	We Have Always Lived in the Castle	world premiere musical, based on the 1962 novel by Shirley Jackson
October 22 – November 13, 2010	A Delicate Balance by Edward Albee	
November 26 – December 18, 2010	Bossa Nova by Kirsten Greenidge	world premiere
January 28 – February 19, 2011	The Piano Lesson by August Wilson	
March 11 – April 2, 2011	Romeo and Juliet by William Shakespeare	
April 15 – May 7, 2011	Autumn Sonata by Ingmar Bergman	US premiere, directed by Robert Woodruff

== See also ==
- Yale Dramatic Association
