= Production history of the Oregon Shakespeare Festival =

Production history of plays performed by the Oregon Shakespeare Festival, as of September 2021.

== The early years (1930s) ==
In the early years, OSF only produced works of Shakespeare.

OSF Production History: 1935–1940
Year	Play	Director	Theatre
1935	The Merchant of Venice	Angus L. Bowmer	Elizabethan Theatre
1935	Twelfth Night	Angus L. Bowmer	Elizabethan Theatre
1936	Romeo and Juliet	Angus L. Bowmer	Elizabethan Theatre
1936	The Merchant of Venice	Angus L. Bowmer	Elizabethan Theatre
1936	Twelfth Night	Angus L. Bowmer	Elizabethan Theatre
1937	Romeo and Juliet	Angus L. Bowmer	Elizabethan Theatre
1937	The Taming of the Shrew	Angus L. Bowmer	Elizabethan Theatre
1937	Twelfth Night	Angus L. Bowmer	Elizabethan Theatre
1938	Hamlet	Angus L. Bowmer	Elizabethan Theatre
1938	The Taming of the Shrew	Angus L. Bowmer	Elizabethan Theatre
1938	Twelfth Night	Angus L. Bowmer	Elizabethan Theatre
1938	The Merchant of Venice	Angus L. Bowmer	Elizabethan Theatre
1939	As You Like It	Angus L. Bowmer	Elizabethan Theatre
1939	The Taming of the Shrew	Angus L. Bowmer	Elizabethan Theatre
1939	Hamlet	Angus L. Bowmer	Elizabethan Theatre
1939	The Comedy of Errors	Angus L. Bowmer	Elizabethan Theatre
1940	As You Like It	William Cottrell	Elizabethan Theatre
1940	The Comedy of Errors	William Cottrell	Elizabethan Theatre
1940	The Merry Wives of Windsor	William Cottrell	Elizabethan Theatre
1940	Much Ado About Nothing	William Cottrell	Elizabethan Theatre

In July 1939, OSF was invited to present their production of The Taming of the Shrew at the Golden Gate International Exposition. The performance was broadcast nationally over NBC Radio. The interest drawn up by the national broadcast may have been the necessary exposure that allowed the Festival to return following World War II.

== The post-war years (late 1940s and 1950s) ==
The festival did not present any productions from 1941 to 1946. This was due to World War II and a fire that burned down the festival's original Elizabethan Theatre.

In 1951, actors from the summer acting company formed the Vining Repertory. This "edition" of the festival was created to present plays in indoor venues that allowed the season to utilize more of the year when winter weather would prohibit outdoor performances. They performed for three seasons in a local venue known as the Lithia Theatre before a fire destroyed the stage, stock, and records. The name "Vining Repertory" was in honor of the brothers who founded the Lithia Theatre and who had died just before the creation of this "sub-company".

OSF Production History: 1947–1959
Year	Play	Director	Playwright	Theatre
1947	Hamlet	Frank Lambrett-Smith	William Shakespeare	Elizabethan Theatre
1947	Love's Labour's Lost	Angus L. Bowmer	William Shakespeare	Elizabethan Theatre
1947	Macbeth	Angus L. Bowmer	William Shakespeare	Elizabethan Theatre
1947	The Merchant of Venice	Angus L. Bowmer	William Shakespeare	Elizabethan Theatre
1948	King John	Allen Fletcher	William Shakespeare	Elizabethan Theatre
1948	Love's Labor's Lost	Angus L. Bowmer	William Shakespeare	Elizabethan Theatre
1948	Othello	Angus L. Bowmer	William Shakespeare	Elizabethan Theatre
1948	The Merchant of Venice	Angus L. Bowmer	William Shakespeare	Elizabethan Theatre
1949	A Midsummer Night's Dream	James Sandoe	William Shakespeare	Elizabethan Theatre
1949	Othello	Allen Fletcher	William Shakespeare	Elizabethan Theatre
1949	Richard II	James Sandoe	William Shakespeare	Elizabethan Theatre
1949	Romeo and Juliet	Richard Graham	William Shakespeare	Elizabethan Theatre
1949	The Taming of the Shrew	Allen Fletcher	William Shakespeare	Elizabethan Theatre
1950	Antony and Cleopatra	James Sandoe	William Shakespeare	Elizabethan Theatre
1950	As You Like It	Angus L. Bowmer	William Shakespeare	Elizabethan Theatre
1950	Henry IV, Part I	Allen Fletcher	William Shakespeare	Elizabethan Theatre
1950	The Comedy of Errors	Richard Graham	William Shakespeare	Elizabethan Theatre
1951	King Lear	Angus L. Bowmer	William Shakespeare	Elizabethan Theatre
1951	Measure for Measure	James Sandoe	William Shakespeare	Elizabethan Theatre
1951	Henry IV, Part II	Philip Hanson	William Shakespeare	Elizabethan Theatre
1951	Twelfth Night	Richard Graham	William Shakespeare	Elizabethan Theatre
Fall 1951	Antigone	William Oyler	Jean Anouilh Adapted by Lewis Galantiere	Lithia Theatre Vining Repertory
Fall 1951	On Monday Next	Richard Graham	Philip King	Lithia Theatre Vining Repertory
Fall 1951	Ten Little Indians	Philip Hanson	Agatha Christie	Lithia Theatre Vining Repertory
Fall 1951	The Late Christopher Bean	H. Paul Kliss	Sidney Howard	Lithia Theatre Vining Repertory
Spring 1952	Arsenic and Old Lace	Barbara Curtis	Joseph Kesselring	Lithia Theatre Vining Repertory
Spring 1952	Claudia	Philip Hanson	Rose Franken	Lithia Theatre Vining Repertory
Spring 1952	Death of a Salesman	H. Paul Kliss	Arthur Miller	Lithia Theatre Vining Repertory
Spring 1952	The Importance of Being Earnest	Richard Graham	Oscar Wilde	Lithia Theatre Vining Repertory
1952	Henry V	Philip Hanson	William Shakespeare	Elizabethan Theatre
1952	Julius Caesar	Allen Fletcher	William Shakespeare	Elizabethan Theatre
1952	Much Ado About Nothing	Angus L. Bowmer	William Shakespeare	Elizabethan Theatre
1952	The Tempest	Richard Graham	William Shakespeare	Elizabethan Theatre
Fall 1952	Dracula	Philip Hanson	Hamilton Deane John L. Balderston	Lithia Theatre Vining Repertory
Fall 1952	The Glass Menagerie	Richard Graham	Tennessee Williams	Lithia Theatre Vining Repertory
Fall 1952	The Show-Off	John E. Taylor	George Kelly	Lithia Theatre Vining Repertory
Fall 1952	The Vinegar Tree	H. Paul Kliss	Paul Osborn	Lithia Theatre Vining Repertory
1953	Coriolanus	Allen Fletcher	William Shakespeare	Elizabethan Theatre
1953	Henry VI, Part I	James Sandoe	William Shakespeare	Elizabethan Theatre
1953	The Merchant of Venice	Richard Graham	William Shakespeare	Elizabethan Theatre
1953	The Taming of the Shrew	Philip Hanson	William Shakespeare	Elizabethan Theatre
1954	Henry VI, Part II	James Sandoe	William Shakespeare	Elizabethan Theatre
1954	Hamlet	Angus L. Bowmer	William Shakespeare	Elizabethan Theatre
1954	The Merry Wives of Windsor	Allen Fletcher	William Shakespeare	Elizabethan Theatre
1954	The Winter's Tale	H. Paul Kliss	William Shakespeare	Elizabethan Theatre
1955	A Midsummer Night's Dream	James Sandoe	William Shakespeare	Elizabethan Theatre
1955	All's Well That Ends Well	Robert B. Loper	William Shakespeare	Elizabethan Theatre
1955	Henry VI, Part III	James Sandoe	William Shakespeare	Elizabethan Theatre
1955	Macbeth	H. Paul Kliss	William Shakespeare	Elizabethan Theatre
1955	Timon of Athens	Robert B. Loper	William Shakespeare	Elizabethan Theatre
1956	Cymbeline	B. Iden Payne	William Shakespeare	Elizabethan Theatre
1956	Love's Labor's Lost	Allen Fletcher	William Shakespeare	Elizabethan Theatre
1956	Richard III	Allen Fletcher	William Shakespeare	Elizabethan Theatre
1956	Romeo and Juliet	Hal J. Todd	William Shakespeare	Elizabethan Theatre
1956	Titus Andronicus	Hal J. Todd	William Shakespeare	Elizabethan Theatre
1957	As You Like It	Angus L. Bowmer	William Shakespeare	Elizabethan Theatre
1957	Henry VIII	Robert B. Loper	William Shakespeare	Elizabethan Theatre
1957	Othello	James Sandoe	William Shakespeare	Elizabethan Theatre
1957	Pericles, Prince of Tyre	Robert B. Loper	William Shakespeare	Elizabethan Theatre
1957	The Two Gentlemen of Verona	James Sandoe	William Shakespeare	Elizabethan Theatre
1958	King Lear	Robert B. Loper	William Shakespeare	Elizabethan Theatre
1958	Much Ado About Nothing	Robert B. Loper	William Shakespeare	Elizabethan Theatre
1958	The Merchant of Venice	James Sandoe	William Shakespeare	Elizabethan Theatre
1958	Troilus and Cressida	James Sandoe	William Shakespeare	Elizabethan Theatre
1959	Antony and Cleopatra	James Sandoe	William Shakespeare	Elizabethan Theatre
1959	King John	Richard D. Risso	William Shakespeare	Elizabethan Theatre
1959	Measure for Measure	James Sandoe	William Shakespeare	Elizabethan Theatre
1959	The Maske of the New World First non-Shakespeare production in the Elizabethan Theatre	Jerry Turner	Carl Ritchie	Elizabethan Theatre
1959	Twelfth Night	Angus L. Bowmer	William Shakespeare	Elizabethan Theatre

== The 1960s ==
The 60s confirmed the demand for an indoor venue that permitted performances in colder months. Vining Rep continued for another year in a new venue: a local movie theatre called the Varsity Theatre with the dressing rooms in a trailer behind the venue. Later in the decade, the festival used the Varsity for matinee performances of Ballad Operas, but were soon able to raise enough money to build a new indoor space: The Angus Bowmer Theatre.

OSF Production History: 1960–1969
Year	Play	Director	Playwright	Theatre
1960	Julius Caesar	Jerry Turner	William Shakespeare	Elizabethan Theatre
1960	Richard II	Richard D. Risso	William Shakespeare	Elizabethan Theatre
1960	The Taming of the Shrew	Robert B. Loper	William Shakespeare	Elizabethan Theatre
1960	The Tempest	James Sandoe	William Shakespeare	Elizabethan Theatre
1960	The Tragedy of the Duchess of Malfi	James Sandoe	John Webster	Elizabethan Theatre
1961	A Midsummer Night's Dream	B. Iden Payne	William Shakespeare	Elizabethan Theatre
1961	All's Well That Ends Well	Charles G. Taylor	William Shakespeare	Elizabethan Theatre
1961	Hamlet	Robert B. Loper	William Shakespeare	Elizabethan Theatre
1961	Henry IV, Part I	Richard D. Risso	William Shakespeare	Elizabethan Theatre
1961	The Alchemist	Edward S. Brubaker	Ben Jonson	Elizabethan Theatre
Late 1961	Night of the Auk	Carl Ritchie	Arch Oboler	Varsity Theatre Vining Repertory
Late 1961	Rashomon	William Kinsolving	Michael Kanin Fay Kanin	Varsity Theatre Vining Repertory
Late 1961	The Boy Friend	William Kinsolving	Sandy Wilson	Varsity Theatre Vining Repertory
Late 1961	The Miser	Dorothy Stolp	Molière	Varsity Theatre Vining Repertory
1962	As You Like It	Jerry Turner	William Shakespeare	Elizabethan Theatre
1962	Coriolanus	J. H. Crouch	William Shakespeare	Elizabethan Theatre
1962	Henry IV, Part II	Edward S. Brubaker	William Shakespeare	Elizabethan Theatre
1962	The Comedy of Errors	Rod Alexander	William Shakespeare	Elizabethan Theatre
1962	A Thieves Ballad	Carl Ritchie	Carl Ritchie Les Carlson	Elizabethan Theatre
1963	Henry V	Jerry Turner	William Shakespeare	Elizabethan Theatre
1963	Love's Labor's Lost	Rod Alexander	William Shakespeare	Elizabethan Theatre
1963	Romeo and Juliet	Robert B. Loper	William Shakespeare	Elizabethan Theatre
1963	The Merry Wives of Windsor	Edward S. Brubaker	William Shakespeare	Elizabethan Theatre
1964	Henry VI, Part I	Jerry Turner	William Shakespeare	Elizabethan Theatre
1964	King Lear	Angus L. Bowmer	William Shakespeare	Elizabethan Theatre
1964	The Merchant of Venice	Rod Alexander	William Shakespeare	Elizabethan Theatre
1964	Twelfth Night	Robert B. Loper	William Shakespeare	Elizabethan Theatre
1964	The Knight of the Burning Pestle	Edward S. Brubaker	Francis Beaumont John Fletcher	Elizabethan Theatre
1964	Lovers Made Men	Carl Ritchie	Ben Jonson	Varsity Theatre
1965	Henry VI, Part II	Edward S. Brubaker	William Shakespeare	Elizabethan Theatre
1965	Macbeth	Richard D. Risso	William Shakespeare	Elizabethan Theatre
1965	Much Ado About Nothing	James Moll	William Shakespeare	Elizabethan Theatre
1965	The Winter's Tale	Hugh C. Evans	William Shakespeare	Elizabethan Theatre
1965	Volpone	Nagle Jackson	Ben Jonson	Elizabethan Theatre
1966	Othello	Richard D. Risso	William Shakespeare	Elizabethan Theatre
1966	A Midsummer Night's Dream	Hugh C. Evans	William Shakespeare	Elizabethan Theatre
1966	The Two Gentlemen of Verona	Nagle Jackson	William Shakespeare	Elizabethan Theatre
1966	Henry VI, Part III	Jerry Turner	William Shakespeare	Elizabethan Theatre
1966	The Beggar's Opera	Carl Ritchie	John Gay	Varsity Theatre
1967	Antony and Cleopatra	Jerry Turner	William Shakespeare	Elizabethan Theatre
1967	Pericles, Prince of Tyre	Nagle Jackson	William Shakespeare	Elizabethan Theatre
1967	Richard III	Hugh C. Evans	William Shakespeare	Elizabethan Theatre
1967	The Taming of the Shrew	Richard D. Risso	William Shakespeare	Elizabethan Theatre
1967	The Maid of the Mill	Carl Ritchie	Samuel Arnold	Varsity Theatre
1968	As You Like It	William Kinsolving	William Shakespeare	Elizabethan Theatre
1968	Cymbeline	James Sandoe	William Shakespeare	Elizabethan Theatre
1968	Hamlet	Patrick Hines	William Shakespeare	Elizabethan Theatre
1968	Henry VIII	Richard D. Risso	William Shakespeare	Elizabethan Theatre
1968	Lock Up Your Daughters	Carl Ritchie	Henry Fielding	Varsity Theatre
1969	King John	Edward S. Brubaker	William Shakespeare	Elizabethan Theatre
1969	Romeo and Juliet	Patrick Hines	William Shakespeare	Elizabethan Theatre
1969	The Tempest	Richard D. Risso	William Shakespeare	Elizabethan Theatre
1969	Twelfth Night	Hugh C. Evans	William Shakespeare	Elizabethan Theatre
1969	Virtue in Danger	Carl Ritchie	Paul Dehn James Bernard	Varsity Theatre

== The 1970s ==
The 1970s began with the first season in the new Angus Bowmer Theatre. In 1977, after being used for company-only play performances and staged readings, the Black Swan Theatre became another venue presenting shows as a part of the main OSF season. The Black Swan was used for more experimental or intimate productions.

OSF Production History: 1960–1969
Year	Play	Playwright	Director	Theatre
1970	Rosencrantz and Guildenstern Are Dead	Tom Stoppard	Angus L. Bowmer	Angus Bowmer Theatre
1970	Antigone	Jean Anouilh	Larry Oliver	Angus Bowmer Theatre
1970	The Fantasticks	Tom Jones Harvey Schmidt	Peter Nyberg	Angus Bowmer Theatre
1970	The Imaginary Invalid	Molière	Raye Birk	Angus Bowmer Theatre
1970	The Merchant of Venice	William Shakespeare	Angus L. Bowmer	Angus Bowmer Theatre
1970	You Can't Take It with You	George S. Kaufman Moss Hart	Pat Patton	Angus Bowmer Theatre
1970	The Glass Menagerie	Tennessee Williams	Larry Oliver	Angus Bowmer Theatre
1970	Julius Caesar	William Shakespeare	Larry Oliver	Elizabethan Theatre
1970	Richard II	William Shakespeare	Jackson Nagle	Elizabethan Theatre
1970	The Comedy of Errors	William Shakespeare	Jackson Nagle	Elizabethan Theatre
1971	A Man for All Seasons	Robert Bolt	Pat Patton	Angus Bowmer Theatre
1971	Arsenic and Old Lace	Joseph Kesselring	Philip Davidson	Angus Bowmer Theatre
1971	A Midsummer Night's Dream	William Shakespeare	Raye Birk	Angus Bowmer Theatre
1971	Under Milk Wood	Dylan Thomas	Larry Oliver	Angus Bowmer Theatre
1971	The Glass Menagerie	Tennessee Williams	Larry Oliver	Angus Bowmer Theatre
1971	U.S.A.	John Dos Passos Paul Shyre	Jerry Turner	Angus Bowmer Theatre
1971	Henry IV, Part I	William Shakespeare	Pat Patton	Elizabethan Theatre
1971	Macbeth	William Shakespeare	Philip Davidson	Elizabethan Theatre
1971	Much Ado About Nothing	William Shakespeare	Larry Oliver	Elizabethan Theatre
1972	Room Service	Allen Boretz John Murray	Laird Williamson	Angus Bowmer Theatre
1972	The Crucible	Arthur Miller	Pat Patton	Angus Bowmer Theatre
1972	The Playboy of the Western World	J.M. Synge	Jerry Turner	Angus Bowmer Theatre
1972	Uncle Vanya	Anton Chekhov	Larry Oliver	Angus Bowmer Theatre
1972	Troilus and Cressida	William Shakespeare	Jerry Turner	Angus Bowmer Theatre
1972	Our Town	Thornton Wilder	Pat Patton	Angus Bowmer Theatre
1972	Love's Labor's Lost	William Shakespeare	Laird Williamson	Elizabethan Theatre
1972	The Taming of the Shrew	William Shakespeare	Robert Benedetti	Elizabethan Theatre
1972	Henry IV, Part II	William Shakespeare	William Roberts	Elizabethan Theatre
1973	Othello	William Shakespeare	Jerry Turner	Angus Bowmer Theatre
1973	The Alchemist	Ben Jonson	Laird Williamson	Angus Bowmer Theatre
1973	The Dance of Death	August Strindberg	Jerry Turner	Angus Bowmer Theatre
1973	The Importance of Being Earnest	Oscar Wilde	James Edmondson	Angus Bowmer Theatre
1973	Our Town	Thornton Wilder	Pat Patton	Angus Bowmer Theatre
1973	Waiting for Godot	Samuel Beckett	Andrew J. Traister	Angus Bowmer Theatre
1973	As You Like It	William Shakespeare	Pat Patton	Elizabethan Theatre
1973	Henry V	William Shakespeare	Laird Williamson	Elizabethan Theatre
1973	The Merry Wives of Windsor	William Shakespeare	Thomas B. Markus	Elizabethan Theatre
1973	O Rare Ben Jonson	David McPherson	Thomas B. Markus	Christian Science Church
1974	The Two Gentlemen of Verona	William Shakespeare	Laird Williamson	Angus Bowmer Theatre
1974	Hedda Gabler	Henrik Ibsen	Margaret Booker	Angus Bowmer Theatre
1974	A Funny Thing Happened on the Way to the Forum	Bert Shevelove Larry Gelbart Stephen Sondheim	Jerry Turner	Angus Bowmer Theatre
1974	The Time of Your Life	William Saroyan	Pat Patton	Angus Bowmer Theatre
1974	Waiting for Godot	Samuel Beckett	Andrew J. Traister	Angus Bowmer Theatre
1974	Hamlet	William Shakespeare	Jerry Turner	Elizabethan Theatre
1974	Twelfth Night	William Shakespeare	James Edmondson	Elizabethan Theatre
1974	Titus Andronicus	William Shakespeare	Laird Williamson	Elizabethan Theatre
1975	Charley's Aunt	Thomas Brandon	Pat Patton	Angus Bowmer Theatre
1975	Long Day's Journey Into Night	Eugene O'Neil	Jerry Turner	Angus Bowmer Theatre
1975	Oedipus the King	Sophocles	Robert B. Loper	Angus Bowmer Theatre
1975	The Petrified Forest	Robert E. Sherwood	Jerry Turner	Angus Bowmer Theatre
1975	The Winter's Tale	William Shakespeare	Audrey Stanley	Angus Bowmer Theatre
1975	All's Well That Ends Well	William Shakespeare	Jon Jory	Elizabethan Theatre
1975	Romeo and Juliet	William Shakespeare	James Edmondson	Elizabethan Theatre
1975	Henry VI, Part I	William Shakespeare	Will Huddleston	Elizabethan Theatre
1976	Brand	Henrik Ibsen	Jerry Turner	Angus Bowmer Theatre
1976	The Devil's Disciple	George Bernard Shaw	Michael Leibert	Angus Bowmer Theatre
1976	The Little Foxes	Lillian Hellman	James Moll	Angus Bowmer Theatre
1976	The Tavern	George M. Cohan	Pat Patton	Angus Bowmer Theatre
1976	The Comedy of Errors	William Shakespeare	Will Huddleston	Angus Bowmer Theatre
1976	Much Ado About Nothing	William Shakespeare	James Edmondson	Elizabethan Theatre
1976	King Lear	William Shakespeare	Pat Patton	Elizabethan Theatre
1976	Henry VI, Part II	William Shakespeare	Jerry Turner	Elizabethan Theatre
1977	A Streetcar Named Desire	Tennessee Williams	Elizabeth Huddle	Angus Bowmer Theatre
1977	Angel Street	Patrick Hamilton	Pat Patton	Angus Bowmer Theatre
1977	The Rivals	Richard Brinsley Sheridan	William Glover	Angus Bowmer Theatre
1977	Measure for Measure	William Shakespeare	Jerry Turner	Angus Bowmer Theatre
1977	A Taste of Honey	Shelagh Delaney	James Edmondson	Black Swan Theatre
1977	A Moon for the Misbegotten	Eugene O'Neil	Jerry Turner	Black Swan Theatre
1977	The Merchant of Venice	William Shakespeare	Michael Addison	Elizabethan Theatre
1977	Henry VI, Part III	William Shakespeare	Pat Patton	Elizabethan Theatre
1977	Antony and Cleopatra	William Shakespeare	Robert B. Loper	Elizabethan Theatre
1977	A Moon for the Misbegotten	Eugene O'Neil	Jerry Turner	Tao House
1978	Mother Courage and Her Children	Bertolt Brecht	Jerry Turner	Angus Bowmer Theatre
1978	Private Lives	Noël Coward	Dennis Bigelow	Angus Bowmer Theatre
1978	Tartuffe	Molière	Sabin Epstein	Angus Bowmer Theatre
1978	Miss Julie	August Strindberg	Elizabeth Huddle	Angus Bowmer Theatre
1978	Timon of Athens	William Shakespeare	Jerry Turner	Angus Bowmer Theatre
1978	Night of the Tribades	Per Olav Enquist	Jerry Turner	Black Swan Theatre
1978	The Effect of Gamma Rays on Man-in-the-Moon Marigolds	Paul Zindel	Willam Glover	Black Swan Theatre
1978	Richard III	William Shakespeare	Pat Patton	Elizabethan Theatre
1978	The Taming of the Shrew	William Shakespeare	Judd Parkin	Elizabethan Theatre
1978	The Tempest	William Shakespeare	Michael Addison	Elizabethan Theatre
1979	Born Yesterday	Garson Kanin	James Moll	Angus Bowmer Theatre
1979	The Play's the Thing	Ferenc Molnár	Dennis Bigelow	Angus Bowmer Theatre
1979	The Wild Duck	Henrik Ibsen		Angus Bowmer Theatre
1979	Macbeth	William Shakespeare	Pat Patton	Angus Bowmer Theatre
1979	Miss Julie	August Strindberg		Angus Bowmer Theatre
1979	Indulgences in the Louisville Harem	John Orlock	Michael Kevin	Black Swan Theatre
1979	Root of the Mandrake	Niccolò Machiavelli	Judd Parkin	Black Swan Theatre
1979	Who's Happy Now?	Oliver Hailey Tennessee Williams	Michael Leibert	Black Swan Theatre
1979	As You Like It	William Shakespeare	Audrey Stanley	Elizabethan Theatre
1979	A Midsummer Night's Dream	William Shakespeare	Dennis Bigelow	Elizabethan Theatre
1979	The Tragical History of Doctor Faustus	Christopher Marlowe	Jerry Turner	Elizabethan Theatre

== The 1980s ==
OSF Production History: 1980–1989
Year	Play	Theatre
1980	As You Like It	Angus Bowmer Theatre
1980	Coriolanus	Angus Bowmer Theatre
1980	Juno and the Paycock	Angus Bowmer Theatre
1980	Laundry and Bourbon	Angus Bowmer Theatre
1980	Lone Star	Black Swan Theatre
1980	Love's Labor's Lost	Elizabethan Theatre
1980	Of Mice and Men	Angus Bowmer Theatre
1980	Richard II	Elizabethan Theatre
1980	Ring Round the Moon	Angus Bowmer Theatre
1980	Seascape	Black Swan Theatre
1980	Sizwe Bansi Is Dead	Black Swan Theatre
1980	The Merry Wives of Windsor	Elizabethan Theatre
1980	The Merry Wives of Windsor	Angus Bowmer Theatre
1980	The Philadelphia Story	Angus Bowmer Theatre
1981	'Tis Pity She's a Whore	Angus Bowmer Theatre
1981	Artichoke	Black Swan
1981	Death of a Salesman	Angus Bowmer Theatre
1981	Henry IV, Part One	Elizabethan Theatre
1981	Othello	Angus Bowmer Theatre
1981	The Birthday Party	Black Swan
1981	The Island	Angus Bowmer Theatre
1981	Two Gentlemen of Verona	Elizabethan Theatre
1981	Twelfth Night	Angus Bowmer Theatre
1981	Twelfth Night	Elizabethan Theatre
1981	Wild Oats	Angus Bowmer Theatre
1982	Blithe Spirit	Angus Bowmer Theatre
1982	Henry V	Elizabethan Theatre
1982	Hold Me!	Black Swan
1982	Inherit the Wind	Angus Bowmer Theatre
1982	Julius Caesar	Angus Bowmer Theatre
1982	Othello	Angus Bowmer Theatre
1982	Romeo and Juliet	Elizabethan Theatre
1982	Spokesong	Angus Bowmer Theatre
1982	Comedy of Errors	Elizabethan Theatre
1982	The Father	Black Swan
1982	The Matchmaker	Angus Bowmer Theatre
1982	Wings	Black Swan
1983	Ah, Wilderness!	Angus Bowmer Theatre
1983	Cymbeline	Elizabethan Theatre
1983	Don Juan in Hell	Black Swan
1983	Dracula	Angus Bowmer Theatre
1983	Dreamhouse	Black Swan
1983	Hamlet	Angus Bowmer Theatre
1983	Man and Superman	Angus Bowmer Theatre
1983	Much Ado about Nothing	Elizabethan Theatre
1983	Richard III	Elizabethan Theatre
1983	The Entertainer	Black Swan
1983	The Matchmaker	Angus Bowmer Theatre
1983	What the Butler Saw	Angus Bowmer Theatre
1984	Cat on a Hot Tin Roof	Angus Bowmer Theatre
1984	Dracula	Angus Bowmer Theatre
1984	Hay Fever	Angus Bowmer Theatre
1984	Henry VIII	Elizabethan Theatre
1984	London Assurance	Angus Bowmer Theatre
1984	Seascape with Sharks and Dancer	Black Swan
1984	The Revenger's Tragedy	Angus Bowmer Theatre
1984	Taming of the Shrew	Elizabethan Theatre
1984	Winter's Tale	Elizabethan Theatre
1984	Translations	Black Swan
1984	Troilus and Cressida	Angus Bowmer Theatre
1985	All's Well That Ends Well	Black Swan
1985	An Enemy of the People	Angus Bowmer Theatre
1985	Crimes of the Heart	Angus Bowmer Theatre
1985	King John	Elizabethan
1985	King Lear	Angus Bowmer Theatre
1985	Light up the Sky	Angus Bowmer Theatre
1985	Lizzie Borden in the Late Afternoon	Black Swan
1985	Strange Snow	Black Swan
1985	The Majestic Kid	Black Swan
1985	Merchant of Venice	Elizabethan Theatre
1985	Trelawny of the "Wells"	Angus Bowmer Theatre
1986	An Enemy of the People	Angus Bowmer Theatre
1986	As You Like It	Elizabethan Theatre
1986	Broadway	Angus Bowmer Theatre
1986	Measure for Measure	Elizabethan Theatre
1986	On the Verge	Angus Bowmer Theatre
1986	Sea Marks	Black Swan Theatre
1986	Strange Snow	Black Swan Theatre
1986	The Tempest	Angus Bowmer Theatre
1986	Threepenny Opera	Angus Bowmer Theatre
1986	Three Sisters	Angus Bowmer Theatre
1986	Titus Andronicus	Elizabethan Theatre
1987	"Master Harold"...and the Boys	Black Swan Theatre
1987	A Midsummer Night's Dream	Elizabethan Theatre
1987	Ballerina	Black Swn Theatre
1987	Curse of the Starving Class	Angus Bowmer Theatre
1987	Macbeth	Elizabethan Theatre
1987	Richard II	Angus Bowmer Theatre
1987	She Stoops to Conquer	Angus Bowmer Theatre
1987	Taking Steps	Black Swan Theatre
1987	The Hostage	Angus Bowmer Theatre
1987	Member of the Wedding	Angus Bowmer Theatre
1987	Shoemakers' Holiday	Elizabethan Theatre
1988	A Penny for a Song	Angus Bowmer Theatre
1988	Boy Meets Girl	Angus Bowmer Theatre
1988	Enrico IV	Angus Bowmer Theatre
1988	Ghosts	Black Swan Theatre
1988	Henry IV, Part One	Elizabethan Theatre
1988	Love's Labor's Lost	Elizabethan Theatre
1988	Orphans	Black Swan Theatre
1988	Romeo and Juliet	Angus Bowmer Theatre
1988	The Iceman Cometh	Angus Bowmer Theatre
1988	The Marriage of Bette and Boo	Black Swan Theatre
1988	Twelfth Night	Elizabethan Theatre
1989	All My Sons	Angus Bowmer Theatre
1989	And a Nightingale Sang...	Angus Bowmer Theatre
1989	Breaking the Silence	Angus Bowmer Theatre
1989	Cyrano de Bergerac	Angus Bowmer Theatre
1989	Henry IV, Part II	Elizabethan Theatre
1989	Hunting Cockroaches	Black Swan Theatre
1989	Much Ado About Nothing	Elizabethan Theatre
1989	Not About Heroes	Black Swan Theatre
1989	Pericles, Prince of Tyre	Angus Bowmer Theatre
1989	The Road to Mecca	Black Swan Theatre
1989	Two Gentlemen of Verona	Elizabethan Theatre

== The 1990s ==
OSF Production History: 1990–1999
Year	Play	Theatre
1990	God's Country	Angus Bowmer Theatre
1990	Peer Gynt	Angus Bowmer Theatre
1990	The Merry Wives of Windsor	Angus Bowmer Theatre
1990	The House of Blue Leaves	Angus Bowmer Theatre
1990	Aristocrats	Angus Bowmer Theatre
1990	At Long Last Leo	Black Swan Theatre
1990	The Second Man	Black Swan Theatre
1990	The Voice of the Prairie	Black Swan Theatre
1990	Henry V	Elizabethan Stage
1990	The Winter's Tale	Elizabethan Stage
1990	The Comedy of Errors	Elizabethan Stage
1991	Major Barbara	Angus Bowmer Theatre
1991	Other People's Money	Angus Bowmer Theatre
1991	Our Town	Angus Bowmer Theatre
1991	The Merchant of Venice	Angus Bowmer Theatre
1991	Some Americans Abroad	Black Swan Theatre
1991	Two Rooms	Black Swan Theatre
1991	Woman in Mind	Black Swan Theatre
1991	Julius Caesar	Elizabethan Stage
1991	The First Part of Henry VI	Elizabethan Stage
1991	The Taming of the Shrew	Elizabethan Stage
1992	All's Well That Ends Well	Angus Bowmer Theatre
1992	La Bete	Angus Bowmer Theatre
1992	The Ladies of the Camellias	Angus Bowmer Theatre
1992	The Playboy of the Western World	Angus Bowmer Theatre
1992	Toys in the Attic	Angus Bowmer Theatre
1992	Heathen Valley	Black Swan Theatre
1992	Restoration	Black Swan Theatre
1992	The Firebugs	Black Swan Theatre
1992	As You Like It	Elizabethan Stage
1992	Othello	Elizabethan Stage
1992	The Conclusion of Henry VI	Elizabethan Stage
1993	A Flea in Her Ear	Angus Bowmer Theatre
1993	Joe Turner's Come and Gone	Angus Bowmer Theatre
1993	Lips Together, Teeth Apart	Angus Bowmer Theatre
1993	Richard III	Angus Bowmer Theatre
1993	The Illusion	Angus Bowmer Theatre
1993	Theresa Bassoon	Angus Bowmer Theatre
1993	Cymbeline	Black Swan Theatre
1993	Light in the Village	Black Swan Theatre
1993	The Baltimore Waltz	Black Swan Theatre
1993	Mad Forest	Black Swan Theatre
1993	A Midsummer Night's Dream	Elizabethan Stage
1993	Antony and Cleopatra	Elizabethan Stage
1993	The White Devil	Elizabethan Stage
1994	Fifth of July	Angus Bowmer Theatre
1994	Hamlet	Angus Bowmer Theatre
1994	You Can't Take It With You	Angus Bowmer Theatre
1994	The Pool of Bethesda	Angus Bowmer Theatre
1994	The Rehearsal	Angus Bowmer Theatre
1994	Tales of the Lost Formicans	Black Swan Theatre
1994	Oleanna	Black Swan Theatre
1994	The Colored Museum	Black Swan Theatre
1994	Much Ado About Nothing	Elizabethan Stage
1994	The Tempest	Elizabethan Stage
1994	The Two Noble Kinsmen	Elizabethan Stage
1995	Pravda	Angus Bowmer Theatre
1995	The Skin of Our Teeth	Angus Bowmer Theatre
1995	This Day and Age	Angus Bowmer Theatre
1995	Twelfth Night	Angus Bowmer Theatre
1995	Blood Wedding	Angus Bowmer Theatre
1995	Emma's Child	Black Swan Theatre
1995	From the Mississippi Delta	Black Swan Theatre
1995	The Cure at Troy	Black Swan Theatre
1995	Macbeth	Elizabethan Stage
1995	Richard II	Elizabethan Stage
1995	The Merry Wives of Windsor	Elizabethan Stage
1996	Arcadia	Angus Bowmer Theatre
1996	Awake and Sing!	Angus Bowmer Theatre
1996	Molière Plays Paris	Angus Bowmer Theatre
1996	The Winter's Tale	Angus Bowmer Theatre
1996	This Day and Age	Angus Bowmer Theatre
1996	The Darker Face of the Earth	Angus Bowmer Theatre
1996	A Pair of Threes: Three Viewings and Three Hotels	Black Swan Theatre
1996	Cabaret Verboten	Black Swan Theatre
1996	Strindberg in Hollywood	Black Swan Theatre
1996	Coriolanus	Elizabethan Stage
1996	Love's Labor's Lost	Elizabethan Stage
1996	Romeo and Juliet	Elizabethan Stage
1997	Death of a Salesman	Angus Bowmer Theatre
1997	King Lear	Angus Bowmer Theatre
1997	Pentecost	Angus Bowmer Theatre
1997	Rough Crossing	Angus Bowmer Theatre
1997	The Magic Fire	Angus Bowmer Theatre
1997	Blues for an Alabama Sky	Black Swan Theatre
1997	The Turn of the Screw	Black Swan Theatre
1997	Nora	Black Swan Theatre
1997	The Two Gentlemen of Verona	Elizabethan Stage
1997	Timon of Athens	Elizabethan Stage
1997	As You Like It	Elizabethan Stage
1998	A Touch of the Poet	Angus Bowmer Theatre
1998	Les Blancs	Angus Bowmer Theatre
1998	Midsummer Night's Dream	Angus Bowmer Theatre
1998	The School for Scandal	Angus Bowmer Theatre
1998	Uncle Vanya	Angus Bowmer Theatre
1998	Sailing to Byzantium	Black Swan Theatre
1998	Vilna's Got a Golem	Black Swan Theatre
1998	Measure for Measure	Black Swan Theatre
1998	Cymbeline	Elizabethan Stage
1998	Henry IV, Part One	Elizabethan Stage
1998	The Comedy of Errors	Elizabethan Stage
1999	Chicago	Angus Bowmer Theatre
1999	Good Person of Szechuan	Angus Bowmer Theatre
1999	Othello	Angus Bowmer Theatre
1999	Pericles	Angus Bowmer Theatre
1999	Seven Guitars	Angus Bowmer Theatre
1999	El Paso Blue	Black Swan Theatre
1999	Rosmersholm	Black Swan Theatre
1999	Tongue of a Bird	Black Swan Theatre
1999	Three Musketeers	Elizabethan Stage
1999	Henry IV, Part Two	Elizabethan Stage
1999	Much Ado About Nothing	Elizabethan Stage

== The 2000s ==
The early 2000s saw the decommissioning of the Black Swan Theatre as a venue for the regular season and the construction and opening of the New Theatre that would later be renamed as the Thomas Theatre in 2013. The Black Swan closed at the end of the 2001 season on October 28, and the New Theatre started performances in March 2002.

The decade also saw a change in leadership. In 2007, Libby Appel ended her tenure as the Artistic Director. The 2008 season was the first for Bill Rauch, who became the fifth person to assume the role.

OSF Production History: 1990–1999
Year	Play	Playwright	Director	Theatre
2000	Henry V	William Shakespeare	Libby Appel	Angus Bowmer Theatre
2000	The Man Who Came to Dinner	George S. Kaufman Moss Hart	Warner Shook	Angus Bowmer Theatre
2000	The Night of the Iguana	Tennessee Williams	Penny Metropulos	Angus Bowmer Theatre
2000	Force of Nature	Steven Dietz	James Edmondson	Angus Bowmer Theatre
2000	The Trojan Women	Euripides	Liz Diamond	Angus Bowmer Theatre
2000	Wit	Margaret Edison	John Dillon	Black Swan Theatre
2000	Crumbs from the Table of Joy	Lynn Nottage	Seret Scott	Black Swan Theatre
2000	Stop Kiss	Diana Son	Loretta Greco	Black Swan Theatre
2000	Hamlet	William Shakespeare	Libby Appel	Elizabethan Stage
2000	Twelfth Night	William Shakespeare	Timothy Bond	Elizabethan Stage
2000	The Taming of the Shrew	William Shakespeare	Kenneth Albers	Elizabethan Stage
2001	The Tempest	William Shakespeare	Penny Metropulos	Angus Bowmer Theatre
2001	Enter the Guardsman	Scott Wentworth Marion Alder Craig Bohmler	Peter Amster	Angus Bowmer Theatre
2001	Life is a Dream	Pedro Calderón de la Barca	Laird Williamson	Angus Bowmer Theatre
2001	Oo-Bla-Dee	Regina Taylor	Timothy Bond	Angus Bowmer Theatre
2001	Three Sisters	Anton Chekhov	Libby Appel	Angus Bowmer Theatre
2001	The Trip to Bountiful	Horton Foote	Libby Appel	Black Swan Theatre final season
2001	Fuddy Meers	David Lindsay-Abaire	James Edmondson	Black Swan Theatre final season
2001	Two Sisters and a Piano	Nilo Cruz	Andrea Frye	Black Swan Theatre final season
2001	The Merchant of Venice	William Shakespeare	Michael Donald Edwards	Elizabethan Stage
2001	Troilus and Cressida	William Shakespeare	Kenneth Albers	Elizabethan Stage
2001	The Merry Wives of Windsor	William Shakespeare	Lillian Groag	Elizabethan Stage
2002	Julius Caesar	William Shakespeare	Laird Williamson	Angus Bowmer Theatre
2002	Noises Off	Michael Frayn	Kenneth Albers	Angus Bowmer Theatre
2002	Idiot's Delight	Robert E. Sherwood	Peter Amster	Angus Bowmer Theatre
2002	Who's Afraid of Virginia Woolf?	Edward Albee	Timothy Bond	Angus Bowmer Theatre
2002	Saturday, Sunday, Monday	Eduardo De Filippo	Libby Appel	Angus Bowmer Theatre
2002	Macbeth	William Shakespeare	Libby Appel	New Theatre debut season
2002	Handler	Robert Schenkkan	Bill Rauch	New Theatre debut season
2002	Playboy of the West Indies	Mustapha Matura	Kenny Leon	New Theatre debut season
2002	The Winter's Tale	William Shakespeare	Michael Donald Edwards	Elizabethan Stage
2002	Titus Andronicus	William Shakespeare	James Edmondson	Elizabethan Stage
2002	As You Like It	William Shakespeare	Penny Metropulos	Elizabethan Stage
2003	Romeo and Juliet	William Shakespeare	Loretta Greco	Angus Bowmer Theatre
2003	Daughters of the Revolution Continental Divide, Part 2	David Edgar	Tony Taccone	Angus Bowmer Theatre
2003	Present Laughter	Noël Coward	Peter Amster	Angus Bowmer Theatre
2003	Hedda Gabler	Henrik Ibsen	Bill Rauch	Angus Bowmer Theatre
2003	The Piano Lesson	August Wilson	Timothy Bond	Angus Bowmer Theatre
2003	Mothers Against Continental Divide, Part 1	David Edgar	Tony Taccone	New Theatre
2003	Antony and Cleopatra	William Shakespeare	Penny Metropulos	New Theatre
2003	Lorca in a Green Dress	Nilo Cruz	Penny Metropulos	New Theatre
2003	Richard II	William Shakespeare	Libby Appel	Elizabethan Stage
2003	Wild Oats	John O'Keeffe	James Edmondson	Elizabethan Stage
2003	A Midsummer Night's Dream	William Shakespeare	Kenneth Albers	Elizabethan Stage
2004	The Comedy of Errors	William Shakespeare	Bill Rauch	Angus Bowmer Theatre
2004	The Royal Family	Edna Ferber George S. Kaufman	Peter Amster	Angus Bowmer Theatre
2004	The Visit	Friedrich Dürrenmatt	Kenneth Albers	Angus Bowmer Theatre
2004	A Raisin in the Sun	Lorraine Hansberry	Andrea Frye	Angus Bowmer Theatre
2004	Oedipus Complex	Frank Galati	Frank Galati	Angus Bowmer Theatre
2004	Topdog/Underdog	Suzan-Lori Parks	Timothy Bond	New Theatre
2004	Henry VI Part One: Talbot & Joan	William Shakespeare	Libby Appel Scott Kaiser	New Theatre
2004	Humble Boy	Charlotte Jones	Penny Metropulos	New Theatre
2004	King Lear	William Shakespeare	James Edmondson	Elizabethan Stage
2004	Henry VI Parts Two & Three: Henry & Margaret	William Shakespeare	Libby Appel Scott Kaiser	Elizabethan Stage
2004	Much Ado About Nothing	William Shakespeare	Laird Williamson	Elizabethan Stage
2005	Richard III	William Shakespeare	Libby Appel	Angus Bowmer Theatre
2005	The Philanderer	George Bernard Shaw	Penny Metropulos	Angus Bowmer Theatre
2005	Room Service	John Murray Allen Boretz	J.R. Sullivan	Angus Bowmer Theatre
2005	Napoli milionaria! (Millionaire Naples!)	Eduardo De Filippo	Libby Appel	Angus Bowmer Theatre
2005	The Belle's Stratagem	Hannah Cowley	Davis McCallum	Angus Bowmer Theatre
2005	By the Waters of Babylon	Robert Schenkkan	Bill Rauch	New Theatre
2005	Ma Rainey's Black Bottom	August Wilson	Timothy Bond	New Theatre
2005	Gibraltar	Octavio Solis	Liz Diamond	New Theatre
2005	Twelfth Night	William Shakespeare	Peter Amster	Elizabethan Stage
2005	The Tragical History of Doctor Faustus	Christopher Marlowe	James Edmondson	Elizabethan Stage
2005	Love's Labor's Lost	William Shakespeare	Kenneth Albers	Elizabethan Stage
2006	The Winter's Tale	William Shakespeare	Libby Appel	Angus Bowmer Theatre
2006	The Diary of Anne Frank	Frances Goodrich Albert Hackett	James Edmondson	Angus Bowmer Theatre
2006	The Importance of Being Earnest	Oscar Wilde	Peter Amster	Angus Bowmer Theatre
2006	Intimate Apparel	Lynn Nottage	Timothy Bond	Angus Bowmer Theatre
2006	Dr. Jekyll and Mr. Hyde	David Edgar	Penny Metropulos	Angus Bowmer Theatre
2006	UP	Bridget Carpenter	Michael Barakiva	New Theatre
2006	Bus Stop	William Inge	Libby Appel	New Theatre
2006	King John	William Shakespeare	John Sipes	New Theatre
2006	The Merry Wives of Windsor	William Shakespeare	Andrew Tsao	Elizabethan Stage
2006	Cyrano de Bergerac	Edmond Rostand	Laird Williamson	Elizabethan Stage
2006	The Two Gentlemen of Verona	William Shakespeare	Bill Rauch	Elizabethan Stage
2007	As You Like It	William Shakespeare	J.R. Sullivan	Angus Bowmer Theatre
2007	The Cherry Orchard	Anton Chekhov	Libby Appel	Angus Bowmer Theatre
2007	On The Razzle	Tom Stoppard	Laird Williamson	Angus Bowmer Theatre
2007	Gem of the Ocean	August Wilson	Timothy Bond	Angus Bowmer Theatre
2007	Tartuffe	Molière adapted and translated by Ranjit Bolt	Peter Amster	Angus Bowmer Theatre
2007	Rabbit Hole	David Lindsay-Abaire	James Edmondson	New Theatre
2007	Tracy's Tiger	Linda Alper Douglas Langworthy Penny Metropulos Sterling Tinsley	Penny Metropulos	New Theatre
2007	Distracted	Lisa Loomer	Liz Diamond	New Theatre
2007	The Tempest	William Shakespeare	Libby Appel Final show as Artistic Director	Elizabethan Stage
2007	The Taming of the Shrew	William Shakespeare	Kate Buckley	Elizabethan Stage
2007	Romeo and Juliet	William Shakespeare	Bill Rauch	Elizabethan Stage
2008	A Midsummer Night's Dream	William Shakespeare	Mark Rucker	Angus Bowmer Theatre
2008	The Clay Cart	Sudraka	Bill Rauch	Angus Bowmer Theatre
2008	Fences	August Wilson	Leah C. Gardiner	Angus Bowmer Theatre
2008	A View From the Bridge	Arthur Miller	Libby Appel	Angus Bowmer Theatre
2008	The Further Adventures of Hedda Gabler	Jeff Whitty	Bill Rauch	Angus Bowmer Theatre
2008	Welcome Home, Jenny Sutter	Julie Myatt	Jessica Thebus	New Theatre
2008	Coriolanus	William Shakespeare	Laird Williamson	New Theatre
2008	Breakfast, Lunch & Dinner	Luis Alfaro	Tracy Young	New Theatre
2008	Othello	William Shakespeare	Lisa Peterson	Elizabethan Stage
2008	Our Town	Thornton Wilder	Chay Yew	Elizabethan Stage
2008	The Comedy of Errors	William Shakespeare	Penny Metropulos	Elizabethan Stage
2009	Macbeth	William Shakespeare	Gale Edwards	Angus Bowmer Theatre
2009	Death and the King's Horseman	Wole Soyinka	Chuck Smith	Angus Bowmer Theatre
2009	The Music Man	Meredith Willson Franklin Lacey	Bill Rauch	Angus Bowmer Theatre
2009	Equivocation	Bill Cain	Bill Rauch	Angus Bowmer Theatre
2009	Paradise Lost	Clifford Odets	Libby Appel	Angus Bowmer Theatre
2009	Dead Man's Cell Phone	Sarah Ruhl	Christopher Liam Moore	New Theatre
2009	Servant of Two Masters	Carlo Goldoni	Tracy Young	New Theatre
2009	All's Well That Ends Well	William Shakespeare	Amanda Dehnert	New Theatre
2009	Henry VIII	William Shakespeare	John Sipes	Elizabethan Stage
2009	Don Quixote	Miguel de Cervantes Saavedra	Laird Williamson	Elizabethan Stage
2009	Much Ado About Nothing	William Shakespeare	Kate Buckley	Elizabethan Stage

== The 2010s ==
Several theaters underwent name changes for the 2013 season. The New Theatre finally gained a formal name as the Thomas Theatre. The Elizabethan Stage and Allen Pavilion were united under one name as the Allen Elizabethan Theatre, thanks to a $3 Million grant from the Paul G. Allen Family Foundation.

In 2014, the Festival announced their Canon in a Decade initiative. In the next ten years, from 2015 to 2024, the Festival would be producing the complete Shakespeare Canon to honor the 80th anniversary of the festival. This project is in progress, and may have been affected by shut downs due to the COVID-19 pandemic.

In August 2019, Bill Rauch left the position of Artistic Director. Nataki Garrett is his successor, and she is the sixth person to hold the position.

OSF Production History: 2010–2019
Year	Play	Playwright	Director	Theatre
2010	Hamlet	William Shakespeare	Bill Rauch	Angus Bowmer Theatre
2010	Pride and Prejudice	Jane Austen Joseph Hanreddy (adapter) J. R. Sullivan (adapter)	Libby Appel	Angus Bowmer Theatre
2010	Cat on a Hot Tin Roof	Tennessee Williams	Christopher Liam Moore	Angus Bowmer Theatre
2010	She Loves Me	Joe Masteroff Jerry Bock Sheldon Harnick	Rebecca Bayla Taichman	Angus Bowmer Theatre
2010	Throne of Blood	Akira Kurasawa Hideo Oguni Shinobu Hashimoto Ryuzo Kikushima	Ping Chong director and adaptor	Angus Bowmer Theatre
2010	Well	Lisa Kron	James Edmondson	New Theatre
2010	Ruined	Lynn Nottage	Liesl Tommy	New Theatre
2010	American Night: The Ballad of Juan José	Richard Montoya, Ric Salinas, Herbert Siguenza	Jo Bonney	New Theatre
2010	Twelfth Night	William Shakespeare	Darko Tresnjak	Elizabethan Stage
2010	Henry IV, Part One	William Shakespeare	Penny Metropulos	Elizabethan Stage
2010	The Merchant of Venice	William Shakespeare	Bill Rauch	Elizabethan Stage
2011	Measure for Measure	William Shakespeare	Bill Rauch	Angus Bowmer Theatre
2011	The Imaginary Invalid	Molière adapted by Oded Gross & Tracy Young	Tracy Young	Angus Bowmer Theatre
2011	To Kill a Mockingbird	Harper Lee adapted by Christopher Sergel	Marion McClinton	Angus Bowmer Theatre
2011	August: Osage County	Tracy Letts	Christopher Liam Moore	Angus Bowmer Theatre
2011	The African Company Presents Richard III	Carlyle Brown	Seret Scott	Angus Bowmer Theatre
2011	The Language Archive	Julia Cho	Laurie Woolery	New Theatre
2011	Julius Caesar	William Shakespeare	Amanda Dehnert	New Theatre
2011	Ghost Light	Tony Taccone	Johnathan Moscone	New Theatre
2011	Love's Labor's Lost	William Shakespeare	Shana Cooper	Elizabethan Stage
2011	Henry IV, Part Two	William Shakespeare	Lisa Peterson	Elizabethan Stage
2011	The Pirates of Penzance	Arthur Sullivan W. S. Gilbert	Bill Rauch	Elizabethan Stage
2012	Romeo and Juliet	William Shakespeare	Laird Williamson	Angus Bowmer Theatre
2012	All the Way	Robert Schenkkan	Bill Rauch	Angus Bowmer Theatre
2012	The White Snake	adapted by Mary Zimmerman	Mary Zimmerman	Angus Bowmer Theatre
2012	Animal Crackers	George S. Kaufman; Morrie Ryskind adapted by Henry Wishcamper	Allison Narver	Angus Bowmer Theatre
2012	Medea/Macbeth/Cinderella	Euripides; William Shakespeare; Rodgers and Hammerstein	Bill Rauch; Tracy Young directors and adaptors	Angus Bowmer Theatre
2012	Party People	UNIVERSES (Steven Sapp; Mildred Ruiz Sapp; William Ruiz aka Ninja)	Liesl Tommy	New Theatre
2012	Seagull	Anton Chekhov adapted by Libby Appel	Libby Appel Rob Melrose	New Theatre
2012	Troilus and Cressida	William Shakespeare	Rob Melrose	New Theatre
2012	Henry V	William Shakespeare	Joseph Haj	Elizabethan Stage
2012	As You Like it	William Shakespeare	Jessica Thebus	Elizabethan Stage
2012	The Very Merry Wives of Windsor, Iowa	William Shakespeare	Christopher Liam Moore	Elizabethan Stage
2013	The Taming of the Shrew	William Shakespeare	David Ivers	Angus Bowmer Theatre
2013	My Fair Lady	George Bernard Shaw Frederick Loewe Alan Jay Lerner	Amanda Dehnert	Angus Bowmer Theatre
2013	Two Trains Running	August Wilson	Lou Bellamy	Angus Bowmer Theatre
2013	A Streetcar Named Desire	Tennessee Williams	Christopher Liam Moore	Angus Bowmer Theatre
2013	The Tenth Muse	Tanya Saracho	Laurie Woolery	Angus Bowmer Theatre
2013	King Lear	William Shakespeare	Bill Rauch	Thomas Theatre formerly "New Theatre"
2013	The Unfortunates	Jon Beavers Casey Hurt Ian Merrican Ramiz Monsef	Shana Cooper	Thomas Theatre formerly "New Theatre"
2013	The Liquid Plain	Naomi Wallace	Kwame Kwei-Armah	Thomas Theatre formerly "New Theatre"
2013	Cymbeline	William Shakespeare	Bill Rauch	Elizabethan Stage
2013	The Heart of Robin Hood	David Farr	Joel Sass	Elizabethan Stage
2013	A Midsummer Night's Dream	William Shakespeare	Christopher Liam Moore	Elizabethan Stage
2014	The Tempest	William Shakespeare	Tony Taccone	Angus Bowmer Theatre
2014	The Cocoanuts	Irving Berlin George S. Kaufman Mark Bedard (adapter)	David Ivers	Angus Bowmer Theatre
2014	The Sign in Sidney Brustein's Window	Lorraine Hansberry	Juliette Carillo	Angus Bowmer Theatre
2014	A Wrinkle in Time	Madeleine L'Engle (author) Tracy Young (adapter)	Tracy Young	Angus Bowmer Theatre
2014	The Great Society	Robert Schenkkan	Bill Rauch	Angus Bowmer Theatre
2014	The Comedy of Errors	William Shakespeare	Kent Gash	Thomas Theatre
2014	Water by the Spoonful	Quiara Alegría Hudes	Shishir Kurup	Thomas Theatre
2014	Family Album	Stew Joanna Settle Heidi Rodewald	Joanna Settle	Thomas Theatre
2014	Richard III	William Shakespeare	James Bundy	Allen Elizabethan Theatre formerly "Elizabethan Stage"
2014	Into the Woods	James LaPine Stephen Sondheim	Amanda Dehnert	Allen Elizabethan Theatre formerly "Elizabethan Stage"
2014	The Two Gentlemen of Verona	William Shakespeare	Sarah Rasmussen	Allen Elizabethan Theatre formerly "Elizabethan Stage"
2015	Much Ado About Nothing	William Shakespeare	Lileana Blain-Cruz	Angus Bowmer Theatre
2015	Guys and Dolls	Frank Loesser Jo Swerling Abe Burrows	Mary Zimmerman	Angus Bowmer Theatre
2015	Fingersmith	Alexa Junge	Bill Rauch	Angus Bowmer Theatre
2015	Secret Love in Peach Blossom Land	Stan Lai	Stan Lai	Angus Bowmer Theatre
2015	Sweat	Lynn Nottage	Kate Whoriskey	Angus Bowmer Theatre
2015	Pericles	William Shakespeare	Joseph Haj	Thomas Theatre
2015	Long Day's Journey into Night	Eugene O'Neill	Christopher Liam Moore	Thomas Theatre
2015	The Happiest Song Plays Last	Quiara Alegría Hudes	Shishir Kurup	Thomas Theatre
2015	Antony and Cleopatra	William Shakespeare	Bill Rauch	Allen Elizabethan Theatre
2015	Head over Heels	Jeff Whitty The Go-Go's	Ed Sylvanus Iskandar	Allen Elizabethan Theatre
2015	The Count of Monte Cristo	Alexandre Dumas	Marcela Lorca	Allen Elizabethan Theatre
2016	Twelfth Night	William Shakespeare	Christopher Liam Moore	Angus Bowmer Theatre
2016	Great Expectations	Penny Metropulos (adapter) Linda Alper (adapter) Charles Dickens (author)	Penny Metropulos	Angus Bowmer Theatre
2016	The River Bride	Marisela Treviño Orta	Laurie Woolery	Angus Bowmer Theatre
2016	Roe	Lisa Loomer	Bill Rauch	Angus Bowmer Theatre
2016	Timon of Athens	William Shakespeare	Amanda Dehnert	Angus Bowmer Theatre
2016	Yeoman of the Guard	Arthur Sullivan and W. S. Gilbert Sean Graney, Andra Velis, & Matt Kahler (adapters)	Sean Graney	Thomas Theatre
2016	Vietgone	Qui Nguyen	May Adrales	Thomas Theatre
2016	Richard II	William Shakespeare	Bill Rauch	Thomas Theatre
2016	Hamlet	William Shakespeare	Lisa Peterson	Allen Elizabethan Theatre
2016	The Wiz	William F. Brown Charlie Smalls Frank L. Baum	Robert O'Hara	Allen Elizabethan Theatre
2016	The Winter's Tale	William Shakespeare	Desdemona Chiang	Allen Elizabethan Theatre
2017	Julius Caesar	William Shakespeare	Shana Cooper	Angus Bowmer Theatre
2017	Shakespeare in Love	Marc Norman Tom Stoppard Lee Hall	Christopher Liam Moore	Angus Bowmer Theatre
2017	Mojada: A Medea in Los Angeles	Luis Alfaro	Juliette Carillo	Angus Bowmer Theatre
2017	UniSon	UNIVERSES	Robert O'Hara	Angus Bowmer Theatre
2017	Off the Rails	Randy Reinholz	Bill Rauch	Angus Bowmer Theatre
2017	Henry IV, Part One	William Shakespeare	Lileana Blain-Cruz	Thomas Theatre
2017	Hannah and the Dread Gazebo	Jiehae Park	Chay Yew	Thomas Theatre
2017	Henry IV, Part Two	William Shakespeare	Carl Cofield	Thomas Theatre
2017	The Merry Wives of Windsor	William Shakespeare	Dawn Monique Williams	Allen Elizabethan Theatre
2017	The Odyssey	Homer Mary Zimmerman (adapter)	Mary Zimmerman	Allen Elizabethan Theatre
2017	Disney's Beauty and the Beast	Alan Menken Howard Ashman Tim Rice Linda Woolverton	Eric Tucker	Allen Elizabethan Theatre
2018	Othello	William Shakespeare	Bill Rauch	Angus Bowmer Theatre
2018	Sense and Sensibility	Jane Austen Kate Hamill (adapter)	Hana Sharif	Angus Bowmer Theatre
2018	Destiny of Desire	Karen Zacarias	José Luis Valenzuela	Angus Bowmer Theatre
2018	Oklahoma!	Richard Rodgers Oscar Hammerstein II	Bill Rauch	Angus Bowmer Theatre
2018	Snow in Midsummer	Francis Ya-Chu Cowhig	Justin Audibert	Angus Bowmer Theatre
2018	Henry V	William Shakespeare	Rosa Joshi	Thomas Theatre
2018	Manahatta	Mary Kathryn Nagle	Laurie Woolery	Thomas Theatre
2018	The Way the Mountain Moved	Idris Goodwin	May Adrales	Thomas Theatre
2018	Romeo and Juliet	William Shakespeare	Dámaso Rodríguez	Allen Elizabethan Theatre
2018	The Book of Will	Lauren Gunderson	Christopher Liam Moore	Allen Elizabethan Theatre
2018	Love's Labor's Lost	William Shakespeare	Amanda Dehnert	Allen Elizabethan Theatre
2019	As You Like It	William Shakespeare	Rosa Joshi	Angus Bowmer Theatre
2019	Hairspray	Marc Shaiman; Scott Wittman; John Waters	Christopher Liam Moore	Angus Bowmer Theatre
2019	Mother Road	Octavio Solis	Bill Rauch	Angus Bowmer Theatre
2019	Indecent	Paula Vogel	Shana Cooper	Angus Bowmer Theatre
2019	Cambodian Rock Band	Lauren Yee	Chay Yew	Thomas Theatre
2019	Between Two Knees	1491s	Eric Ting	Thomas Theatre
2019	How to Catch Creation	Christina Anderson	Nataki Garrett	Thomas Theatre
2019	Macbeth	William Shakespeare	José Luis Valenzuela	Allen Elizabethan Theatre
2019	Alice In Wonderland	Eva Le Gallienne Florinda Friebus	Sara Bruner	Allen Elizabethan Theatre
2019	All's Well That Ends Well	William Shakespeare	Tracy Young	Allen Elizabethan Theatre
2019	La Comedy of Errors; A bilingual English & Spanish version of Comedy of Errors.	William Shakespeare adapted and translated by Luis Alfaro	Bill Rauch	Community Visit Project

== The 2020s ==
The Festival opened the 2020 season on February 28. On March 11, the COVID-19 pandemic forced the performances and remaining openings of all shows to be cancelled indefinitely. By the end of March, the Festival was hoping to present a smaller season that would open Labor Day weekend. The plan was to present the four shows that had already opened with the addition of Shakespeare's The Tempest in the outdoor Allen Elizabethan Theatre. On May 8, it became apparent that ongoing social distancing restrictions in Oregon would prohibit a fall season and all shows for 2020 were cancelled.

In February 2021, the Festival announced a hybrid season that would allow for flexibility surrounding ongoing social distancing mandates. The Festival offered month-long streaming access to archive videos of previous shows in the early part of the year on their newly-launched streaming platform, O!. The archive streams included Julius Caesar (2017 season), Manahatta (2018 season), and Snow in Midsummer (2018 season). Also announced were tentative plans for three fully-staged shows to open in the followed by OSF's first ever Christmas show. In later May 2021, the OSF announced they would be proceeding with only one play, Fannie: The Music and Life of Fannie Lou Hamer, a one woman show opening July 1 and playing through mid-October in the outdoor Allen Elizabethan Theatre. Concurrently, the outdoor theatre would also offer performances every Wednesday hosting performing groups typically featured in the Green Show. This press release also re-affirmed their plans for a Christmas show written by three members of their acting company titled It's Christmas, Carol!.

Year	Play	Playwright	Director	Theatre
2020	A Midsummer Night's Dream	William Shakespeare	Joseph Haj	Angus Bowmer Theatre
2020	The Copper Children	Karen Zacarías	Shariffa Ali	Angus Bowmer Theatre
2020	Peter and the Starcatcher	Rick Elice; Dave Barry and Ridley Pearson; Wayne Barker	Lavina Jadhwani	Angus Bowmer Theatre
2020	Bring Down the House (Parts 1 & 2); A two-part adaptation of Shakespeare's three Henry VI plays.	William Shakespeare; Rosa Joshi (adapter); Kate Wisniewski (adapter) & Upstart Crow Collective	Rosa Joshi	Thomas Theatre
2021	Fannie: The Music and Life of Fannie Lou Hamer	Cheryl L. West	Henry Godinez	Allen Elizabethan Theatre
2021	It's Christmas, Carol!	Mark Bedard; Brett Hinkley; John Tufts	Pirrone Yousefzadeh	Angus Bowmer Theatre
2022	Once On This Island	Lynn Ahrens; Stephen Flaherty	Lili-Anne Brown	Angus Bowmer Theatre
2022	How I Learned What I Learned	August Wilson	Tim Bond	Angus Bowmer Theatre
2022	King John	William Shakespeare	Rosa Joshi	Angus Bowmer Theatre
2022	It's Christmas Carol!	Mark Bedard; Brett Hinkley; John Tufts	Pirrone Yousefzadeh	Angus Bowmer Theatre
2022	Unseen	Mona Mansour	Evren Odcikin	Thomas Theatre
2022	Confederates	Dominique Morisseau	Nataki Garrett	Thomas Theatre
2022	The Tempest	William Shakespeare	Nicholas C. Avila	Allen Elizabethan Theatre
2022	Revenge Song	Qui Nguyen	Robert Ross Parker	Allen Elizabethan Theatre
2023	Romeo and Juliet	William Shakespeare	Nataki Garrett	Angus Bowmer Theatre
2023	Rent	Jonathan Larson	Tiffany Nichole Greene	Angus Bowmer Theatre
2023	It's Christmas Carol!	Mark Bedard; Brett Hinkley; John Tufts	Pirrone Yousefzadeh	Angus Bowmer Theatre
2023	The Three Musketeers	Alexandre Dumas; Kirsten Childs	Kent Gash	Allen Elizabethan Theatre
2023	Twelfth Night	William Shakespeare	Dawn Monique Williams	Allen Elizabethan Theatre
2023	Where We Belong	Madeline Sayet	Mei Ann Teo	Thomas Theatre
2024	Macbeth	William Shakespeare	Evren Odcikin	Angus Bowmer Theatre
2024	Born with Teeth	Liz Duffy Adams	Rob Melrose	Angus Bowmer Theatre
2024	Much Ado About Nothing	William Shakespeare	Miriam A. Laube	Allen Elizabethan Theatre
2024	Jane Eyre	Elizabeth Williamson	Dawn Monique William	Allen Elizabethan Theatre
2024	Shakespeare and the Alchemy of Gender	Lisa Wolpe	Laurie Woolery	Thomas Theatre
2024	Smote This, A Comedy About God... and Other Serious $H*T	Rodney Gardiner	Raz Golden	Thomas Theatre
2024	Virgins to Villains: My Journey with Shakespeare’s Women	Robin Goodrin Nordli	Penny Metropulos	Thomas Theatre
2024	Lizard Boy	Justin Huertas	Brandon Ivie	Thomas Theatre
2024	Coriolanus	William Shakespeare	Rosa Joshi	Thomas Theatre
2024	Behfarmaheen (If You Please)	Barzin Akhavan	Desdemona Chiang	Thomas Theatre
2025	Julius Caesar	William Shakespeare	Rosa Joshi	Angus Bowmer Theatre
2025	The Importance of Being Earnest	Oscar Wilde	Desdemona Chiang	Angus Bowmer Theatre
2025	August Wilson's Jitney	August Wilson	Tim Bond	Angus Bowmer Theatre
2025	Shane	Karen Zacarías Adapted from the novel by Jack Schaefer	Blake Robison	Angus Bowmer Theatre
2025	The Merry Wives of Windsor	William Shakespeare	Terri McMahon	Allen Elizabethan Theatre
2025	Into the Woods	James LaPine Stephen Sondheim	Amanda Dehnert	Allen Elizabethan Theatre
2025	Fat Ham	James Ijames	Elizabeth Carter	Thomas Theatre
2025	As You Like It	William Shakespeare	Lisa Peterson	Thomas Theatre
2025	Quixote Nuevo	Octavio Solis	Lisa Portes	Thomas Theatre
2026	A Midsummer Night's Dream	William Shakespeare	Marcela Lorca	Angus Bowmer Theatre
2026	Come From Away	Irene Sankoff David Hein	Laurie Woolery	Angus Bowmer Theatre
2026	A Raisin in the Sun	Lorraine Hansberry	Tim Bond	Angus Bowmer Theatre
2026	Yellow Face	David Henry Hwang	May Adrales	Angus Bowmer Theatre
2026	The Taming of the Shrew	William Shakespeare	Shana Cooper	Allen Elizabethan Theatre
2026	Henry IV, Part One	William Shakespeare	Rosa Joshi	Allen Elizabethan Theatre
2026	Emma	Kate Hamill Based on the novel by Jane Austen	Meredith McDonough	Allen Elizabethan Theatre
2026	You Are Cordially Invited to the End of the World!	Keiko Green	Zi Alikhan	Thomas Theatre
2026	August Wilson's King Hedley II	August Wilson	Tim Bond	Thomas Theatre
2026	Smote This, A Comedy About God...and Other Serious $H*T	Rodney Gardiner	Raz Golden	Thomas Theatre

== Cumulative Shakespeare canon productions ==
A list of the number of times the Oregon Shakespeare Festival has produced each of Shakespeare's plays is available below. It counts only main stage productions produced in Ashland and at OSF Portland.

The Festival has completed the canon of the first folio four times: the first time with Troilus and Cressida in 1958, and the remaining times with Timon of Athens in 1978, 1997, and 2016.

OSF Production History of Shakespeare's Plays
Play	Number	Seasons
Twelfth Night	18	1935, 1936, 1937, 1938, 1951, 1959, 1964, 1969, 1974, 1981, 1988, 1993, 1995, 2000, 2005, 2010, 2016, 2023
As You Like It	16	1939, 1940, 1950, 1957, 1962, 1968, 1973, 1979, 1980, 1986, 1992, 1997, 2002, 2007, 2012, 2019, 2025
Romeo and Juliet	15	1936, 1937, 1949, 1956, 1963, 1969, 1975, 1982, 1988, 1996, 2003, 2007, 2012, 2018, 2023
The Comedy of Errors	14	1939, 1940, 1950, 1962, 1970, 1976, 1982, 1990, 1994, 1998, 2004, 2008, 2014, 2019
The Taming of the Shrew	14	1937, 1938, 1939, 1949, 1953, 1960, 1967, 1972, 1978, 1984, 1991, 2000, 2007, 2013, 2026
The Merchant of Venice	14	1935, 1936, 1938, 1947, 1948, 1953, 1958, 1964, 1970, 1977, 1985, 1991, 2001, 2010
Much Ado About Nothing	14	1940, 1952, 1958, 1965, 1971, 1976, 1983, 1989, 1994, 1999, 2004, 2009, 2015, 2024
A Midsummer Night's Dream	13	1949, 1955, 1961, 1966, 1971, 1979, 1987, 1993, 1998, 2003, 2008, 2013, 2020, 2026
Hamlet	12	1938, 1939, 1947, 1954, 1961, 1968, 1974, 1983, 1994, 2000, 2010, 2016
Othello	11	1948, 1949, 1957, 1966, 1973, 1981, 1982, 1992, 1999, 2008, 2018
Love's Labour's Lost	11	1947, 1948, 1956, 1963, 1972, 1980, 1988, 1996, 2005, 2011, 2018
The Tempest	11	1952, 1960, 1969, 1978, 1986, 1991, 1994, 2001, 2007, 2014, 2022
Macbeth	11	1947, 1955, 1965, 1971, 1979, 1987, 1995, 2002, 2009, 2019, 2024
The Merry Wives of Windsor	10	1940, 1954, 1963, 1973, 1980, 1990, 1995, 2001, 2006, 2017, 2025
The Winter's Tale	9	1954, 1965, 1975, 1984, 1990, 1996, 2002, 2006, 2016
King Lear	9	1951, 1958, 1964, 1976, 1985, 1992, 1997, 2004, 2013
Henry V	8	1952, 1963, 1973, 1982, 1990, 2000, 2012, 2018
Julius Caesar	8	1952, 1960, 1970, 1982, 1991, 2002, 2011, 2017, 2025
Henry IV, Part 1	8	1950, 1961, 1971, 1981, 1988, 1998, 2010, 2017, 2026
Richard II	8	1949, 1960, 1970, 1980, 1987, 1995, 2003, 2016
The Two Gentlemen of Verona	8	1957, 1966, 1974, 1981, 1989, 1997, 2006, 2014
All's Well That Ends Well	7	1955, 1961, 1975, 1985, 1992, 2009, 2019
Henry IV, Part 2	7	1951, 1962, 1972, 1989, 1999, 2011, 2017
Antony and Cleopatra	7	1950, 1959, 1967, 1977, 1993, 2003, 2015
Richard III	7	1956, 1967, 1978, 1983, 1993, 2005, 2014
Henry VI, Part 1	6	1953, 1964, 1975, 1991, 2004, 2020
Henry VI, Part 2	6	1954, 1965, 1976, 1991 and 92, 2004, 2020
Henry VI, Part 3	6	1955, 1966, 1977, 1992, 2004, 2020
Cymbeline	6	1956, 1968, 1983, 1993, 1998, 2013
Measure for Measure	6	1951, 1959, 1977, 1986, 1998, 2011
King John	6	1948, 1959, 1969, 1985, 2006, 2022
Coriolanus	6	1953, 1962, 1980, 1996, 2008, 2024
Pericles, Prince of Tyre*	5	1957, 1967, 1989, 1999, 2015
Troilus and Cressida	5	1958, 1972, 1984, 2001, 2012
Timon of Athens	4	1955, 1978, 1997, 2016
Henry VIII	4	1957, 1968, 1984, 2009
Titus Andronicus	4	1956, 1974, 1986, 2002
The Two Noble Kinsmen*	1	1994

*indicates shows not part of the First Folio canon.

== Venues ==
- Allen Elizabethan Theatre (Elizabethan Theatre, Elizabethan Stage)
- Angus Bowmer Theatre
- Black Swan Theatre
- Thomas Theatre (The New Theatre)
- Lithia Theatre
- Varsity Theatre
- Tao House (Danville, California)
- Portland Center Stage (OSF Portland)
- Kennedy Center
- Bill Patton Garden (for Act 2 of 2011's Ghost Light)
