= Fingersmith =

Fingersmith may refer to:

- Fingersmith (novel), a 2002 crime fiction novel by Sarah Waters
  - Fingersmith (TV serial), a 2005 BBC mini-series based on the novel
  - Fingersmith (play), a 2015 American stage adaptation of the novel
  - The Handmaiden, a 2016 South Korean film thriller by Park Chan-Wook, adapted from the novel
- "Finger Smith", title of a song from the Boombastic album by rapper Shaggy

== See also ==
- Finger (disambiguation)
- Smith (disambiguation)
