= All the Way (play) =

2012 play by Robert Schenkkan

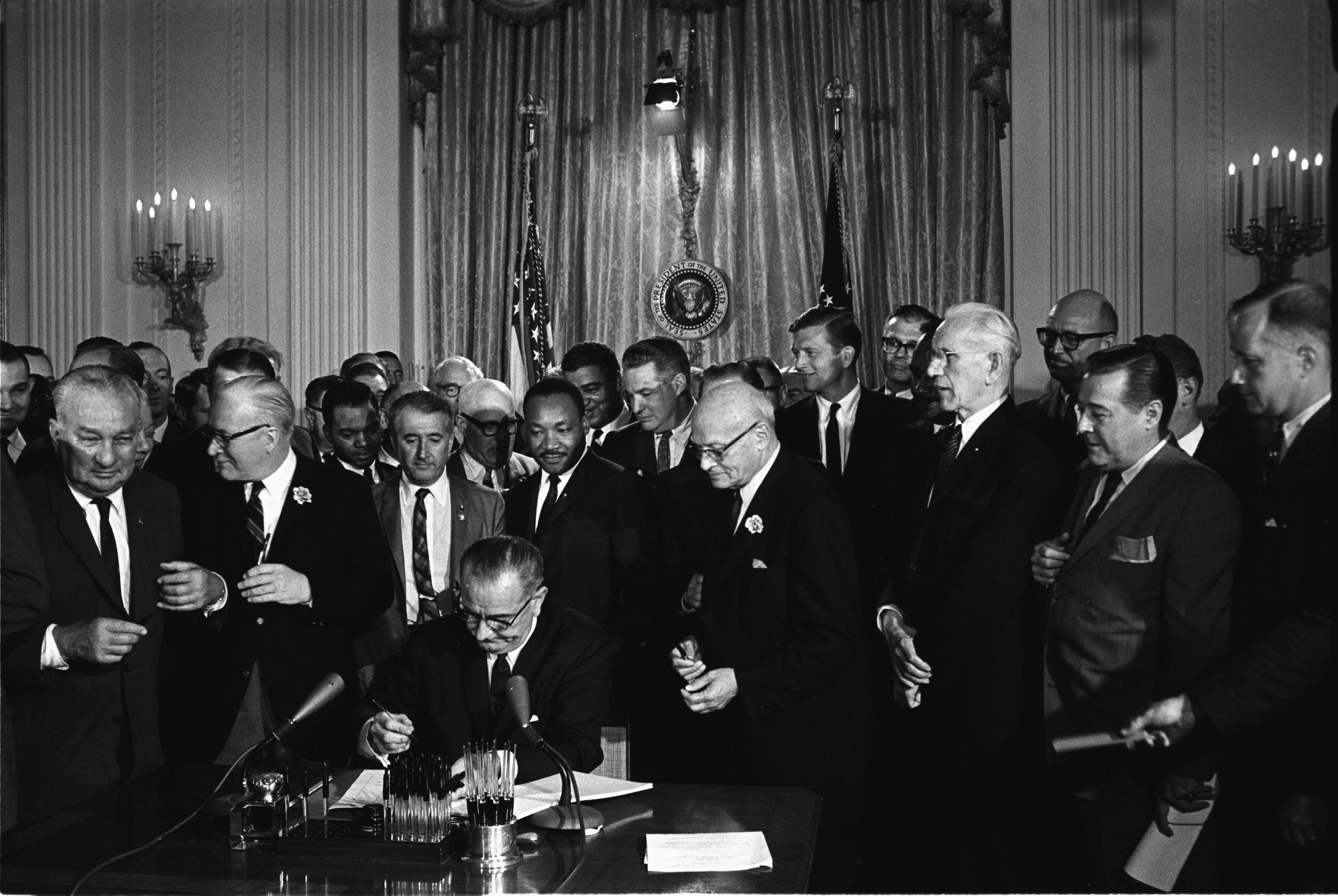
- Johnson signing the Civil Rights Act of 1964
- Original language: English
- Written by: Robert Schenkkan
- Characters: Lyndon B. Johnson; Lady Bird Johnson; Martin Luther King Jr.; Hubert Humphrey; J. Edgar Hoover; Richard Russell
- Series: American Revolutions: The United States History Cycle
- Subject: Politics
- Genre: Drama
- Setting: Washington, D.C., Atlantic City, Mississippi, Atlanta, November 1963 to November 1964

Premiere
- Date: July 28, 2012
- Place: Oregon Shakespeare Festival

All the Way is a play by Robert Schenkkan, depicting President Lyndon B. Johnson's efforts to maneuver members of the 88th United States Congress to enact, and civil rights leaders including Martin Luther King Jr. to support, the Civil Rights Act of 1964. The play takes its name from Johnson's 1964 campaign slogan, "All the Way with LBJ."

The play was commissioned by the Oregon Shakespeare Festival and premiered there in 2012, in a production directed by Bill Rauch, with Jack Willis originating the role of LBJ. It premiered on Broadway in March 2014, in a production also directed by Rauch, which won the 2014 Tony Award and Drama Desk Award for Outstanding Play. Bryan Cranston won the Tony Award for Best Actor in a Play for his performance. The play was published in 2014.

== History ==
All the Way was commissioned by the Oregon Shakespeare Festival (OSF) as part of its "American Revolutions: The United States History Cycle." It premiered at OSF on July 28, 2012, directed by Bill Rauch, with Jack Willis originating the role of LBJ.

A reading of All the Way was held in January 2013 at Seattle Repertory Theatre, as part of the theater's New Play Festival. It was paired with The Great Society, also by Robert Schenkkan

The play was produced in September 2013, at the American Repertory Theater (A.R.T.) in Cambridge, Massachusetts, directed by Rauch, with Bryan Cranston as LBJ. The A.R.T. production premiered on Broadway at the Neil Simon Theatre for a limited run on March 6, 2014, where it ran through until June 29, 2014.

The Broadway and A.R.T. productions starred Bryan Cranston as LBJ, and the cast included John McMartin, Betsy Aidem, Christopher Liam Moore, Robert Petkoff, Brandon J. Dirden, Michael McKean, and Bill Timoney.

The play sold out its American Repertory Theater showing, and strong sales were reported for previews of its limited Broadway run at the Neil Simon Theatre. The play, produced by Jeffrey Richards, Louise Gund and Jerry Frankel, grossed over $1.6 million in ticket sales in its final week, a record at the time. On June 5, 2014, the producers announced that the play had recouped its $3.9 million investment in under four months.

All the Way is the first of two plays by Schenkkan on Johnson's presidency. The second part, The Great Society, premiered at the OSF on July 27, 2014. Jack Willis, who played Johnson at its Oregon premiere, again plays Johnson in The Great Society in Oregon. The sequel, also directed by Rauch, continues the Johnson story from 1964 to 1968.

== Synopsis ==
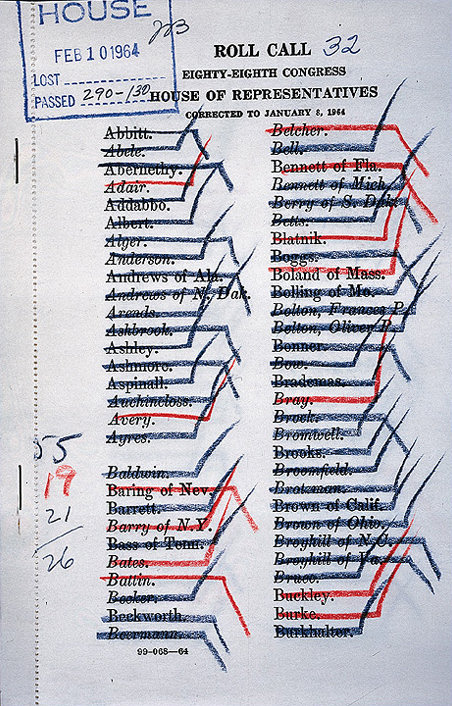
House roll call for the Civil Rights Act of 1964

The play opens shortly after the assassination of John F. Kennedy on November 22, 1963, and continues through Johnson's landslide election on November 3, 1964. In his first year as president, Johnson engineers passage of the Civil Rights Act of 1964. Johnson has Senator Hubert Humphrey of Minnesota reach out to liberal congressmen and civil rights groups, while Johnson personally deals with Southern congressmen, who are deeply opposed to the legislation. The act has trouble getting passed through the United States Senate more than the U.S House of Representatives. Among the opposition to the Civil Rights Act of 1964 were senators Strom Thurmond and James Eastland. Their opposing views seemed to be complicated to manipulate causing the Civil Rights Act some trouble getting passed and off the Senate floor. At the end of Act One, eventually the law passes the Senate, by Johnson's use of cajolery, arm-twisting, and blackmail to get his way. Johnson himself is from the South, he is close to the recalcitrant southern congressmen, and he uses homespun and sometimes off-color stories to persuade them. A reviewer noted, "Johnson seems just to be shooting the breeze when really he's riding herd on friend and foe alike in anxious pursuit of his goals." Throughout, the play makes copious reference to congressional terminology unusual in Broadway plays, such as "cloture" and "filibuster," which are mechanisms used to extract bills from committees or even stall the bill from being voted on.

Johnson is portrayed as emotionally needy and vulnerable, even as he rides roughshod over other people such as his wife, Lady Bird Johnson, and his longtime aide, Walter Jenkins, who is forced to resign after he is arrested on morals charge. He is disdainful of Humphrey and promises the vice-presidency to him in the 1964 elections if he goes all the way with Johnson.

Johnson engages in spirited conversations with Senator Richard Russell Jr. of Georgia, who strongly opposes the legislation but finds that his ability to stop the bill has ebbed because of Johnson's tactics.

On the other side, Dr. Martin Luther King Jr. must contend with more conservative leaders, such as Roy Wilkins, who oppose civil rights marches and militant leaders like Stokely Carmichael, who favor strong action. The more activist leaders prevail, and launch the "Freedom Summer;" young college students ride buses into the south to desegregate facilities. Three Freedom Riders (Michael Schwerner, Andrew Goodman and James Chaney) are killed allegedly by police brutality, forcing Johnson to send in the FBI and further inflaming emotions. J. Edgar Hoover is shown eavesdropping on Dr. King.

In the second act, the action shifts to Atlantic City, New Jersey, where a battle is brewing at the 1964 Democratic National Convention. The segregated Mississippi delegation is challenged by the integrated Mississippi Freedom Democratic Party (MFDP). Outside of the Democratic Convention is the MFDP activist and leader demanding a seat in the convention that would integrate the votes. Fannie Lou Hamer one of the MFDP leaders tells her story on national television of her mistreatment by the Winona Chief Police county jail that would provoke the MFDP to get a seat at the convention. Johnson struggles on creating a strategy that would make both the MFDP and the primary party voters satisfied. Thirty-three days until the election Johnson and Barry Goldwater scores are head to head to win the presidential seat.

== Themes ==
Schenkkan describes All the Way as a play about "the morality of politics and power. Where do you draw the line in terms of intentions and action. How much leeway does a good intention give you to violate the law?"

The play's set is a semi-circular dais surrounding the central portion of the stage. The New York Observer said that the surrounding seats "serve as Congressional hearing rooms, and as spots for ever-present observers to sit and watch, but mostly they render the stage a coliseum, with everything that happens a battle, or maybe a courtroom: L.B.J. is always on trial."

Unlike previous dramatic depictions of Johnson, such as Barbara Garson's satirical 1967 play MacBird!, Johnson is portrayed sympathetically. Writing in The New York Times, Sam Tanenhaus said that All the Way portrays Johnson "as something far more interesting and even inspiring: the last and perhaps greatest of all legislative presidents, with his wizardly grip on the levers of governance at a time when it was still possible for deals to be brokered and favors swapped and for combatants to clash in an atmosphere of respect, if not smiling concord."

The play reveals the discrimination against African-Americans that sparked the creation of the 1964 Civil Rights Act. It portrays a new era that sparked in America that would promote integration, and equal opportunities to African-Americans. The play also revealed the process the United States Congress undergoes to pass any bills being presented.

== Broadway production ==
In preparing for the role, Cranston sought to meet Robert Caro, author of a multipart biography of Johnson (The Years of Lyndon Johnson). But Caro refused, telling The New York Times: "I didn't want to see someone playing Lyndon Johnson or talk to the actor playing him because I was afraid that image would become blurred for me. The better the actor the more danger there would be that that would happen."

=== Cast ===
- Lyndon B. Johnson, played by Bryan Cranston
- Lady Bird Johnson/Katharine Graham, played by Betsy Aidem
- Walter Jenkins, played by Christopher Liam Moore
- Hubert Humphrey, played by Robert Petkoff
- Richard Russell, played by John McMartin
- Martin Luther King, played by Brandon J. Dirden
- J. Edgar Hoover, played by Michael McKean
- Governor George Wallace, played by Rob Campbell
- Stanley Levison/John McCormack, played by Ethan Phillips
- Karl Mundt, played by Bill Timoney

== Reception ==
The Broadway production received generally favorable reviews, with Bryan Cranston's performance singled out for praise.

Writing in The New York Times, Charles Isherwood called All the Way a "dense but mostly absorbing drama, set during the tense first year of Johnson's presidency following the assassination of President John F. Kennedy." Isherwood praised Cranston as Johnson, saying his "heat-generating performance galvanizes the production. Even when Johnson is offstage or the writing sags with exposition, the show, directed solidly by Bill Rauch, retains the vitalizing imprint of his performance." Other characters such as Hoover and George Wallace are "merely sketched in," and the play "sorely needs streamlining." In his review of the American Repertory Theater production, also starring Cranston, Isherwood said the play "ultimately accrues minimal dramatic momentum."

The Broadway production was called "juicy" by the Chicago Tribune, which said that Cranston "offers up a restless, hypnotically intense physicality coupled with an intimately forged vulnerability." It said that the lead actor "does not disappoint for a moment, driving the show with a truly riveting life-force and, it seems, painting every up and down in this insecure but notably self-aware president's life on his visage, which he seems to pull and stretch in limitless directions. "

Variety called All the Way a "jaw-dropping political drama" and a "beautifully built dramatic piece," while New York's Daily News said that the play was "talky but terrifically acted."

== Awards and nominations ==
=== 2013 Boston production ===
Year	Award ceremony	Category	Nominee	Result	Ref.
2013	American Theatre Critics Association Award	Harold and Mimi Steinberg/ATCA New Play Award	Robert Schenkkan	Won	

=== 2014 Broadway production ===
Year	Award ceremony	Category	Nominee	Result
2014	Tony Award	Best Play	Robert Schenkkan	Won
2014	Tony Award	Best Actor in a Play	Bryan Cranston	Won
2014	Drama Desk Award	Outstanding Play	Robert Schenkkan	Won
2014	Drama Desk Award	Outstanding Actor in a Play	Bryan Cranston	Won
2014	Drama Desk Award	Outstanding Director of a Play	Bill Rauch	Nominated
2014	Drama Desk Award	Outstanding Sound Design of a Play	Paul James Prendergast	Nominated
2014	Drama Desk Award	Outstanding Projection Design	Shawn Sagady	Nominated
2014	Outer Critics Circle Award	Outstanding New Broadway Play		Won
2014	Outer Critics Circle Award	Outstanding Actor in a Play	Bryan Cranston	Won
2014	Outer Critics Circle Award	Outstanding Featured Actor in a Play	John McMartin	Nominated
2014	Outer Critics Circle Award	Outstanding Director of a Play	Bill Rauch	Nominated
2014	New York Drama Critics' Circle Award	Best American Play	Robert Schenkkan	Won
2014	Drama League Award	Outstanding Production of a Play		Won
2014	Theatre World Award		Bryan Cranston	Won

== Film adaptation ==
A television film based on the play starring Cranston, written by Schenkkan, and directed by Jay Roach premiered on HBO on May 21, 2016.

== See also ==
- Civil rights movement in popular culture
- The Years of Lyndon Johnson, biography series by Robert Caro
