= Fingersmith (novel) =

2002 historical crime novel by Sarah Waters

- First edition
- Author: Sarah Waters
- Language: English
- Genre: Crime novel, historical fiction, gothic fiction
- Publisher: Virago Press
- Publication date: 4 February 2002
- Publication place: United Kingdom
- Media type: Print (Hardback & paperback)
- Pages: 511 pp
- ISBN: 1-86049-882-5
- OCLC: 48235549

Fingersmith is a 2002 historical crime novel set in Victorian-era Britain, written by the Welsh novelist Sarah Waters.

== Plot summary ==
=== Part one ===
Sue Trinder, an orphan raised in "a Fagin-like den of thieves" by her adoptive mother, Mrs Sucksby, is sent to help Richard "Gentleman" Rivers seduce a wealthy heiress. Posing as a maid, Sue is to gain the trust of the lady, Maud Lilly, and eventually persuade her to elope with Gentleman. Once they are married, Gentleman plans to commit Maud to a madhouse and claim her fortune for himself.

Sue travels to Briar, Maud's secluded home in the country, where she lives a sheltered life under the care of her uncle, Christopher Lilly. Like Sue, Maud was orphaned at birth; her mother died in a mental asylum, and she has never known her father. Her uncle uses her as a secretary to assist him as he supposedly compiles a dictionary, and keeps her to the house, working with him in the silence of his library.

Sue and Maud forge an unlikely friendship, which develops into a mutual physical attraction. After a time, Sue realises she has fallen in love with Maud, and begins to regret her involvement in Gentleman's plot. Deeply distressed, but feeling she has no choice, Sue persuades Maud to marry Gentleman, and the trio flee from Briar to a nearby church, where Maud and Gentleman are hastily married in a midnight ceremony.

Making a temporary home in a local cottage, and telling Maud they are simply waiting for their affairs to be brought to order in London, Gentleman and a reluctant Sue make arrangements for Maud to be committed to an asylum for the insane. Her health has already waned as a result of the shock of leaving her quiet life at Briar, to Gentleman's delight. After a week, he and Sue escort an oblivious Maud to the asylum in a closed carriage. However, the doctors apprehend Sue on arrival, and from the cold reactions of Gentleman and the seemingly innocent Maud, Sue guesses that it is she who has been conned.

=== Part two ===
In the second part of the novel, Maud takes over the narrative. She describes her early life being raised by the nurses in the mental asylum where her mother died, and the sudden appearance of her uncle, who arrives when she is eleven to take her to Briar to be his secretary.

Her induction into his rigid way of life is brutal; Maud is made to wear gloves constantly to preserve the surfaces of the books she is working on, and is denied food when she tires of labouring with her uncle in his library. Distressed, and missing her previous home, Maud begins to demonstrate sadistic tendencies, biting and kicking her maid, Agnes, and her abusive carer, Mrs Stiles. She harbours a deep resentment toward her mother for abandoning her, and starts holding her mother's locket every night, and whispering to it how much she hates her.

Shockingly, Maud reveals that her uncle's work is not to compile a dictionary, but to assemble a bibliography of literary pornography, for the reference of future generations. In his own words, Christopher Lilly is a 'curator of poisons.' He introduces Maud to the keeping of the books—indexing them and such—when she is barely twelve, and deadens her reactions to the shocking material. As she grows older, Maud reads the material aloud for the appreciation of her uncle's colleagues. On one occasion, when asked by one of them how she can stand to curate such things, Maud answers, "I was bred to the task, as servants are."

She has resigned herself to a life serving her uncle's obscure ambition when Richard Rivers arrives at Briar. He reveals to her a plan to help her escape her exile in Briar, a plan involving the deception of a commonplace girl who will believe she has been sent to Briar to trick Maud out of her inheritance. After initial hesitation, Maud agrees to the plan and receives her new maid, Sue, weeks later, pretending to know nothing about the plot.

Maud falls in love with Sue over time and, like Sue, begins to question whether she will be able to carry out Gentleman's plot. Though overcome with guilt, Maud does, and travels with Gentleman to London after committing Sue to the asylum, claiming to the doctors that Sue was the mad Mrs Maud Rivers who believed she was her own maid.

Instead of taking Maud to a house in Chelsea, as he had promised, Gentleman takes her to Mrs Sucksby in the Borough. It was, it turns out, Gentleman's plan to bring her here all along; and, Mrs Sucksby, who had orchestrated the entire plan, reveals to a stunned Maud that Marianne Lilly had come to Lant Street seventeen years earlier, pregnant and alone. When Marianne discovered her cruel father and brother had found her, she begged Mrs Sucksby to take her newborn child and give her one of her 'farmed' infants to take its place. Sue, it turns out, was Marianne Lilly's true daughter, and Maud one of the many orphaned infants who had been placed in Mrs Sucksby's care after being abandoned. Marianne revises her will on the night of the switch, entitling each of the two girls to half of Marianne Lilly's fortune. By having Sue committed, Mrs Sucksby could intercept one share; by keeping Maud a prisoner, she could take the other half. She had planned the switch of the two girls for seventeen years, and enlisted the help of Gentleman to bring Maud to her in the months before Sue's eighteenth birthday, when she would become legally entitled to the money. By setting Sue up as the 'mad Mrs Rivers', Gentleman could, by law, claim her fortune for himself.

Alone and friendless, Maud has no choice but to remain a prisoner at Lant Street. She makes one attempt to escape to the home of one of her uncle's friends, Mr Hawtrey, but he turns her away, appalled at the scandal that she has fallen into, and eager to preserve his own reputation. Maud returns to Lant Street and finally submits to the care of Mrs Sucksby. It is then that Mrs Sucksby reveals to her that Maud was not an orphan that she took into her care, as she and Gentleman had told her, but Mrs Sucksby's own daughter.

=== Part three ===
The novel resumes Sue's narrative, picking up where Maud and Gentleman had left her in the mental asylum. Sue is devastated at Maud's betrayal and furious that Gentleman double-crossed her. When she screams to the asylum doctors that she is not Mrs Rivers but her maid Susan, they ignore her, as Gentleman (helped by Maud) has convinced them that this is precisely her delusion, and that she is really Maud Lilly Rivers, his troubled wife.

Sue is treated appallingly by the nurses in the asylum, being subjected to beatings and taunts on a regular basis. Such is her maltreatment and loneliness that, after a time, she begins to fear that she truly has gone mad. She is sustained by the belief that Mrs Sucksby will find and rescue her. Sue dwells on Maud's betrayal, the devastation of which quickly turns to anger.

Sue's chance at freedom comes when Charles, a knife-boy from Briar, comes to visit her. He is the son of Mr Way and, it turns out, the nephew of Mrs Cream. Charles, a simple boy, has been pining for the charming attentions of Gentleman to such an extent that Mr Way, the warden of Briar, had begun to beat him severely. Charles runs away, and has been directed to the asylum by Mrs Cream, who has no idea of the nature of the place.

With Charles' recognition of her helping, Sue accepts her own memories as fact. She quickly enlists his help in her escape, persuading him to purchase a blank key and a file to give to her on his next visit. This he does, and Sue, using the skills learnt growing up in the Borough, escapes from the asylum and travels with Charles to London, with the intention of returning to Mrs Sucksby and her home in Lant Street.

On arrival, an astonished Sue sees Maud at her bedroom window. After days of watching the activity of her old home from a nearby boarding house, Sue sends Charles with a letter explaining all to Mrs Sucksby, still believing that it was Maud and Gentleman alone who deceived her. Charles returns, saying Maud intercepted the letter, and sent Sue a playing card – the Two of Hearts, representing lovers – in reply. Sue takes the token as a joke, and storms into the house to confront Maud, half-mad with rage. She tells everything to Mrs Sucksby, who pretends to have known nothing, and despite Mrs Sucksby's repeated attempts to calm her, swears she will kill Maud for what she has done to her. Gentleman arrives, and though initially shocked at Sue's escape, laughingly begins to tell Sue how Mrs Sucksby played her for a fool. Maud physically tries to stop him, knowing how the truth would devastate Sue; a scuffle between Maud, Gentleman and Mrs Sucksby ensues, and in the confusion, Gentleman is stabbed by the knife Sue had brought with her to kill Maud. He bleeds to death. A hysterical Charles alerts the police. Mrs Sucksby, at last sorry for how she has deceived the two girls, immediately confesses to the murder: "Lord knows, I'm sorry for it now; but I done it. And these girls here are innocent girls, and know nothing at all about it; and have harmed no-one."

Mrs Sucksby is hanged for killing Gentleman; it is revealed that Richard Rivers was not a shamed gentleman at all, but a draper's son named Frederick Bunt, who had had ideas above his station. Maud disappears, though Sue sees her briefly at Mrs Sucksby's trial and gathers from the prison matrons that Maud had been visiting Mrs Sucksby in the days leading up to her death. Sue remains unaware of her true parentage until she finds the will of Marianne Lilly tucked in the folds of Mrs Sucksby's gown. Realising everything, an overwhelmed Sue sets out to find Maud, beginning by returning to Briar. It is there she finds Maud, and the nature of Christopher Lilly's work is finally revealed to Sue. It is further revealed that Maud is now writing erotic fiction to sustain herself financially, publishing her stories in The Pearl, a pornographic magazine run by one of her uncle's friends in London, William Lazenby. The two girls, still very much in love with each other despite everything, make peace and give vent to their feelings at last.

== Characters ==
- Susan Trinder - The protagonist of the novel
- Maud Lilly - The heiress whom Sue plans to defraud
- Richard 'Gentleman' Rivers - Partner in crime to both Sue and Maud
- Mrs Sucksby - Adoptive mother of Sue; Maud's real mother
- Mr Ibbs - The crooked pawn seller who runs the 'den of thieves' with Mrs Sucksby
- Christopher Lilly - Maud's 'uncle', in reality Sue's uncle; brother of Marianne Lilly
- Dainty - Sue's best friend in Lant Street; a petty thief and close friend of John Vroom
- John Vroom - An ill-tempered boy; also a petty thief
- Mrs Stiles - Maud's childhood carer; a bitter woman who never recovered from the loss of her own daughter
- Charles Way - A knife boy at Briar, who becomes enamoured with Gentleman
- Mr Way - A servant at Briar; father of Charles
- Agnes - Maud's long-suffering maid, who is seduced by Gentleman in order to make a post available for Sue
- Marianne Lilly - Susan's mother, whom Maud believed to be hers; her father and brother had her committed to an asylum after giving birth, where she died
- Mrs Cream - The owner of the cottage in which Gentleman and Maud stayed, on the night of their elopement, along with Sue; Charles' aunt.
- Dr Christie - Head doctor at the mental asylum where Sue is kept
- Nurse Spiller - One of the asylum's nurses who is particularly cruel to Sue
- Nurse Bacon - The ward nurse at the asylum who is more lazy than cruel

== Lesbian and feminist themes ==
The book is notable for its eroticism and depiction of pornography. Reviewers have praised Waters' negotiation of sexual themes; a review from The Guardian describes it as "erotic and unnerving", while The New York Times praises its "illicit undertow".

Literary critics have also focused on the novel's sexual themes, and identified its engagement with debates surrounding feminism and pornography. In Fingersmith, Waters uses her depiction of lesbian love between Maud and Sue to challenge a variety of hetero-patriarchal norms, and respond to different feminist arguments about pornography. Outside of discussions about sexuality, the struggles that Maud and Sue both face as women in Victorian society, and their often exploitative relationships with men are also of interest to feminist critics.

The novel's title is likely intended to reflect the erotic themes of the novel. Fingersmith is an archaic term for a petty thief, but given the content of the novel, it can also be assumed to have intentionally sexual connotations.

Waters is known for writing lesbian fiction, and is a lesbian herself.

== Allusions/references to other works ==
- In her Notes on the Text, Waters informs the reader that the book Christopher Lilly and Maud are working on is actually based on bibliographies published by Henry Spencer Ashbee, under the pseudonym Pisanus Fraxi, in the late 1870s. Waters makes it clear, however, that though Lilly's sentiments on bookkeeping echo those of Ashbee, he is in all other aspects entirely fictitious.
- Waters also states in the Notes that all of the texts cited by Maud in Fingersmith actually existed, and lists their titles accordingly.

== Awards and honours ==
- Shortlisted for the Orange Prize
- Shortlisted for the Man Booker Prize
- Winner of the CWA Historical Dagger for Historical Crime Fiction

== Adaptations ==
The novel has been adapted for television, the stage and as a film.

Fingersmith, a BBC TV adaptation, was broadcast in 2005. Its cast included Sally Hawkins as Susan Trinder, Elaine Cassidy as Maud Lilly, Imelda Staunton as Mrs Sucksby, and Rupert Evans as Gentleman.

Alexa Junge wrote a stage adaptation (also titled Fingersmith) that premiered in March 2015 at the Oregon Shakespeare Festival in Ashland, Oregon. It starred Erica Sullivan as Maud, Sara Bruner as Sue, Elijah Alexander as Gentleman and Peter Frechette as Chris Lilly. The play had its New England premiere at the American Repertory Theater in December 2016. It was directed by Bill Rauch, and star Tracee Chimo as Sue, Christina Bennett Lind as Maud Lilly, Kristine Nielsen as Mrs Sucksby, and T. Ryder Smith as Christopher Lilly.

The South Korean director Park Chan-wook created a film adaptation titled, The Handmaiden (Korean title Agassi), set in 1930s colonial Korea and starring Ha Jung-woo, Kim Min-hee, Cho Jin-woong and Kim Tae-ri. The film ended production on 31 October 2015, and was released at the 2016 Cannes Film Festival. The film received critical acclaim and was a box office success.

== Censorship ==
In April 2025, the Minister of Information of Belarus added the book to a national blacklist of printed publications whose distribution could harm the national interests of Belarus.
