= Timothy Bond (professor) =

American theater director

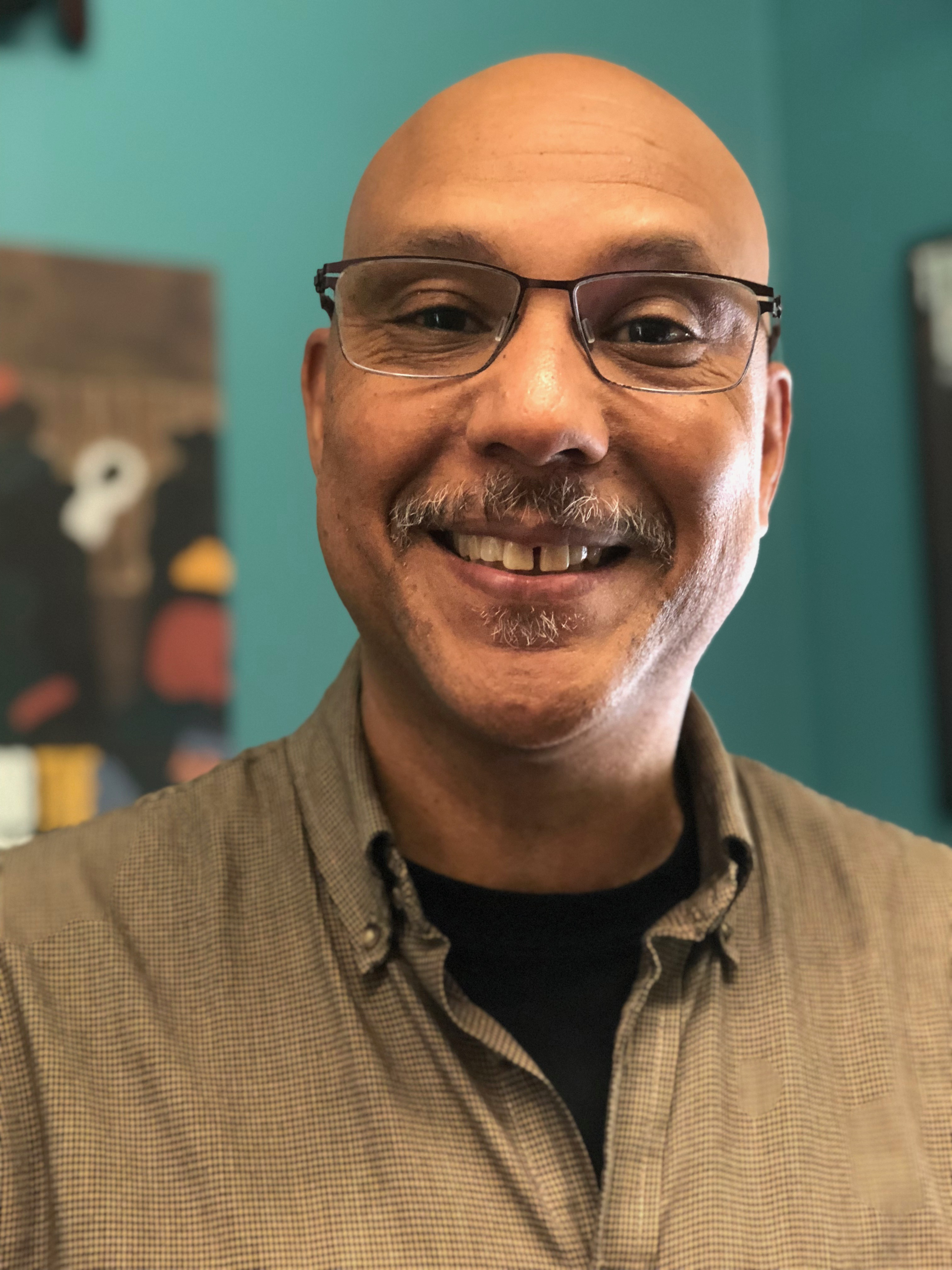
Tim Bond

Timothy Bond is the Artistic Director of the Oregon Shakespeare Festival as of September 1, 2023. His previous role was as the Head of the Professional Actor Training Program and professor at the University of Washington School of Drama.

== Career ==
From 2007 to 2016, Tim Bond served as Producing Artistic Director at Syracuse Stage and the Syracuse University Department of Drama. During his time at Syracuse, he directed 15 productions. He completed his tenure there with productions of To Kill a Mockingbird and The Christians.

From 1996 to 2007, Tim Bond was an Associate Artistic Director of Oregon Shakespeare Festival (OSF). He was the first artist of color to serve in an executive artistic position at OSF. OSF Artistic Director Libby Appel called Bond "an articulate and brilliant spokesperson for the theater, (who) possesses the unique ability to bring diverse experiences and cultures together to create a rich theatrical experience."

From 1991 to 1996, Tim Bond was an artistic director of The Seattle Group Theatre, where he started as Literary Manager and Associate Artistic Director. He directed over 20 productions during 13 seasons at the Group.

Bond is a frequent interpreter of the late playwright August Wilson, who he knew and worked with during Wilson's life. He has directed seven of the ten plays in Wilson's Century Cycle. Wilson's widow, costume designer Constanza Romero, who also executes Wilson's literary estate, often recommends Bond to direct Wilson's plays.

Tim Bond has worked with many prestigious theatre companies nationally and internationally, such as Seattle Repertory Theatre and The Baxter Theater in South Africa. Bond also has a strong connection with educational institutions. He was a guest instructor at the University of Washington and University of Wisconsin-Madison. He also directed at Cornish College of the Arts and the Juilliard Drama School. In the fall of 2016, Tim Bond was hired as a full professor at the University of Washington. He teaches in both the undergraduate curriculum, and the MFA directing and acting programs. Tim Bond now is the head of the Professional Actor Training Program (PATP) at UW.

Tim Bond completed his Bachelor of Fine Arts in Drama from Howard University and received his Master of Fine Arts in Directing from the University of Washington.

== Awards and recognition ==
Tim Bond received a Catalyst for Racial Justice Award in February 2016 from Syracuse Interfaith Works. During his time at Oregon Shakespeare Festival, he received Backstage West's Garland Awards for Outstanding Direction and Best Production for Les Blancs (1998) and Blues for an Alabama Sky (1997). Moreover, he advocated diversity for the next generation of artists by developing FAIR program.

== Research and creative work ==
- Guess Who's Coming to Dinner (2018 by Todd Kreidler based on the screenplay Guess Who's Coming to Dinner by William Rose) - director at Guthrie Theater
- By the Way, Meet Vera Stark (2017 by Lynn Nottage) - director at UW School of Drama
- Seattle Theatres Lost & Founded – attendee, in partnership w/ UW School of Drama and One Coast Collaboration
- The Christians (2016 by Lucas Hnath) – director, co-produced with Syracuse Stage. at Wilma Theater
- The Piano Lesson (2015 by August Wilson) – director, co-produced with Syracuse Stage. at Seattle Repertory Theatre
- The Brothers Size (2012 by Tarell Alvin McCraney) – director. at Storch Theatre Syracuse Stage
- Two Train Running (2013 by August Wilson) – director. at Archbold Theater Syracuse Stage
- The Boy Next Door (2011 by Tom Griffin) – director. at Archbold Theater, Syracuse Stage
- Fences (2010 by August Wilson) – director. at Seattle Repertory Theatre
- The Diary of Anne Frank (2009 by Frances Goodrich and Albert Hackett) – director. at Archbold Theater Syracuse Stage
- Ma Rainey's Black Bottom (2008 by August Wilson) – director. at Archbold Theater Syracuse Stage
- Blues for an Alabama Sky (1999 by Pearl Cleage) – director. at The Arizona Theatre Company
