= Amanda Dehnert =

American theater director and professor

Amanda Dehnert is an American regional theater director and professor at Northwestern University.

== Career ==
Dehnert grew up in Illinois and graduated from Illinois Wesleyan University with a degree in musical theater. She received training as a concert pianist as child and also learned to play the French horn, flute, trumpet and harpsichord, but in college she discovered musical theater. In 1994, at the age of 21, Dehnert entered Trinity Repertory Company's conservatory program in Providence, Rhode Island as a student. She performed there as a musician before becoming a musical director, and later was put in charge of a production.

Some of the shows she staged for Trinity Rep were West Side Story, A Moon for the Misbegotten, The Skin of Our Teeth, Peter Pan, Noises Off, Who's Afraid of Virginia Woolf?, My Fair Lady, Othello and Saint Joan. Iris Fanger wrote that "Audiences have applauded [Dehnert's] ingenuity in setting George Bernard Shaw's "St. Joan" in a neighborhood garage and the entire West Side Story in the high school gym, mixing up the Jets and the Sharks to emphasize their commonalities." In 1999, Dehnert became associate artistic director of the company.

In 2003, working for Trinity Rep, Dehnert directed a production of Annie. Early in its run, the production included a reworked ending in which Annie wakes to find that the positive events that happened to her throughout the show, including being adopted by billionaire Oliver Warbucks, were all part of a dream. Charles Strouse, who wrote the music for Annie, also saw the production and was impressed, which prompted him to approach Dehnert to produce his new musical, You Never Know. The play had its world premiere at Trinity Rep in April 2005.

In 2005, Dehnert became acting artistic director after Oskar Eustis moved on to become artistic director of The Public Theater in New York City.

== Recognition ==
In 2001, Denhert won the Elliot Norton Award for Outstanding Director, Large Company for her 2000 productions of My Fair Lady and Who's Afraid of Virginia Woolf? at Trinity Rep.

Terry Teachout, drama critic for The Wall Street Journal, has praised several of Dehnert's productions. He called Dehnert's 2011 production of William Shakespeare's Julius Caesar for the Oregon Shakespeare Festival "the best Julius Caesar I've ever seen, a stark parable of good intentions run amok that has the attention-grabbing power of a hand grenade lobbed into a crowded room." Teachout later named the production the best Shakespeare production of 2011. Teachout praised Dehnert's 2013 Oregon Shakespeare Festival production of My Fair Lady, which was a minimalist reimagining of the musical in the style of Bertolt Brecht. Teachout was initially skeptical of the reimagining but wrote that Dehnert had "successfully wrought a radical transformation on the familiar parable". Teachout also lauded Dehnert's direction of Kate Hamill's adaptation of "Pride and Prejudice" at Hudson Valley Shakespeare Festival in 2017 saying, "Such a show demands worthy staging, and Amanda Dehnert ... delivers the goods with gusto."
