= The Hypocrites (theatre company) =

The Hypocrites is a Chicago storefront theater company founded in 1997 by Sean Graney, Brandon Kruse and Christopher Cintron. The company is currently run by Sean Graney (artistic director) and Kelli Strickland (executive director). One of Chicago’s premier off-Loop theater companies, The Hypocrites specializes in mounting bold productions that challenge preconceptions and redefining the role of the audience through unusual staging (such as promenade and in-the-round) and direct engagement. The company has a reputation in Chicago for creating exciting, surprising, and deeply engaging theater as it re-interprets well-known works for contemporary audiences, reveling in the absurd while revealing the core of what makes classics classic.

“The Hypocrites, who with each new production, continue to rise not just to the rank of one of our city’s best storefronts but one of Chicago’s best theaters period.” – Newcity Stage (American Idiot, 2015)

The company has grown significantly in the past few years, receiving acclaim for productions at the Steppenwolf Garage, Goodman Theatre, Museum of Contemporary Art, DCASE Storefront, Chopin Theater and nationally at American Repertory Theater (A.R.T.), Berkeley Repertory Theatre, and Actors Theatre of Louisville.

== Adaptations ==
Their recent production of Graney's All Our Tragic, a twelve-hour adaptation combining all 32 surviving Greek Tragedies, garnered the company six 2015 Equity Jeff Awards in its first year of eligibility.

“’A watershed moment for off-Loop theater.” – Chris Jones, Chicago Tribune (All Our Tragic, 2014)

Graney's musical adaptations of Gilbert & Sullivan’s Pirates of Penzance, The Mikado and H.M.S. Pinafore have become audience and critic favorites, being remounted numerous times in Chicago as well as going on tour to American Repertory Theater (A.R.T.), Berkeley Repertory Theatre, Actors Theatre of Louisville, Pasadena Playhouse, and Olney Theater Center.

“Cromer calibrates 'Our Town' with clear-eyed intelligence. You see the beauties of small-town America and its limitations, laid out before you as directly and powerfully as the Chicago theater can muster.” – Chris Jones, Chicago Tribune (Our Town, 2008)

== Awards ==
Since the company's founding, The Hypocrites have produced over sixty main stage productions and a dozen festival pieces, securing thirty-one Non-Equity Joseph Jefferson awards, six Equity Joseph Jefferson awards, and two After Dark Awards.

The American Theatre Wing, best known as the creator of the Tony Awards, presented The Hypocrites with one of the 2013 National Theatre Company awards. The company's smash-hit production of Our Town, directed by David Cromer, transferred in 2009 to Off-Broadway, Los Angeles and Boston.

The Hypocrites began performing in the basement of Café Voltaire, a now defunct vegetarian restaurant in Lakeview. Co-founder Sean Graney has been the artistic director since early 2015, when he announced his return from a three-year hiatus. The company's name is inspired by Eugène Ionesco’s Notes and Counter Notes, a compendium of interviews on the nature of theatre throughout which Ionesco regularly contradicts himself — hence its title, and The Hypocrites' name.

== Production history ==
Season 1

- The Bald Soprano
- Woyzeck
- Endgame
- Action

Season 2

- Edmond
- The Danube
- The Firebugs
- The Future is in Eggs
- Marat/Sade

Season 3

- Curse of the Starving Class
- Jack, or the Submission & The Future is in Eggs
- The Cherry Orchard

Season 4

- Lakeboat
- Ajax
- The Curious Sofa
- Arcadia

Season 5

- Blood Wedding
- Rhinoceros
- Leviticus 18
- Henry 5

Season 6

- Machinal
- Happy Days
- Balm in Gilead
- Edward Gorey’s Dispirited Diversion for Christmas

Season 7

- Camille/La Traviata
- Leonce & Lena
- The 4th Graders Present an Unnamed Love-Suicide

Season 8

- Equus
- The Christmas Carol – A Radio Broadcast
- The Glass Menagerie
- True West

Season 9

- Death of a Salesman
- 4.48 Psychosis
- Angels in America, Part I – Millennium Approaches
- Angels in America, Part II – Perestroika

Season 10

- Cat on a Hot Tin Roof
- Mud
- The Bald Soprano

Season 11

- Desire Under the Elms
- Miss Julie
- Our Town

Season 12

- The Threepenny Opera
- Our Town Remounted
- The Hairy Ape
- Oedipus

Season 13

- Frankenstein
- Cabaret
- No Exit

Season 14

- K.
- Pirates of Penzance
- Woyzeck

Season 15

- Sophocles: Seven Sicknesses
- Pirates of Penzance (Remount)
- Six Characters in Search of an Author
- Romeo Juliet

Season 16

- The Fall of the House of Usher
- Gilbert & Sullivan Repertory
- Coriolanus
- Ivywild: The True Tall Tales of Bathhouse John

Season 17

- 12 Nights
- The Mikado at Steppenwolf Garage
- The Tennessee Williams Project
- Into the Woods at Mercury Theatre Chicago

Season 18

- All Our Tragic
- Gilbert and Sullivan Rep: Mikado, Pirates of Penzance and HMS Pinafore
- Endgame
- Three Sisters

Season 19

- American Idiot
- The 4th Graders Present an Unnamed Love-Suicide
- The Ruffians' Burning Bluebeard
- The Glass Menagerie
- Adding Machine: The Musical
- Johanna Faustus

Season 20

- You on the Moors Now
- Cinderella at the Theater for Potatoes
- Wit
- The House of Martin Guerre
- Las Meninas
