= Dawn Monique Williams =

American theatre director (born 1978)

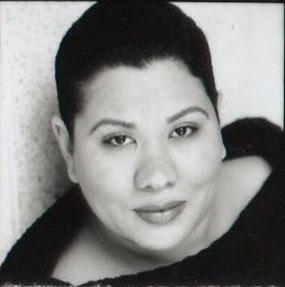
- Born: July 2, 1978 (age 47); Oakland, California, USA
- Occupation: Theatre Director

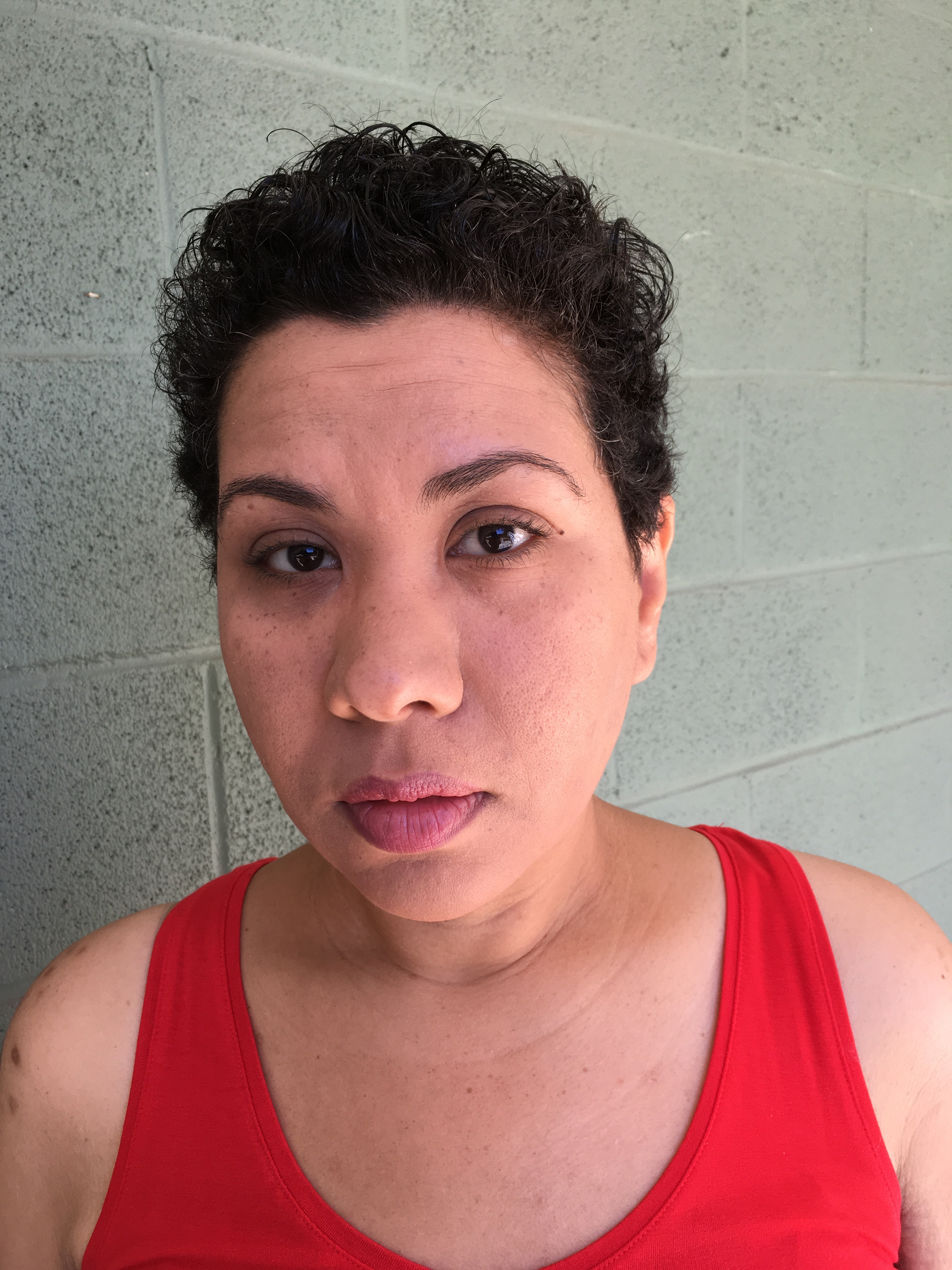

Dawn Monique Williams (born July 2, 1978) is an American theatre director. She was born in Oakland, California, United States, and is a graduate of California State University, Hayward (BA Theatre Arts, 2003), San Francisco State University (MA Drama, 2007) and earned a Master of Fine Arts degree from the University of Massachusetts Amherst in 2011.

== Early life ==
Born in Oakland in 1978, to a white mother and black father, Williams attended Berkeley High School and appears in the PBS Frontline special, School Colors, about racial politics at Berkeley High School 40 years after Brown v. Board of Education. Williams participated in school productions of Day of Absence, A Chorus Line, The Colored Museum, and The Wiz. She directed her first play, Eugène Ionesco's The Lesson, at 15 while a student at BHS.

== Career ==
In 2016, Williams was awarded a Princess Grace Foundation, (USA) Fellowship award in theatre. This Fellowship will support her 2017 production of Merry Wives of Windsor, at the Oregon Shakespeare Festival. From 2014-2016 Williams was in residence at OSF on a Leadership U Grant administered through the Theatre Communications Group and funded by the Mellon Foundation. Williams served as the 2013 Phil Killian Directing Fellow at the Oregon Shakespeare Festival, which is home to America's first practical Elizabethan Stage. Williams was a 2011 Directing Fellow of the Drama League of New York, one of four directors selected for the fall Directors' Project. She was Resident Director for the now defunct Aces Wild Theatre, a touring company regularly taking productions to the Edinburgh Festival Fringe. Her production of Lisa D'Amour's Anna Bella Eema traveled to the Fringe in 2008, and a production of Shakespeare's The Tempest played the festival in August 2010. She is the former Associate Artistic Director for Berkeley's Impact Theatre.

Williams spent several years as an adjunct faculty member in the Theatre and Dance Department at California State University, East Bay where, in November 2012, she directed the U.S. English premiere of the award-winning play NN12, by Gracia Morales. A poet, author, and scholar, frequently lecturing on contemporary Shakespeare performance, Williams contributed to Shakespeare, Race, and Performance: The Diverse Bard (2016), edited by Delia Jarrett-Macauley.

In addition to her work with Aces, and Impact, Williams has worked at Woman's Will, Hampshire Shakespeare Company, the Hayward Greek Festival, the San Francisco Young Playwrights Festival, California Conservatory Theatre, Chester Theatre, New World Theater and has assisted at the leading regional theatres Oregon Shakespeare Festival (Ashland, Oregon), Hartford Stage (Hartford, Connecticut), Shakespeare & Company (Lenox, Massachusetts), TheatreWorks (Palo Alto, California), and California Shakespeare Theater (Berkeley, California). Her passion is Shakespearean classics, heightened language plays, and magic/heightened realism, which is evident in these select directing credits: The Winter’s Tale, Twelfth Night, Much Ado About Nothing, Scapin the Cheat, Sleepy, Steel Magnolias, Children of Eden, The 25th Annual Putnam County Spelling Bee, Little Shop of Horrors, The Burial at Thebes, My California, Medea, Trojan Women, In the Blood, and La Ronde.
