= Libby Appel =

4th artistic director, Oregon Shakespeare Festival

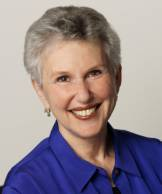
- Born: May 14, 1937 (age 89)

Libby Appel (born May 14, 1937) served as the fourth artistic director of the Oregon Shakespeare Festival (OSF) from 1995 to June 2007. Appel directed more than 25 productions at OSF, and her artistic vision influenced the 11 plays presented each year during her tenure. Despite the festival's name, she placed increased emphasis on new works. “We have made major connections with world playwrights, artists whose voices we’re particularly interested in.” Appel said. “We commission playwrights, we develop plays here; we have playwrights in residence. We’re a world force now, and I’m really proud of that.”

== Biography ==
Appel holds a BA from The University of Michigan, an MA from Northwestern University, and three honorary doctorates from Southern Oregon University, University of Portland, and Willamette University. She began her theatrical career teaching acting at the Goodman Theatre in Chicago, 1970 to 1976. From 1976 to 1981, she chaired the acting program at California State University Long Beach, and served as associate artistic director at the California Shakespeare Festival in 1980-1981. In 1981, Appel was named dean of theatre at the California Institute of the Arts in Valencia, California. During this period she took freelance directing jobs during summers, authored Mask Characterization: An Acting Process, co-authored two plays, Shakespeare’s Women and Shakespeare’s Lovers, with Michael Flachmann, and created and produced a video, Inter/Face: The Actor and the Mask. From 1992 to 1996, she served as artistic director of Indiana Repertory Theatre, where she saw her mission as bringing “diversity to every aspect of the theatre, reinvigorate the theatre’s approach to the classics, increase dialogue with the community…expand the theatre’s commitment to young people, and increase the commissioning of new projects.”

She is the recipient of the 2010 Kennedy Center’s Stephen and Christine Schwarzman Legacy Award for Excellence in Theatre, which recognizes “lifetime achievement in theatre and unparalleled commitment to the future of the art form through teaching.” Awarded only six times, the Legacy Award includes a $10,000 scholarship in her name to the Oregon Shakespeare Festival's Fellowships, Assistantships, Internships and Residencies [FAIR] program that fosters collaborative exchange of knowledge, skills, and perspectives between experienced professionals and the next generation of theatre practitioners.

Theatres in which Appel worked include Intiman Theatre, the Guthrie Theater, Indiana Repertory Theatre, Seattle Repertory Theatre, South Coast Repertory, PlayMakers Repertory Company, Arizona Theatre Company, Alliance Theatre Company, Milwaukee Repertory Theater, New Mexico Repertory, The Goodman Theatre, Court Theatre, Syracuse Stage, Repertory Theatre of St. Louis, San Jose Repertory Theatre, Utah Shakespeare Festival, and the Alabama, Colorado and Kern Shakespeare Festivals.

== Work at Oregon Shakespeare Festival ==
In 1995, Appel became the fourth artistic director in the company's history, but had already directed a production of The Merchant of Venice in 1991. “I was the risky director who did The Merchant of Venice and rocked this theater,” she says. The Christian characters wore Armani-style suits and Shylock was presented as a yarmulke-wearing Orthodox Jew. “I’m an American Jew, and I had stayed away from Merchant all my life because of the anti-Semitism that surrounds the character of Shylock.” She decided the play was more about xenophobia than anti-Semitism. As the first woman to run the festival, Appel set out to make it more ethnically diverse and inclusive of women. She not only increased the representation of non-white actors in the company to more than a third, she raised the number of new plays in the festival's mix. Appel has been intent on attracting an audience that is both younger and less white, while keeping the sophisticated seniors who flock to Ashland. “For me, it’s about the truth of the play in the moment that I’m living,” Appel says. “I think to contemporize the speech, or bastardize it, is dumbing it down.”

In 18 seasons at the Oregon Shakespeare Festival, Appel directed: Pride and Prejudice, Paradise Lost, A View from the Bridge, The Cherry Orchard (her own adaptation from an original translation), The Tempest, The Winter’s Tale (2006 and 1989), Bus Stop, Richard III, Napoli Milionaria!, Henry VI, Parts One, Two and Three (co-directed with the adapter, Scott Kaiser), Richard II, Macbeth, Saturday, Sunday, Monday, The Trip to Bountiful, Three Sisters, Henry V, Hamlet, Henry IV, Part Two, Measure for Measure, Uncle Vanya, King Lear, The Magic Fire (also at the Kennedy Center), The Merchant of Venice, Breaking the Silence, Enrico IV (the Emperor), The Seagull (Portland). (Chronological order, most recent at the top)

Appel has completed five commissions from OSF for new versions (from literal translations from Russian to English by Alison Horsley) of The Cherry Orchard, The Seagull, Uncle Vanya, Three Sisters and Ivanov.
