= Bill Rauch =

American theatre director (born 1962)

- Rauch in 2026
- Born: 1962 (age 63–64)
- Education: Harvard University (BA)
- Occupation: Theatre director
- Awards: Tony Award for Best Direction of a Musical (2026)

Bill Rauch (born 1962) is an American theater director.

Rauch is the founder of the Cornerstone Theater Company, a traveling company that brought theatre to rural communities across the United States before settling in Los Angeles to work with urban communities. He has been an Associate Artist at Yale Repertory Theatre since 2002 and at South Coast Repertory since 2004. Rauch has been described as an "interpretive director," one who “believes in creating ‘dynamic… twenty-first century’ productions that are ‘mined’ for various points of view."

Previously, Rauch served as the fifth artistic director of the Oregon Shakespeare Festival (OSF), from June 2007 through August 2019, where he commissioned several critically acclaimed, diverse plays that transferred to Broadway including Lynn Nottage’s Pulitzer Prize-winning Sweat, Paula Vogel’s Indecent, Robert Schenkkan’s Tony Award-winning All the Way, the Go-Go's musical Head over Heels, and Schenkkan's All The Way sequel The Great Society.

He was named the inaugural artistic director of the Ronald O. Perelman Performing Arts Center at the World Trade Center in 2018. The Perelman was the final piece of the plan to revitalize the World Trade Center site. He and Zhailon Levingston directed Cats: The Jellicle Ball at the Perelman, which subsequently transferred to Broadway and won them the Tony Award for Best Direction of a Musical.

== Education ==
Rauch graduated from Harvard College in 1984 with a B.A. degree in English and American Literature and Language, where he was a recipient of the Louis Sudler Prize for Outstanding Graduating Artist.

== Career ==
=== Cornerstone Theater ===
Rauch co-founded the community-based, touring Cornerstone Theater Company in 1986 with Alison Carey, where he directed more than 40 productions, most of them collaborations with diverse rural and urban communities across the United States, and served as artistic director from 1986 to 2006. He oversaw an additional 25 commissions of new work.

Their first adapted production was The Marmarth Hamlet, set and staged in Marmath, North Dakota as a Wild West musical. In 1989, Cornerstone created a Romeo and Juliet in Port Gibson, Mississippi, with 11 members of the company and over 50 local residents as cast and crew. It starred Amy Brenneman as Juliet and local high school senior Edret Brinston as Romeo. In 1994, they staged the medieval morality play, Everyman, at Santa Monica Place and "Death chases Everyman in the shadows of Victoria’s Secret." In 2004, Rauch collaborated with playwright José Cruz González to adapt Washington Irving's story "Rip Van Winkle" into Waking Up in Lost Hills.

=== Oregon Shakespeare Festival ===
Rauch became the Oregon Shakespeare Festival's fifth artistic director in 2007, after five seasons at the Festival as a guest director. As visiting director at OSF, Rauch directed Handler (2002), Hedda Gabler (2003), The Comedy of Errors (2004), By the Waters of Babylon (2005), The Two Gentlemen of Verona (2006), and Romeo and Juliet (2007).

The Green Show (free pre-show entertainment) had "hosted Renaissance dancers and Elizabethan music," and under Rauch's tenure, they expanded it to "include an ever-rotating bill of fare of artists from our own region and as far away as Mexico City or New York." In 2015, OSF launched the inaugural sessions of "artEquity, a facilitator training initiative on inclusion and equity issues for theatre companies nationwide." In his final season, actors of color made up 70% of the performers at OSF."

On February 16, 2018, Rauch announced that his directorship would come to an end in August 2019.

==== Directing work ====
During his 17 seasons at OSF, Rauch directed nine world premieres including, Mother Road, La Comedia of Errors, Off the Rails, Roe, Fingersmith, The Great Society, All the Way, Equivocation and By the Waters of Babylon. He also directed 19 other plays at the Festival including Othello, Richard II, Antony and Cleopatra, King Lear, Cymbeline, Measure for Measure, Hamlet, The Merchant of Venice, Romeo and Juliet, The Two Gentlemen of Verona and The Comedy of Errors. He also directed Oklahoma!, Medea/Macbeth/Cinderella, The Pirates of Penzance, The Music Man, The Clay Cart, Hedda Gabler, and The Further Adventures of Hedda Gabler and Handler.

==== Commissions and initiatives ====
During his time at OSF, Rauch was known for diversifying the company and the audience. Rauch's programming combined Shakespeare, other classics, contemporary work, and plays commissioned for the company, as well as classical musicals and plays outside the Western canon.

Rauch commissioned 37 new plays as part of American Revolutions: the U.S. History Cycle, to dramatize moments of change in American history, inspired by Shakespeare’s history plays and funded in part by grants from the Andrew W. Mellon, Collins Family, and Paul G. Allen Family Foundations. He also initiated the Black Swan Lab for New Work and a community-based format for the Green Show.

=== Other directorial work ===
Rauch directed several OSF plays at other theaters, including Equivocation, All the Way and The Great Society at Seattle Rep; The Pirates of Penzance at Portland Opera; Mother Road, Equivocation, A Community Carol, and Roe at Arena Stage; Roe at Berkeley Rep; Othello, Fingersmith, and All the Way at the American Repertory Theater for which he twice won the Independent Reviewers of New England award for Best Director. All the Way then moved to the Neil Simon Theatre on Broadway in 2014, where it won the Tony Award for Best Play and Rauch also earned Drama Desk and Outer Critics Circle Award nominations for directing. The Great Society moved to the Vivian Beaumont Theater on Broadway in 2019 and opened October 1, 2019.

Rauch has directed a number of world premieres, including Naomi Wallace's Night is a Room at New York's Signature Theatre; The Body of an American at Portland Center Stage which, along with All the Way, was co-winner of the inaugural Edward M. Kennedy Prize for Drama Inspired by American History; The Clean House at Yale Repertory Theatre; and Living Out and For Here or To Go? at the Mark Taper Forum. He directed the world premiere of Peace by Culture Clash at the Getty Villa, an adaptation of Aristophanes's play of the same name. He also directed the New York premiere of The Clean House at Lincoln Center Theater. Work elsewhere includes productions at South Coast Repertory, Guthrie Theater, Long Wharf Theater, Pasadena Playhouse, Great Lakes Theater Festival, Touchstone Theater, and En Garde Arts.

=== Broadway ===
In 2014, Rauch directed the Broadway production of All the Way by Robert Schenkkan after commissioning and directing the play at OSF in 2012. The limited-engagement production opened on March 6, 2014 at the Neil Simon Theatre and concluded on June 29, 2014. The production won two Tony Awards, the 2014 Tony Award for Best Play and the 2014 Tony Award for Best Performance by a Leading Actor in a Play, which went to Bryan Cranston. The play also won the Drama Desk and Outer Critics Circle Award for Outstanding Play. Rauch was nominated for both a Drama Desk and Outer Critics Circle Award for his direction.

In 2019, Rauch again worked with Schenkkan on The Great Society, the sequel to All the Way, which ran for a twelve week limited-engagement on Broadway at The Vivian Beaumont Theater, beginning September 6, 2019. The play starred Emmy-winner Brian Cox as President Lyndon B. Johnson.

=== Ronald O. Perelman Performing Arts Center ===
In February 2018, Rauch was named the inaugural artistic director of the Ronald O. Perelman Performing Arts Center, a flexible midsize performance space at The World Trade Center that produces theater, dance, music, and chamber opera. The center opened in September 2023. Rauch's first show, co-directed with Zhailon Levingston, was Cats: The Jellicle Ball, which premiered in June 2024.

=== Service to the arts ===
Rauch has served as an adviser, keynote speaker, commencement speaker, and advocate for the arts.

In 1999, Rauch testified to the U.S. Congress on behalf of the National Endowment for the Arts. He said of Cornerstone, "'By bringing together people face to face to create community-based theater, we build bridges across differences of racial, economic and religious backgrounds.'"

In 2019, he delivered the keynote address at the Association for Theatre in Higher Education conference. It was later published in the journal, Theatre Topics.

=== Teaching ===
Rauch has taught at University of California, Los Angeles, University of Southern California, and California State University, Los Angeles. From 2005-2007, he was Claire Trevor Professor of Drama and Bren Fellow at University of California, Irvine.

Rauch launched the Cornerstone Institute, an international model for training activist artists that "teaches participants its community-engaged aesthetic by mounting an original production".

== Awards and honors ==
- 2026: Tony Award for Best Direction of a Musical
- 2018: Ivy Bethune Award from Actors’ Equity Association for diversity and inclusion in hiring, casting and producing.
- 2017 & 2014: Best Director, Independent Reviewers of New England
- 2017: The inaugural "Guiding Star" Award
- 2015: Named to the “YBCA 100” list by the Yerba Buena Center for the Arts in San Francisco
- 2015: Ford Foundation Art of Change Fellow
- 2014: Best Director - Drama Desk & Outer Critics Circle (nominated)
- 2013: Falstaff Award
- 2012: Zelda Fichandler Award
- 2010: Visionary Leadership Award from Theatre Communications Group
- 2009: Margo Jones Award. The award is presented annually by Ohio State University and honors "that citizen-of-the theatre who has demonstrated a significant impact, understanding, and affirmation of the craft of playwriting, with a lifetime commitment to the encouragement of the living theatre everywhere."
- 2008: United States Artists Prudential Fellowship
- 2003: Outstanding Direction, Connecticut Critics Circle Award
- 2002 & 1995: CalArts/Herb Alpert Award (nominated)
- 2001: "Leadership for a Changing World" award. He is the only artist to have won the inaugural award.
- 2000 and 1999: Best Director, Garland Awards & L.A. Weekly Award
- 1997: Rockefeller Foundation’s Next Generation Network (nominated)
- 1997 and 1996: Best Director, Ovation Award (nominated)
- 1991: Helen Hayes Award for Outstanding Direction, Non-Resident Production
- 1988: Esquire Register Honoree for men and women under 40 shaping America’s future
