= Fingersmith (play) =

Play based on novel

Fingersmith is a 2015 theatrical adaptation of Sarah Waters' novel of the same name by Alexa Junge. The play had its world premiere at the Oregon Shakespeare Festival in March 2015, where it was introduced by Waters. In the winter of 2016–2017, the play was staged in Cambridge, Massachusetts, by the American Repertory Theater. Both the Oregon and Massachusetts productions were directed by Bill Rauch.

== Reception ==
The play received mostly positive reviews. Molly Tinsley, reviewing the Oregon production for Jefferson Public Radio, enthused about Rauch's "masterful direction" and praised Junge for "distilling" the long novel into a three act play. The next year, Patti Hartigan, writing for The Boston Globe, praised the adaptation as "nimble." Bob Verini, writing in Variety, said it was a "crowd pleaser", but felt that it could have had "a bigger kick" and could have addressed some of its themes with more seriousness. The book's author indicated that she was pleased by the choice of a three-act structure for the play, as it reflects the "classic form of the Victorian novel."
