= List of theatres in California =

== Contra Costa County ==
- California Theatre in Pittsburg
- Lesher Center for the Arts in Walnut Creek

== Fresno County ==
- Tower Theater, in Fresno's Tower District.
- Warnors Theater in Downtown Fresno built in 1928.
- Azteca Theater in Fresno's Chinatown.

== Los Angeles County ==
- Los Angeles Music Center, in Los Angeles, containing multiple pavilions.

== Monterey County ==
- Forest Theater, in Carmel-by-the-Sea, contains multiple venues.
- Golden Bough Playhouse, in Carmel-by-the-Sea, contains multiple venues.
- Pacific Repertory Theatre, in Carmel-by-the-Sea, operates in multiple venues.

== Napa County ==
- Lincoln Theatre in Yountville
- Napa Valley Opera House in Napa

== Orange County ==
- Orange County Performing Arts Center

== San Diego County ==
- La Paloma Theatre

== San Benito County ==
- Teatro Campesino

== San Mateo County ==
- Circle Star Theater, San Carlos; closed in 1993
- Hyatt Music Theater, Burlingame; closed in 1965
- San Mateo Performing Arts Center in San Mateo

== Santa Clara County ==
- Cantor Arts Center at Stanford University near Palo Alto
- Mountain View Center for the Performing Arts in Mountain View, California
- TheatreWorks Silicon Valley in Palo Alto

== Sonoma County ==
- Cinnabar Theater in Petaluma

== Yolo County ==
- Mondavi Center in Davis
