= Allen Elizabethan Theatre =

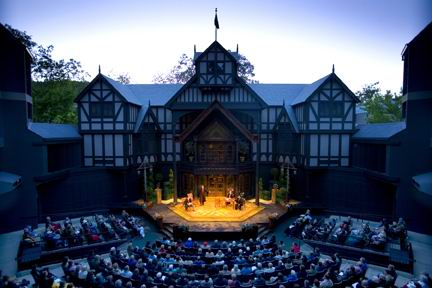
- The theatre, 2005

- Location within Oregon
- Location: Ashland, Oregon, U.S.
- Coordinates: 42.19618°N 122.71504°W

The Allen Elizabethan Theatre has evolved since the founding of the Oregon Shakespeare Festival when the first performance of Twelfth Night was presented on July 2, 1935.

== Original Elizabethan Theatre ==
The design for the first outdoor OSF Elizabethan Theatre was sketched by Angus L. Bowmer based on his recollection of productions at the University of Washington in which he had acted while a student. Ashland, Oregon obtained WPA funds in 1935 to build it within the 12-foot (3.7 m) circular walls that remained in the roofless shell of the abandoned Chautauqua theatre. Bowmer extended the walls to reduce the stage width to fifty-five feet, and painted the extensions to resemble half-timbered buildings. He designed a thrust stage—one projecting toward the audience—with a balcony. Two columns helped divide the main stage into forestage, middle stage, and inner stage areas. Illustrating the improvised nature of it all, actors doubled as stage hands, stage lighting was housed in coffee cans, and string beans were planted along the walls to improve sound quality. Fifty-cent general admission seating was on benches just behind the one-dollar reserved seating on folding chairs. This theatre was torn down during World War II.

== Second Elizabethan Theatre ==
The second outdoor Elizabethan Theatre was built in 1947 from plans drawn up by University of Washington drama professor John Conway. The main stage became trapezoidal, with entries added on either side, and windows added above them flanking the balcony stage. A low railing gave a finished appearance to the forestage. Chairs arranged to improve sight lines replaced bench seating. Backstage areas were added gradually and haphazardly, until the ramshackle result was ordered torn down as a fire hazard in 1958.

== Current Allen Elizabethan Theatre ==
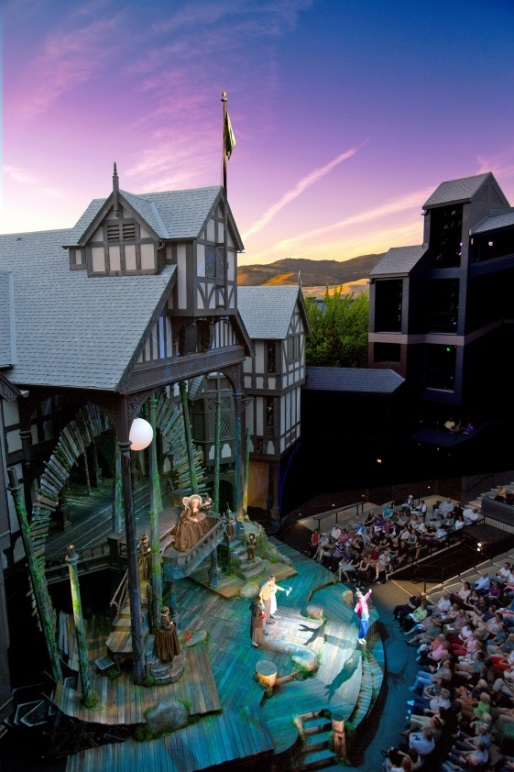
The theatre in 2014

The next year saw the opening of the current outdoor theatre, whose name was changed from Elizabethan to Allen Elizabethan Theatre in October 2013. Patterned on London's 1599 Fortune Theatre and designed by Richard L. Hay, it incorporated all the stage dimensions mentioned in the Fortune contract. The trapezoidal stage was retained but the façade was extended to three stories, resulting in a forestage, middle stage, inner below, inner above (the old balcony), and a musicians' gallery. The wings were provided with second-story windows. Each provides acting areas, creating many staging possibilities. A pitched, shingled roof enhances the half-timbered façade. A windowed gable was extended from the center of the roof to cover and define the middle stage. Just before each performance, an actor opens the gable window, and in keeping with Elizabethan tradition signaling a play in progress, runs a flag up the pole to the sound of a trumpet and doffs his cap to the audience.

The result is an approximate replica of the Fortune Theatre. The known but incomplete dimensions apply only to the stage. The original specifications sometimes say no more than "to be built like the Globe," for which there are no plans or details. The remotely operated lighting, on scaffolding on either side of the stage, of course did not exist in the original, and the current site rather than the original architecture largely determined the shape of the auditorium. Twelve hundred seats in slightly offset arcs ascend the original hillside, giving an excellent view of the stage from each seat. The old Chautauqua theatre walls, now ivy-covered, remain as the outer perimeter of the theatre.

The $7.6 million Paul Allen Pavilion was added in 1992. It houses a control room, and audience services including rental of infrared hearing devices, blankets, pillows, and food and drink, both of which are allowed in the auditorium. Several hundred seats were moved to a balcony and two boxes, further improving sightlines and acoustics. Vomitoria (colloquially, "voms"), the traditional name for entryways for actors from under the seating area, were added and the lighting scaffolds were eliminated.
