= A Little Princess (musical) =

Musical

- The Musical
- Music: Andrew Lippa
- Lyrics: Brian Crawley
- Book: Brian Crawley
- Basis: A Little Princess by Frances Hodgson Burnett
- Productions: 2004 Palo Alto/TheatreWorks; 2005 New York City; 2018 London

A Little Princess, The Musical is a musical with music by Andrew Lippa and book and lyrics by Brian Crawley, based on the 1905 children's novel of the same name by Frances Hodgson Burnett.

== Production history ==
Produced by TheatreWorks, the musical premiered at the Mountain View Center for the Performing Arts in Mountain View, California, on August 28, 2004, following previews from August 25. This production was directed by Susan Schulman with a cast that starred MacKenzie Mauzy as Sara Crewe and Will Chase as Captain Crewe. Although A Little Princess was labeled as "Broadway-bound", the musical has not, as of July 2016, been produced on Broadway.

In September 2005, A Little Princess was featured in National Alliance for Musical Theatre's 17th Annual Festival of New Musicals, held off-Broadway at Dodger Stages in New York City.

A cast recording featuring Sierra Boggess as Sara, Julia Murney as Miss Minchin, Will Chase as Captain Crewe, and Remy Zaken was released in 2010 by Ghostlight Records.

A new version of the musical was performed in a concert in October 2011 by the Texas State University musical theatre department, conducted by Lippa.

The musical received its premiere in London at Southbank Centre on May 28, 2018. The one-night-only production was the first to have a child ensemble playing its array of schoolgirls. Amanda Abbington played Miss Minchin, and Danny Mac played Captain Crewe.

The performing rights to the musical are available from Musical Theatre International.

== Plot summary ==
Sara Crewe is a girl who was raised in Africa and now attends a London boarding school. She draws the ire of the headmistress Winifred Minchin for going to supper without shoes on and for mingling with Becky, a scullery maid at the school. Crewe's father Captain Crewe enrolled her in the boarding school while he undertakes an expedition to Timbuktu. He promises to return for Sara Crewe. Sara Crewe's father's wealth means provides her with privileges that her schoolmates are both jealous of and curious about.

Crewe tells stories to her schoolmates and talks about contacting spirits which Minchin disapproves of. Meanwhile in Africa, Captain Crewe struggles on his expedition. Sara Crewe gains friends in classmates Ermengarde and Lottie, who moreover apologize to Becky for their previous behavior toward her.

After time passes, the school celebrates Sara Crewe's birthday. Having made some money on the stock market based on rumors that Captain Crewe reached Timbuktu, Minchin is more amenable toward Sara than previously. However, a lawyer interrupts the birthday party to inform the school that Captain Crewe never reached Timbuktu and died. Sara is orphaned with no money and Minchin's stock market gains are reversed. Minchin obliges Crewe to begin working as staff in the school.

Sara endures her reversal of fortune. Christmas draws near. After disputation, Minchin locks Crewe and Becky in the attic. Becky attempts to comfort Crewe through imagination, but Crewe is inconsolable. After they fall asleep, Pasko—a friend of Crewe's from St. Louis—sneaks into their attic and brings food and amenities to comfort them. Upon waking, Becky is startled to see Pasko in the attic. Hearing the ruckus, Minchin goes to the attic to check what is happening. Crewe escapes with Pasko out the window. Scared of heights, Becky says she will rendezvous with Pasko and Crewe at another time.

Minchin makes plans to have Crewe arrested, but then Crewe returns to the school in the company of Queen Victoria. Having told her about Minchin's cruelty by Crew, Queen Victoria has Minchin arrested. At the show's end, Crewe's father is revealed to be alive after all as they reunite.

== Song list ==
Note: from the Studio cast album, released in 2011

Act 1

- Overture
- Good Luck – Bonne Chance - Sara and Chorus
- Soon, My Love – Captain Crewe
- Live Out Loud – Sara
- Let Your Heart Be Your Compass – Sara, Becky, School Girls, and Chorus
- The Widow Zuma – Ermengarde, Sara, Lottie
- Home by Christmas – Captain Crewe
- Isn't That Always the Way – Captain Crewe
- Lucky – Miss Minchin
- If the Tables Were Turned – Becky, Sara, Ermengarde, Lottie
- Timbuktu Delirium – Chorus
- Soldier On – Sara
- Be a Princess – Sara, Lavinia, Ermengarde, Lottie and other school girls

Act 2

- Another World – Sara
- Almost Christmas – Sara, Schoolgirls and Chorus
- Captain Crewe – Pasko
- Once Upon A Time – Miss Amelia
- Broken Old Doll – Becky
- Timbuktu – Becky, Sara, and Chorus
- Soon – Pasko, Sara, Becky, and Miss Minchin
- Gossip – Ermengarde, Lottie, Lavinia, Becky, and other schoolgirls
- "Compass" Reprise – Chorus, School Girls
- Finale – Full Company

== Critical response ==
Richard Connema, for Talkin' Broadway, wrote:

"I give credit to TheatreWorks, Mr. Lippa, Mr. Crawley and director Susan H. Schulman for working toward making this old-fashioned family musical work wend its way to Broadway. However, the show needs to flow more smoothly and the characters need to be defined more sharply. There is just too much going on, with too little focus on the central characters. It's not a sophisticated musical, but there are saving graces in this production's singing, exuberant athletic dancing, melodic score and good production values. However, something is lacking to make it a great musical. Two liabilities are the indigestible book and two stories presented side by side".
