= Henry Woronicz =

American actor, director, producer (born 1954)

Henry Woronicz (/ˈwɒrənɪts/; born 1954) is an American actor, director, and producer who served as the artistic director of the Oregon Shakespeare Festival (OSF) from 1991 to 1995. He was an actor and resident director there starting in 1984. In addition to his work at OSF, he has acted and directed in many other theaters, and has extensive film and TV credits.

== Biography ==
=== Early life ===
Woronicz was born in Northampton, Massachusetts of Polish and Irish descent. He graduated from Bridgewater State College in 1976, with a BA in Communication Arts and Sciences. He acted and directed at the Utah Shakespearean Festival, Berkeley Repertory Theatre, American Conservatory Theater, Los Angeles Theatre Center and others, before joining the Oregon Shakespeare Festival in 1984.

=== Oregon Shakespeare Festival years ===
Before he became artistic director he spent seven years at Oregon Shakespeare Festival acting in many roles: as Petruchio in The Taming of the Shrew and the title roles in many productions, including Peer Gynt, Cyrano de Bergerac, and Henry VIII. His early directing credits included Romeo and Juliet, Henry IV, part 2, Other People's Money, and Master Harold ... and the Boys.

In 1991, he followed Jerry Turner as OSF's third artistic director. After assuming the role of artistic director, Woronicz continued to act and direct. During those years he directed Pravda, Hamlet, The Rehearsal, Cymbeline, and All's Well That Ends Well. He was artistic director from 1991 to 1995.

=== Later work ===
In 2005 Woronicz appeared on Broadway in Julius Caesar at the Belasco Theatre. In 2006 he directed Pericles, Prince of Tyre at the Illinois Shakespeare Festival and Coriolanus in 2007 at the Utah Shakespearean Festival. He played Leontes in The Winter's Tale at the American Repertory Theatre in Cambridge, MA and has appeared in plays at the Indiana Repertory Theatre, Actors Theatre of Louisville, and the American Players Theatre.

In 2009, he served in a consulting capacity as the Executive Producer of the Lake Tahoe Shakespeare Festival, producing productions of Measure For Measure and Much Ado About Nothing at the Festival's amphitheater in Sand Harbor State Park, on the shores of Lake Tahoe. From 2009-12, Mr. Woronicz was on the faculty of the School of Theatre and Dance at Illinois State University, where he served as the Head of Graduate Acting.

=== Film and television credits ===
He has acted in films and television shows from 1991 to the present. He has appeared in such feature films as Primary Colors and Living Out Loud. His television credits include parts in Seinfeld, Ally McBeal, Ed, Frasier, Moesha, 3rd Rock from the Sun, Cheers, Picket Fences, Third Watch, Star Trek: The Next Generation, Star Trek: Voyager, and Law & Order.
