= California Theatre =

California Theatre may refer to:

- California Theatre (Los Angeles)
- California Theatre (San Bernardino)
- California Theatre (San Jose), the home of Opera San José
- California Theatre (Pittsburg, California)
- California Theatre (San Francisco), demolished, formerly at what is now 440 Bush St, San Francisco
