= Elizabethan stage =

Elizabethan stage may refer to:

- English Renaissance theatre, an English drama genre and the theatres in which it was performed
- Allen Elizabethan Theatre at Oregon Shakespeare Festival, a contemporary American theatre modeled after the Renaissance-era Fortune Playhouse in London
