= Angus L. Bowmer =

American theatre director and actor (1904–1979)

- Born: Angus Livingston Bowmer; September 25, 1904; Bellingham, Washington, U.S.
- Died: May 26, 1979 (aged 74)
- Education: Western Washington University; University of Washington
- Occupations: Theatre director, actor
- Known for: Founding the Oregon Shakespeare Festival
- Spouse: Gertrude Butler

Angus Livingston Bowmer (September 25, 1904 – May 26, 1979) was the founder of the Oregon Shakespeare Festival in Ashland, Oregon, United States. During his tenure as artistic director, he produced all 37 of William Shakespeare's plays and performed 32 Shakespearean roles in 43 separate stagings.

== Biography ==
Angus Livingston Bowmer was born in Bellingham, Washington, on September 25, 1904. He was the only child of Charles C. Bowmer (born August 19, 1880, Nevada; died February 1967, Portland, Oregon) and Florence "Flora" Priest (born Dec 1880, Wisconsin; died June 5, 1958, Portland, Oregon). He moved with his family at least twice, living in Mount Vernon, Washington, in 1910 and Oak Harbor, Washington, by 1920. He graduated from the Washington State Normal School at Bellingham (now Western Washington University) in 1923.

Bowmer attended the University of Washington in Seattle in the 1930s, acting in at least two of its Shakespeare productions, Love's Labor's Lost and Cymbeline under guest director Ben Iden Payne, an Englishman whose ideas for neo-Elizabethan staging of Shakespeare's plays provided inspiration later in Bowmer's life as he began producing the plays that became the Oregon Shakespeare Festival.

In 1931, Bowmer was invited to become an instructor in English at Southern Oregon Normal School, a predecessor to Southern Oregon University, in Ashland, Oregon. Bowmer married Gertrude Butler prior to enlisting in the Army July 20, 1942, where he served as a Warrant Officer. After serving his country and returning to Oregon, Bowmer organized theater activities in Ashland and continued teaching at the college until he retired in 1971. Bowmer befriended Fred C. Adams, who came to Ashland to observe the festival's operations prior to Adams founding the Utah Shakespearean Festival in 1961.

Bowmer remained active in the festival until his death in 1979. His wife, secretary, assistant, and festival hostess, Gertrude Butler Bowmer, died August 19, 1994.

== Beginnings of the Shakespeare Festival ==
The remains of an old Chautauqua building in Ashland's Lithia Park gave Bowmer the idea of staging Shakespeare plays on an outdoor Elizabethan stage. In 1935 he persuaded the government of Ashland to revive the tradition of July 4th celebrations with an important addition: a Shakespearean Festival.

The Works Progress Administration helped construct a makeshift Elizabethan stage on the Chautauqua site and Bowmer, college students, teachers, and Ashland citizens mounted two plays, The Merchant of Venice and Twelfth Night, for three performances. Bowmer directed and played the roles of Shylock and Sir Toby Belch. Several hundred people attended the First Annual Shakespearean Festival. When Bowmer died in 1979, the OSF had performed Shakespeare's entire canon twice.

== Bibliography ==
- Bowmer, A. L. (1932). Andrew Jackson; an historical drama in nine scenes.
- Bowmer, A. L. (1933). Angus Bowmer scrapbook.
- Bowmer, A. L. (1934). Oregon diamond jubilee: official program. [S.l: s.n.]
- Bowmer, A. L. (1975). As I remember, Adam: an autobiography of a festival. Ashland: Oregon Shakespearean Festival Association.
- Bowmer, A. L. (1978). The Ashland Elizabethan stage: its genesis, development, and use. Shreds and patches, chapbook 1. Ashland, Or: Oregon Shakespearean Festival Association.
- Bowmer, A. L. (1979). Acting and directing on the Ashland Elizabethan stage. Shreds and patches, chapbook 2. Ashland, Or: Oregon Shakespearean Festival Association.

== Awards ==
- 1961, the University of Oregon Distinguished Service Award.
- 1964, Edith Knight Hill Memorial Award, for outstanding contribution to Oregon, by Portland Professional Chapter Theta Sigma Phi
- 1974, presidential appointee to the National Council of the Arts
- 1977, the First Annual Governor's Award for Significant Contributions to the Advancement of the Arts in Oregon, a joint resolution by the Oregon Legislature
- 2000, Western Washington University, Alumni of the Century
