= Oregon Shakespeare Festival =

Repertory theatre in Oregon, United States

Coordinates: 42.1962°N 122.7151°W

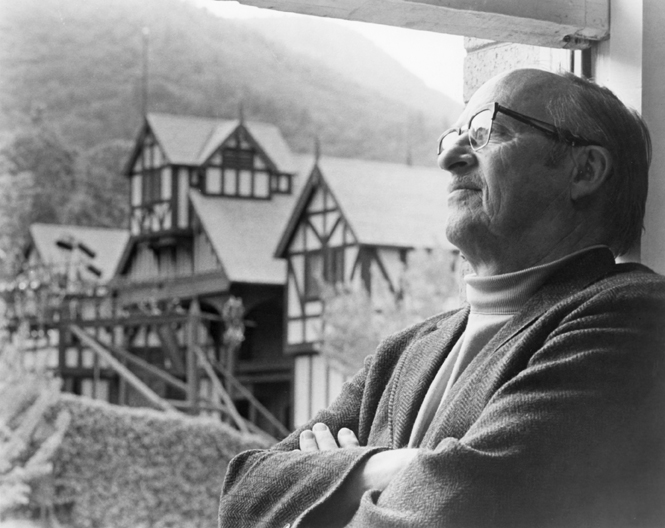
- Angus Bowmer and the outdoor theatre, the keystone of the Oregon Shakespeare Festival he created.
- Genre: Repertory theatre
- Begins: Each March
- Ends: Each October
- Frequency: Annually
- Location: Ashland, Oregon
- Inaugurated: 1935
- Attendance: 400,000 (annual)
- Budget: $32 million (annual)
- Website: www.osfashland.org

The Oregon Shakespeare Festival (OSF) is a regional repertory theatre in Ashland, Oregon, United States, founded in 1935 by Angus L. Bowmer. The Festival now offers matinee and evening performances of a wide range of classic and contemporary plays not limited to Shakespeare. During the Festival, between five and eleven plays are offered in daily rotation six days a week in its three theatres. It welcomed its millionth visitor in 1971, its 10-millionth in 2001, and its 20-millionth visitor in 2015. It draws 350,000 visitors annually.

== Overview ==
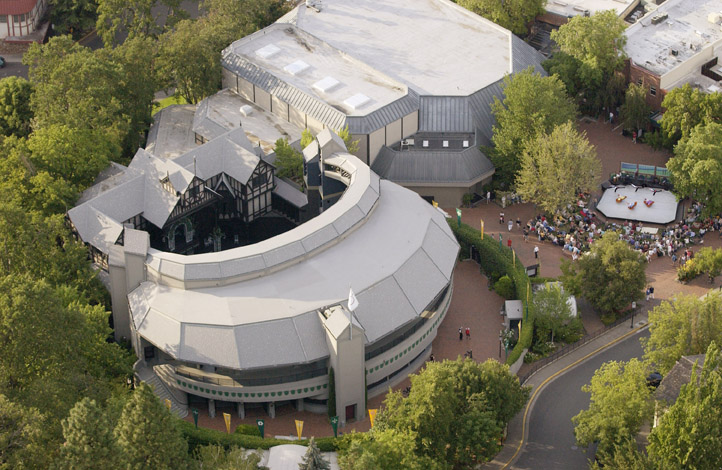
Aerial view of Elizabethan and Bowmer Theatres during a Green Show (see below)

The Oregon Shakespeare Festival (OSF) is a regional repertory theatre in Ashland, Oregon, United States, founded in 1935 by Angus L. Bowmer. From late April through December each year, the Festival now offers 800 to 850 matinee and evening performances of a wide range of classic and contemporary plays not limited to Shakespeare to a total annual audience of nearly 400,000. The Festival welcomed its millionth visitor in 1971, its 10-millionth in 2001, and its 20-millionth visitor in 2015. At any given time between five and eleven plays are offered in daily rotation six days a week in its three theatres.

Each year, two or three plays are staged in the outdoor Allen Elizabethan Theatre, two or three in the intimate Thomas Theatre, and four or five in the traditional Angus Bowmer Theatre. OSF has completed the entire Shakespeare canon of 37 plays in 1958, 1978, 1997, and 2016. Since 1960, it has also offered non-Shakespearean plays. Since 2000 there has been at least one new work each season from playwrights such as Octavio Solis and Robert Schenkkan, several of which have gone on to other venues and numerous awards (see below). A complete list by year and theatre is available here: Production history of the Oregon Shakespeare Festival. OSF also provides a broad range of educational programs for middle schools, high schools, college students, teachers, and theatre professionals.

== History ==
In 1893, the residents of Ashland built a facility to host Chautauqua events. In its heyday, it accommodated audiences of 1,500 for appearances by the likes of John Philip Sousa and William Jennings Bryan during annual 10-day seasons.

In 1917, a new domed structure was built at the site, but it fell into disrepair after the Chautauqua movement died out in the 1920s. In 1935, the similarity of the remaining wall of the then-roofless Chautauqua building to Elizabethan theatres inspired Southern Oregon University drama professor Angus L. Bowmer to propose using it to present plays by Shakespeare. Ashland city leaders loaned him a sum "not to exceed $400" (approximately equivalent to $7,459 in 2019) to present two plays as part of the city's Independence Day celebration. However, they pressed Bowmer to add boxing matches to cover the expected deficit. Bowmer agreed, feeling such an event was in perfect keeping with the bawdiness of Elizabethan theatre. The Works Progress Administration helped construct a makeshift Elizabethan stage on the Chautauqua site, and confidently billing it as the "First Annual Oregon Shakespearean Festival", Bowmer presented Twelfth Night on July 2 and July 4, 1935, and The Merchant of Venice on July 3, directing and playing the lead roles in both plays himself. Reserved seats cost $1, with general admission of $.50 for adults and $.25 for children (approximately equivalent to $19, $9, and $5 in 2019). Ironically, the profit from the plays covered the losses the boxing matches incurred.

The Festival has continued ever since (excepting 1941–1946 while Bowmer served in World War II and most of 2020 and 2021 due to the COVID-19 pandemic). It quickly developed a reputation for quality productions. Angus Bowmer's first wife Lois served as art director, creating both costumes and scenery during the formative years of the Festival from 1935 to 1940. In 1939, OSF took a production of The Taming of the Shrew to the Golden Gate International Exposition in San Francisco that was nationally broadcast on radio. The lead actress, learning at the last minute the broadcast would be to a national audience, suffered a panic attack, was rushed to the hospital, and the stand-in took over. The scripts didn't arrive on the set until three minutes before air time. The festival was the subject of the first article in the first issue of Shakespeare Quarterly, published in 1950.

The Festival achieved widespread national recognition when, from 1951 to 1973, under the direction of Andrew C. Love (1894–1987), NBC broadcast abbreviated performances each year that were carried by more than 100 stations nationally and, after 1954, on Armed Forces Radio and Radio Free Europe. The programs won favorable reviews from critics that drew audiences to the Festival from around the country. The programs led Life magazine to do a story on the Festival in 1957, bringing even more people to the plays. The NBC programs and the subsequent attention go a long way to explaining how a tiny out-of-the-way timber town in the Northwest became a theatrical and tourist Mecca.

Angus L. Bowmer retired in 1971, and leadership of the Festival passed to Jerry Turner, who widened the Festival repertory to production of classics by the likes of Molière, Ibsen, and Chekhov. When Turner retired in 1991, actor/director Henry Woronicz took control through 1996. OSF then recruited Libby Appel from the highly respected Indiana Repertory Theatre. She served as Artistic Director from 1996 through 2007. Bill Rauch succeeded Libby Appel as Artistic Director, serving from 2008 to 2019. He incorporated musicals and non-western plays into the annual selection, and sought connections between classic plays and contemporary concerns. He also started the Black Swan Lab in which 15–20 OSF actors developed new works for the stage. Inspired by Shakespeare's 37 plays, Rauch also initiated a 10-year program to commission up to 37 new plays collectively called American Revolutions: The United States History Cycle, 32 of which have been commissioned and ten of these have reached the stage, several to great acclaim including Tony awards. Nataki Garrett served as director from 2020 to 2022; since 2023, the director is Tim Bond.

Bing Crosby served as an honorary director of the Festival from 1949 to 1951. Charles Laughton visited in 1961, saying "I have just seen the four best productions of Shakespeare that I have ever seen in my life." Laughton begged to play King Lear, but died in 1962 before he could fulfill the dream. Stacy Keach was a cast member in 1962 and 1963. Duke Ellington and his orchestra presented a benefit concert in 1966 that brought many luminaries to Ashland.

1952 saw the birth of a tradition following the curtain call ending the last outdoor play of each season. Company members, not just actors, each carrying a candle, silently enter the darkened theatre to the traditional English folk tune Greensleeves. A company member selected for the honor speaks Prospero's words from Act IV Scene I of the Tempest beginning, "Our revels now are ended. These our actors, As I foretold you, were all spirits and Are melted into air, into thin air…" On completion of the speech, all extinguish the flames and file silently out of the theatre.

The tradition of opening the outdoor season with a Feast of Will (originally the Feasting of the Tribe of Will) was initiated in 1956 in Lithia Park with Miss Oregon and then-state senator Mark Hatfield attending.

The City of Portland approached OSF in the late 1970s about joining the art scene there, leading to the building of a new center in Portland. In 1986, OSF was again approached about producing in the new Portland Center for the Performing Arts, leading to the launch in November 1988 of a season of five plays including Shaw's Heartbreak House and Shakespeare's Pericles, Prince of Tyre, the first of four productions that transferred to or from Ashland. At the invitation of the City of Portland, OSF established a resident theatre in the Portland Center for the Performing Arts in 1988. It became independent in 1994 as Portland Center Stage. Those six seasons ran November–April, allowing many OSF company members to work in both cities. In 1990–1991 Portland imported rotating repertory from OSF, a company of 10 actors performing 43 roles.

In 1986, the OSF received the President's Volunteer Action Award; in 1987 it initiated Daedalus, a fundraiser to help victims of HIV/AIDS that has continued annually ever since.

A second theatre, the indoor Angus Bowmer Theatre (see below), opened in 1970, enabling OSF to expand its season into the spring and fall; within a year, attendance tripled to 150,000. By 1976, the festival was filling 99% of its seats while offering some 275 performances of eight plays each season. In 1977, the Festival opened a third theatre, dubbed the Black Swan (see below), in what originally was an auto dealership, and attendance reached 300,000. By 1979, the year Bowmer died, the Festival was offering the now customary 11 plays a season.

In 1983 OSF won both its first Tony Award for outstanding achievement in regional theatre and the National Governors' Association Award for its distinguished service to the arts, the first ever to a performing arts organization. In 1988, the Oregon Shakespearean Festival was renamed the Oregon Shakespeare Festival.

In 1997, the OSF-commissioned The Magic Fire was presented at the John F. Kennedy Center and named by Time among the year's best plays. In 2002, the Thomas Theatre (see below) replaced the Black Swan as the venue for intimate or experimental productions in a Black box theatre. In 2003, Time named OSF as the second best regional theatre in the United States (Chicago's Goodman Theater was first).

The Festival opened the 2020 season on February 28 with performances of A Midsummer Night's Dream, Peter and the Starcatcher, and The Copper Children in the Angus Bowmer Theatre. Bring Down the House (a two-part adaptation of Shakespeare’s Henry VI plays) was presented in the Thomas Theatre. However, on March 11 the Covid-19 pandemic forced closing of OSF for the rest of the season.

With the pandemic seeming to moderate, the Shakespeare Festival announced an April to December schedule of live performances for 2022 as follows. Once on This Island in the Angus Bowmer Theatre, unseen in the Thomas Theatre, How I Learned What I Learned, in the Angus Bowmer Theatre, The Tempest in the Allen Elizabethan Theatre, Revenge Song in the Allen Elizabethan Theatre, King John in the Angus Bowmer Theatre, Confederates in the Thomas Theatre, It’s Christmas, Carol! in the Angus Bowmer Theatre. In addition, OSF presented The Cymbeline Project, a multi-episode, digital adaptation of the Shakespeare play.

In April 2023, OSF announced an emergency fundraising campaign as the company was in financial crisis and needed to raise $2.5 million to continue the season as planned. By June, the fundraising effort had exceeded its goal. Artistic director Nataki Garrett resigned on May 5, 2023, with Octavio Solis stepping in to help search for a replacement. Tim Bond of TheatreWorks Silicon Valley was named new artistic director on July 6, 2023. Tim had previously served as an associate artistic director under Libby Appel.

== Green Show ==
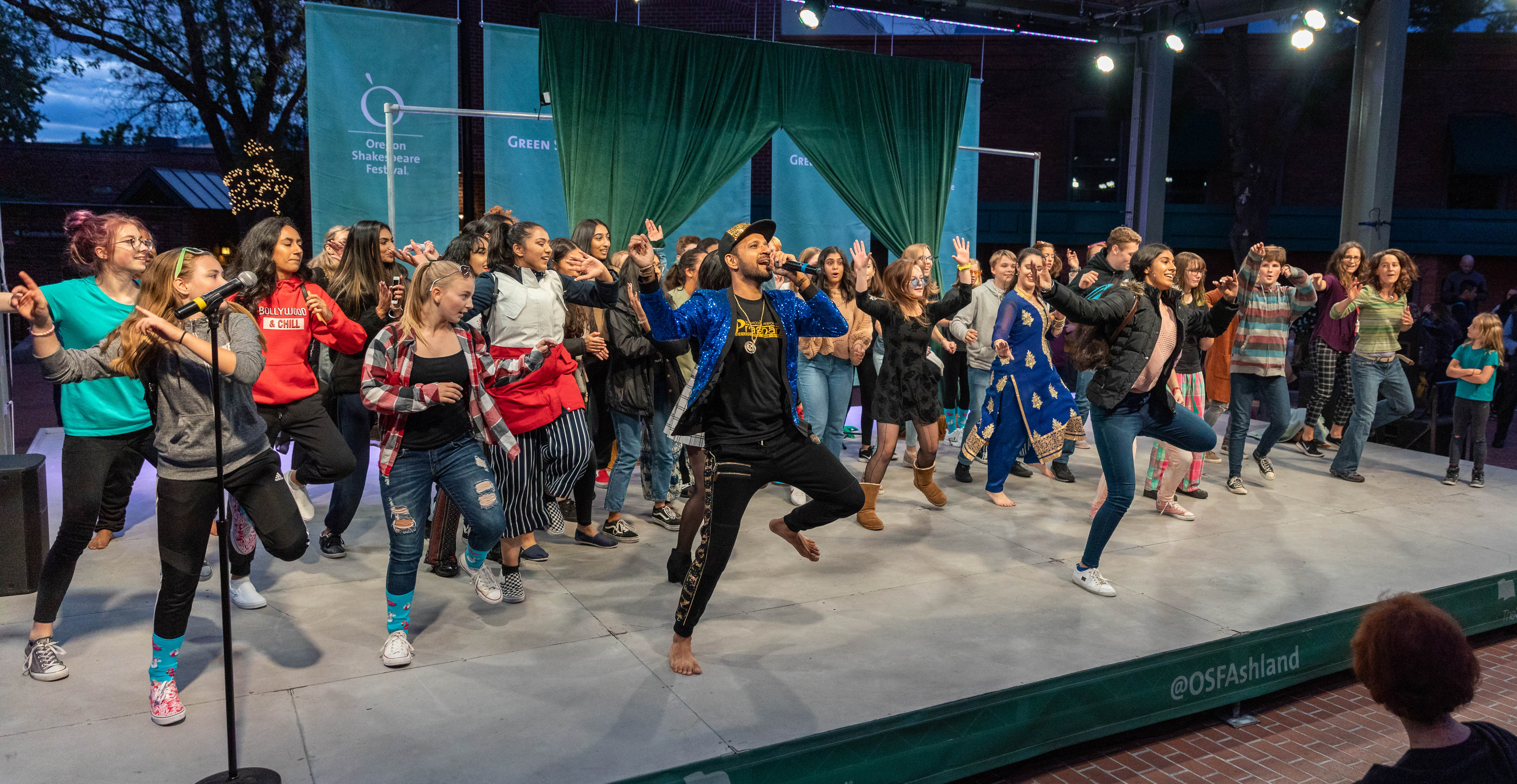
DJ Prashant and Jai Ho! perform at the Green Show, 2019.

In addition to the plays, since 1951 a free outdoor "Green Show" drawing audiences in the hundreds, often including non-playgoers, precedes the evening plays from June through September, Wednesday through Saturday nights, from a modular steel stage with a sprung floor for the dancers, a removable wheelchair ramp for performers with disabilities, and built-in storage facilities that eliminate carting equipment from and to distant storage facilities. Originally, it offered Elizabethan music and dancers. From 1966 until 2007 it consisted of three Renaissance-themed shows in rotation inspired by the plays showing in the Allen Elizabethan Theatre. Beginning in 1990, live music was supplied by resident ensemble The Terra Nova Consort, with numerous guest musicians, and Elizabethan dancers. In 1998, Terra Nova was joined by modern dance troupe Dance Kaleidoscope. This collaboration continued through 2007.

In still another innovation by Bill Rauch, the Green Show was revamped in 2008. The shows now vary widely with performers such as a dance group from Mexico or India one night, clowns doing ballet on stilts the next, and a classical music quartet on another. A fire show, juggler, or magician might be seen along with improv, metal, or rock-n-roll variations on Shakespeare. Individual performers, groups, choirs, bands, and orchestras may present Afro-Cuban, baroque, blues, classical, contemporary, cowboy, funk, gospel, hip-hop, jazz, mariachi, marimba, poetry, marionette, renaissance, or salsa, sometimes combined in unexpected ways.

== Economic importance ==
As suggested by the table below, OSF has a major economic impact in a town of only 20,000. That impact stems from direct sales of tickets but also expenditures at some 125 restaurants (a variety and density per resident similar to that in New York and Paris), hotels and motels in Ashland, and shops (second to last row of the table). These in turn create further economic activity, the economists’ “multiplier effect” that measures how often each dollar is spent on further local goods and services, estimated at 2.9 for OSF, resulting in the figures shown in bottom row of the table.

Caption: Economic Impact of the Oregon Shakespeare Festival
Year	2013	2015	2018
Plays performed	n/a	786	811
Tickets sold	407,787	390,380	362,838
Individual patrons	108,388	103,380	123,074
Average plays per patron	3.76	3.76	2.94
Direct expenditures	$86,768,108	$90,515,710	$89,773,545
Multiplier effect	$251,627,515	$262,495,559	$260,244,545

Differences from year to year are largely accounted for by variations in seating configurations in the theaters and total number of performances including occasional cancellation of outdoor performances due to wind born smoke from distant forest fires, particularly in 2018.

In addition to its economic importance to the region, OSF is an active community member. It often participates in Ashland's Martin Luther King celebration, Juneteenth celebration of the Emancipation Proclamation, and Fourth of July Parade. The Green Show is free. The Daedalus Project, managed by company members since 1987 in support of HIV/AIDS charitable organizations, traditionally featured a morning fun run, an afternoon play reading, an "arts and treasures" sale and an evening variety show and underwear parade.

In 2016, the Festival hosted the fifth biennial national Asian American Theater Conference and Festival. In addition to a full slate of conference sessions during the week, the event included six original plays, five play readings, and three Green Shows (see above). Participants also had an opportunity to see several regular Festival performances, two of which had an Asian setting and one an Asian-American theme.

== OSF campus ==
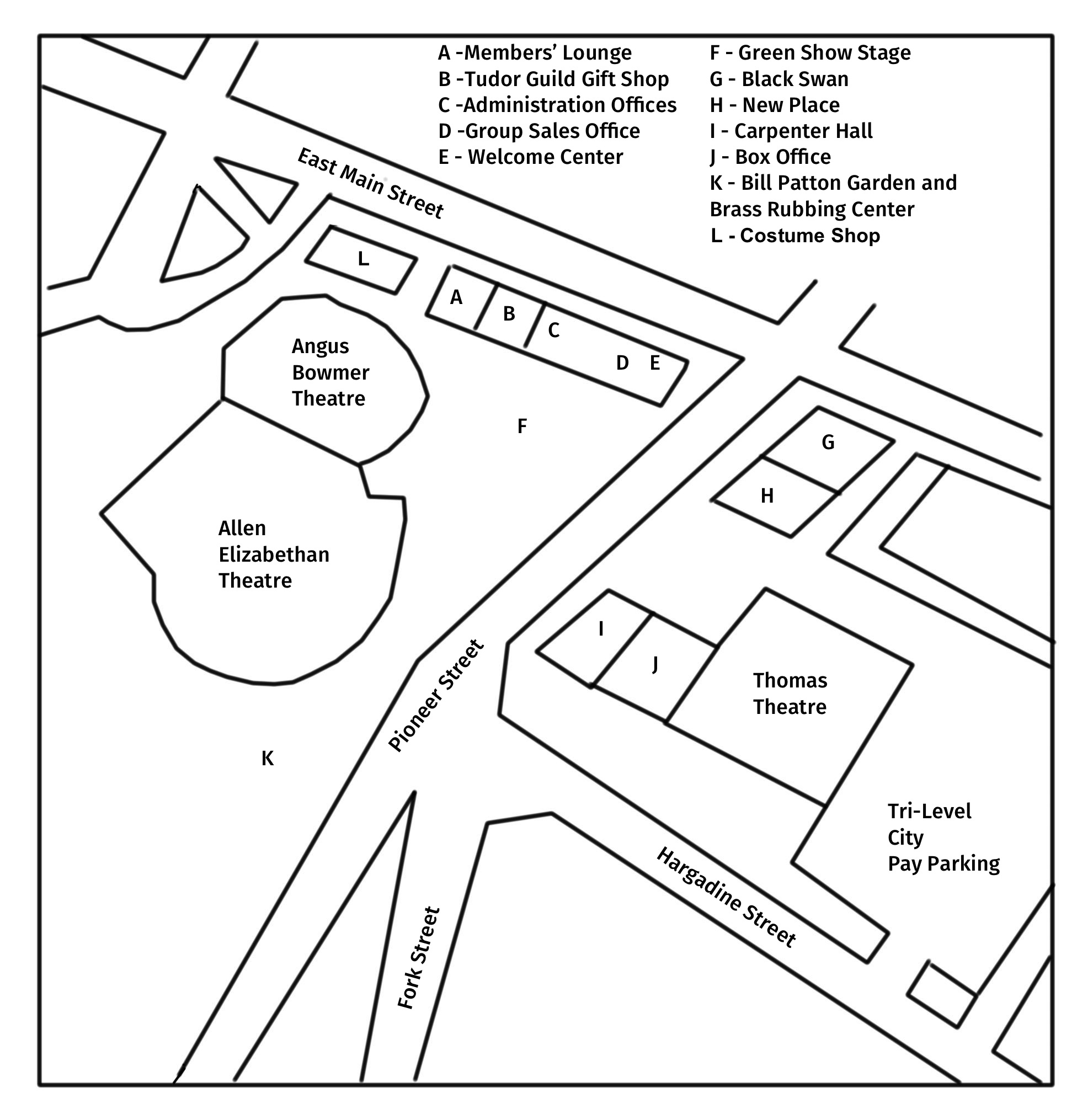
A sketch map of the Oregon Shakespeare Festival campus

The Oregon Shakespeare Festival occupies a 4-acre (16,000 m^{2}) campus adjacent to Lithia Park and the Plaza in Ashland, Oregon. The primary buildings are the three theatres, Carpenter Hall, and the Camps, Pioneer, and Administration buildings, all surrounding an open central court locally known as "The Bricks" that ties everything together into an architecturally coherent whole and facilitates movement. It also provides a stage for the nightly Green Shows (see above) from June through September. The Black Swan (G), now serves as a laboratory for the development of new plays. Off-campus buildings include the production facility, classrooms, the Hay Patton Rehearsal Center, and costume storage and rental facilities described below.

=== Allen Elizabethan Theatre ===
The Allen Elizabethan Theatre has evolved since the founding of the Oregon Shakespeare Festival when the first performance of Twelfth Night was presented on July 2, 1935.

==== Original Elizabethan Theatre ====
The design for the first outdoor OSF Elizabethan Theatre was sketched by Angus L. Bowmer based on his recollection of productions at the University of Washington in which he had acted while a student. Ashland, Oregon obtained WPA funds in 1935 to build it within the 12-foot (3.7 m) circular walls that remained in the roofless shell of the abandoned Chautauqua theatre. Bowmer extended the walls to reduce the stage width to fifty-five feet, and painted the extensions to resemble half-timbered buildings. He designed a thrust stage—one projecting toward the audience—with a balcony. Two columns helped divide the main stage into forestage, middle stage, and inner stage areas. Illustrating the improvised nature of it all, actors doubled as stage hands, stage lighting was housed in coffee cans, and string beans were planted along the walls to improve sound quality. Fifty-cent general admission seating was on benches just behind the one-dollar reserved seating on folding chairs. This theatre was torn down during World War II.

==== Second Elizabethan Theatre ====
The second outdoor Elizabethan Theatre was built in 1947 from plans drawn up by University of Washington drama professor John Conway. The main stage became trapezoidal, with entries added on either side, and windows added above them flanking the balcony stage. A low railing gave a finished appearance to the forestage. Chairs arranged to improve sight lines replaced bench seating. Backstage areas were added gradually and haphazardly, until the ramshackle result was ordered torn down as a fire hazard in 1958.

==== Current Allen Elizabethan Theatre ====
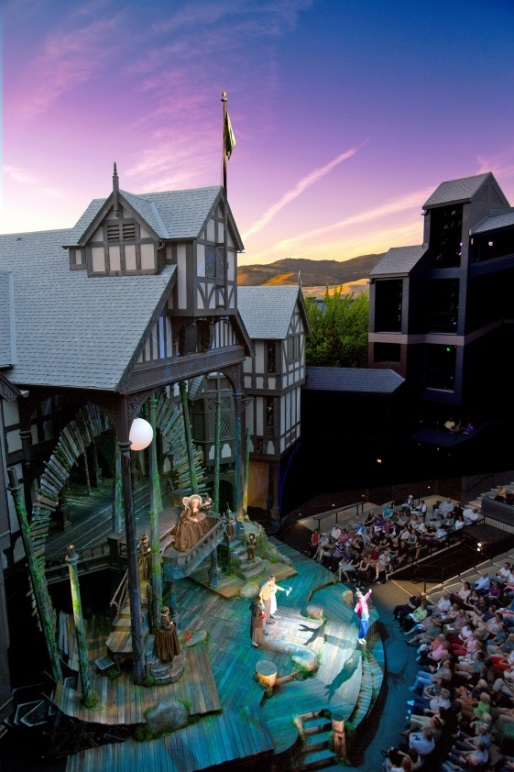
The theatre in 2014

The next year saw the opening of the current outdoor theatre, whose name was changed from Elizabethan to Allen Elizabethan Theatre in October 2013. Patterned on London's 1599 Fortune Theatre and designed by Richard L. Hay, it incorporated all the stage dimensions mentioned in the Fortune contract. The trapezoidal stage was retained but the façade was extended to three stories, resulting in a forestage, middle stage, inner below, inner above (the old balcony), and a musicians' gallery. The wings were provided with second-story windows. Each provides acting areas, creating many staging possibilities. A pitched, shingled roof enhances the half-timbered façade. A windowed gable was extended from the center of the roof to cover and define the middle stage. Just before each performance, an actor opens the gable window, and in keeping with Elizabethan tradition signaling a play in progress, runs a flag up the pole to the sound of a trumpet and doffs his cap to the audience.

The result is an approximate replica of the Fortune Theatre. The known but incomplete dimensions apply only to the stage. The original specifications sometimes say no more than "to be built like the Globe," for which there are no plans or details. The remotely operated lighting, on scaffolding on either side of the stage, of course did not exist in the original, and the current site rather than the original architecture largely determined the shape of the auditorium. Twelve hundred seats in slightly offset arcs ascend the original hillside, giving an excellent view of the stage from each seat. The old Chautauqua theatre walls, now ivy-covered, remain as the outer perimeter of the theatre.

The $7.6 million Paul Allen Pavilion was added in 1992. It houses a control room, and audience services including rental of infrared hearing devices, blankets, pillows, and food and drink, both of which are allowed in the auditorium. Several hundred seats were moved to a balcony and two boxes, further improving sightlines and acoustics. Vomitoria (colloquially, "voms"), the traditional name for entryways for actors from under the seating area, were added and the lighting scaffolds were eliminated.

=== Angus Bowmer Theatre ===
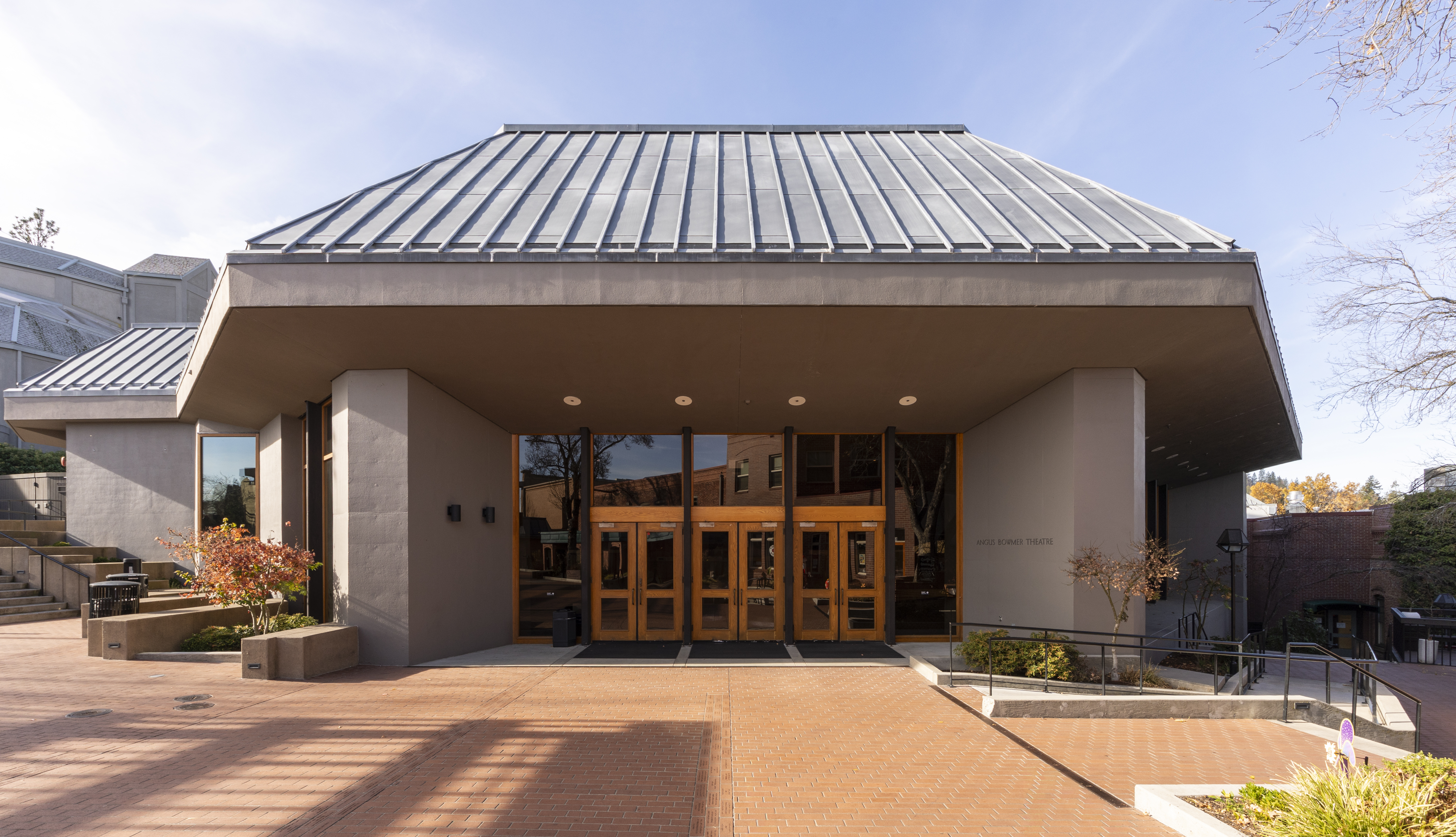
Angus Bowmer Theatre in 2025

An April 1968 report by the Bureau of Business and Economic Research of the University of Oregon pointed to the lost economic opportunity represented by the thousands of people the Oregon Shakespeare Festival was turning away each year. It further noted that the Festival had become an important economic engine for southern Oregon, and recommended addition of an indoor theatre. This led the City of Ashland to apply to the Economic Development Administration of the Department of Commerce in Fall 1968 for a $1,792,000 project grant with the Angus Bowmer Theatre as the keystone. The plan also called for a parking building, a remodeled administration building and box office, a scene shop and exhibit hall that later would become the OSF Black Swan, landscaping, and street realignment. $896,000 was approved in April 1969, to match an equal amount to be raised through private donations. The fund drive quickly exceeded its goal and ground for the new theatre was broken on December 18, 1969.

The theatre was ready just five months later and opened with a production of Rosencrantz and Guildenstern Are Dead, selected to recognize the Shakespearean origin of the Festival but to signal Festival readiness to broaden its horizons by incorporating modern plays into its repertoire. Reinforcing that signal, The Fantasticks and You Can't Take it with You were also presented during that first six-week season.

The Angus Bowmer Theatre seats between 592 and 610 patrons depending on configuration. Although about half the size of the outdoor theatre, it more than doubled audience capacity by making it possible to hold matinee performances and to extend the season into spring and fall.

The design by Richard L. Hay and architects Kirk, Wallace and McKinley of Seattle and contractor Robert D. Morrow, Inc., of Salem, Oregon was at once basic, flexible, functional, and innovative. All seats are within 55 feet (17 m) of the stage, arranged with only two side aisles and wide spaces between rows. Dark colors resist reflection and draw the eye to the stage. The forestage is on a hydraulic lift system that can emulate the thrust stage of the OSF Allen Elizabethan Theatre, form a more conventional proscenium front that can move below auditorium floor level to form an orchestra pit, or drop two stories for storage of equipment or scenery. The walls of the auditorium can swing in to close down the playing area or open to accommodate larger productions.

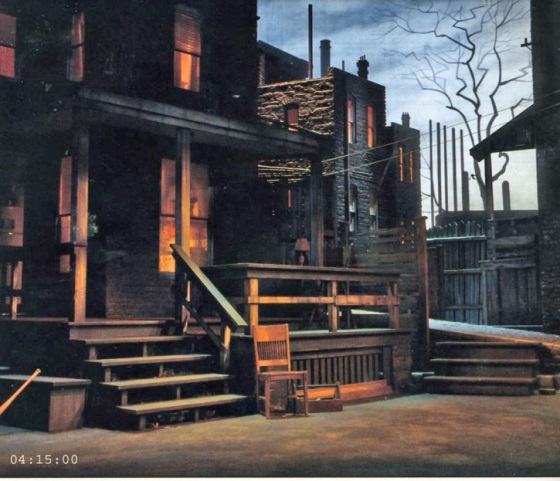
Angus Bowmer Theatre set design by Scott Bradley for August Wilson's Fences. Photo by Jenny Graham.

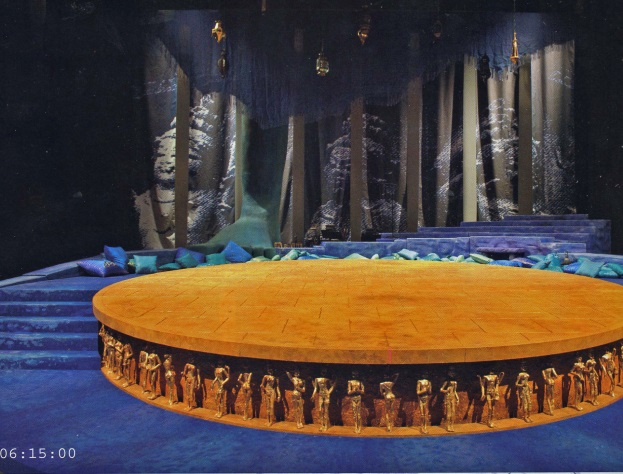
Angus Bowmer Theatre set design by Christopher Acebo for The Clay Cart. Photo by Jenny Graham.

Illustrating these characteristics, the first picture is the set for August Wilson's Fences. The second, taken two hours later on the same stage, is the set for the ancient Hindu classic The Clay Cart. Stage crews for the two indoor theatres must complete set changes of this scope six days a week between the end of a matinee and the "call" before the evening curtain and again the next morning in time for the matinee (the outdoor stage changes daily). This illustrates the nature of true repertory theater, which allows the playgoer to see different plays on the same day on the same stage, but requires designing and making sets to withstand constant rapid assembly, disassembly and return to accessible storage to await the next change of set. It also requires actors able to simultaneously play different parts in very different plays.

Just two hours before the 18 June 2011 matinee a crack was discovered in the seventy-foot long, six and one-half foot high main ceiling support beam of the Bowmer Theatre. Shows were immediately relocated to other venues as work progressed to repair the beam. A 598-seat tent, "Bowmer in the Park," was soon erected in Lithia Park adjacent to the Festival campus as a temporary replacement venue. A single set was designed and built to serve four very different shows, and the shows themselves were re-staged while keeping the artistic vision of each as intact as possible. Thirty-one performances were held in the tent and averaged 82% of capacity, generating approximately $650,000 in revenue against approximately $800,000 for the tent itself, $1,000,000 in lost revenue from ticket returns, and $330,000 in repair costs. The Bowmer reopened on 2 August, a month ahead of the initial estimate. The Festival filed an insurance claim for $3.58 million and received checks in March 2012 for $330,000 to cover the cost of repairs and $2.984 million covering much of the lost revenue, leaving about $200,000, primarily representing the cost of the temporary tent theatre itself, unresolved.

=== Black Swan ===
The Black Swan (G on the OSF campus map above) served as the Festival's third theatre from 1977 to 2001. The building, originally an automobile dealership, was bought in 1969 as a scene shop and rehearsal hall. Company members began using it to stage "midnight" readings for one another and invited friends who brought other friends. Artistic Director Jerry Turner recognized the opportunity to take risks with unconventional staging and subjects, and called for its development as a third OSF theatre. Fitting a theatre into the existing building was challenging. It could hold only 138 seats, all within five rows of the stage. There had to be, as designer Richard Hay put it, a "certain amount of tucking and squeezing." Each director had to solve the problem of an immovable roof support in the middle of the stage. For instance, in one production, it became a crucifix after adding a horizontal piece. The theatre reverted to its earlier roles in 2002 when it was replaced by the New Theatre, now renamed the Thomas Theatre. Among those roles are rehearsal space, meeting and audition rooms, classes, and since 2011 as a home for the Black Swan Lab (see above).

=== Thomas Theatre ===
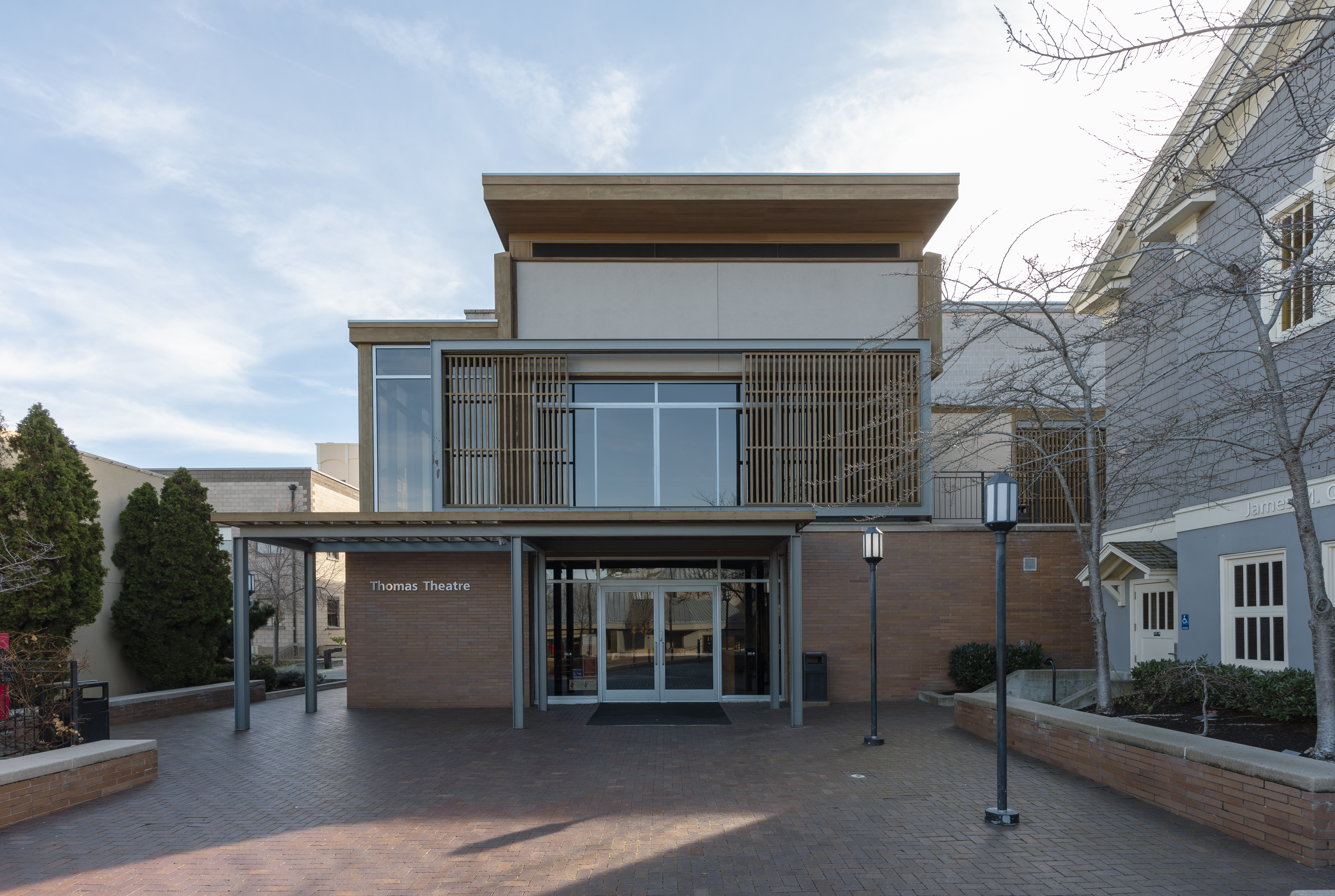
Entrance to the Thomas Theatre

The limitations stemming from adapting an existing building as the Black Swan led to the design and building of a third theatre that provided flexible seating and increased capacity while maintaining the intimacy of the Black Swan. Opened in March 2002 and originally named the New Theatre, it was renamed the Thomas Theatre in 2013 as a result of a generous $4.5 million gift from a group of donors. The name recognizes the contributions of longtime OSF development director Peter Thomas, who died in March 2010. The Thomas Theatre, a black box theater, expands the possibilities for experiment and innovation while maintaining the intimacy of the Black Swan, no seat being more than six rows from the stage.

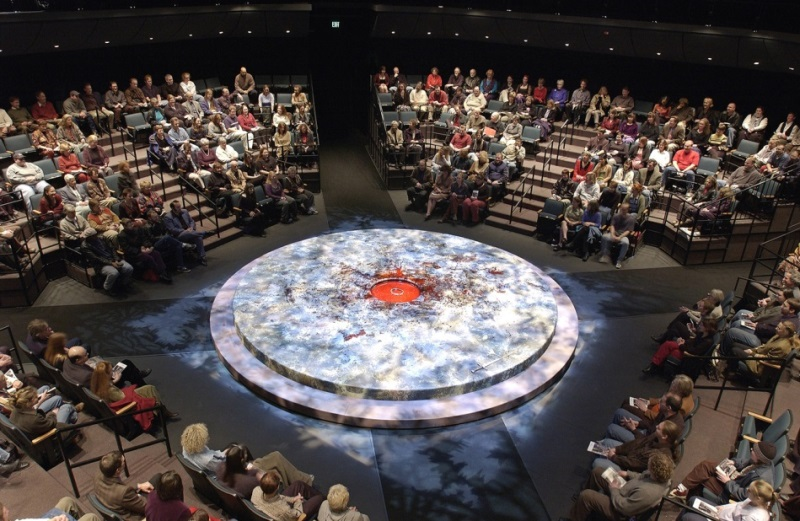
The arena seating and set for Macbeth, the opening performance in the Thomas Theatre.

Richard L. Hay designed the theatre space. Architects Thomas Hacker and Associates of Portland designed the building. The contractor was Emerick Construction, and acoustical engineering was provided by Dohn and Associates. The seats can be arranged in three configurations. In arena mode, a stage of 663 square feet (61.6 m^{2}) is surrounded on all four sides by 360 seats. In three-quarter thrust mode, a 710 square feet (66 m^{2}) stage is surrounded on three sides by 270 seats, and in avenue mode, a 1,236 square feet (114.8 m^{2}) stage provides 228 seats on two sides. There is a trap room under the stage and a fly loft at one end. A computer controls 300 circuits and over 400 lights of various types. The remainder of the building is given over to downstairs and upstairs lobbies, concessions, access distribution, archives (see below), storage, laundry room, green room, quiet room, warm-up room, dressing space for 18 actors, showers/restrooms, costume and wig rooms, stage manager's office, maintenance space, and storage for props and set pieces.

=== Other buildings ===
The Box Office (J on the OSF campus map above) is on the same courtyard as the Thomas Theatre. The Festival acquired the Administration Building (C) in April 1967. Forming the northern boundary of the campus, the building houses the artistic, business, community productions, development, education, group sales, literary (D), human resources offices, development, and the mailroom. The adjacent Camps Building (A) houses the members' lounge, communications and marketing offices, and a meeting room.

The Festival's costume production shop occupies the Pioneer Building at the northwest corner of campus and an annex in the Administration building. The staff creates the costumes and accessories in three main studios on the lower floor of the building and in an extension of the Administration Building. Also in this area are offices and fitting rooms for the costume designers and costume design assistants, a costume props area and a vented paint room. Upstairs is a dye room, lounge, laundry, storage room, and office. During the height of costume production each season, a wig shop and additional studio is open in the basement of the Angus Bowmer Theatre.

The Festival acquired Carpenter Hall (I) in October 1973, renovating it to accommodate lectures, concerts, rehearsals, meetings and Festival and community events. The Bill Patton Garden (K) provides the venue for free informal summer noon talks by OSF actors and staff. The Tudor Guild operated the Tudor Guild Gift Shop (B) and Brass Rubbing Center (K) for many years, both now operated by OSF itself, and will facilitate campus tours beginning in 2022. Just off campus, a purpose-equipped fitness center helps actors stay fit for physically demanding roles that often require acrobatics, fights, and pratfalls.

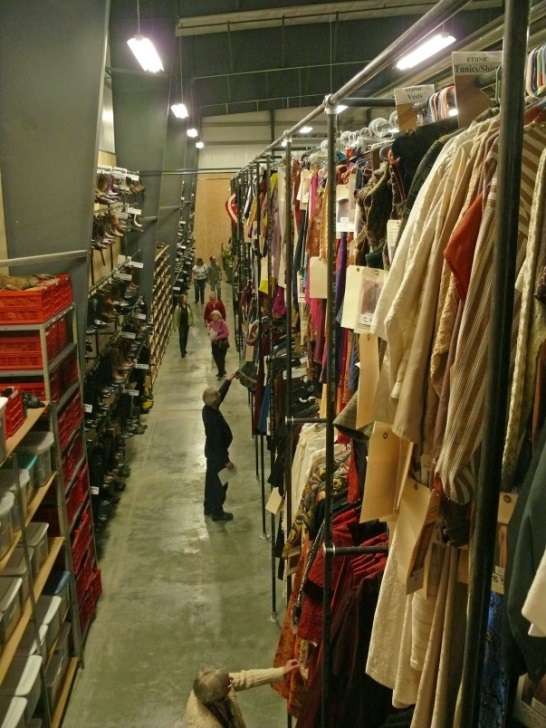
One aisle of the costume warehouse in the Talent production facility

In November 2013 the Festival completed the $7.2 million purpose-built 71,544 square feet (6,646.7 m^{2}) (6,646.7 m2) Production Building in neighboring Talent, Oregon now home to a multi-function staff. The building houses custom-designed technologically advanced set and prop construction and scene painting facilities. The scene shop has an extensive pit area that precisely duplicates the trap doors in the theatres themselves, allowing for precise sizing, testing of assembly and disassembly, and automating elevator cues. Lighting in the painting areas duplicates that in the theatres, guaranteeing desired colors. The building also houses OSF's costume warehouse and rental business, which has over 50,000 costumes and over 15,000 costume props such as armor, crowns, and wigs available for rent by other theatres, television and movie producers, and corporations.

With the removal of the scene construction shop in 2014 to the new Production Building, a thirteen-month transformation began of the old one into the Hay-Patton Rehearsal Center by demolishing everything except the masonry exterior and the steel framework and raising the second floor three feet. Following a plan developed by Ogden Roemer Wilkerson Architecture carried out by Adroit Construction at a cost of $4.4 million, it hosted its first rehearsal on 29 December 2015. The building is equipped with a sophisticated sound system and has six rehearsal halls, three of them some 3,000-square-foot (280 m^{2}), sufficient to precisely duplicate stages in any of the three Festival theatres. All six include fully sprung floors to prevent injuries when dancing, rehearsing stage combat, or similar physical activities. The LED lighting system is zoned and dimmable, the ceilings have steel tracks which allow for suspension of scenery, lights, loudspeakers, and even people. Some have additional features such as small conversation areas and dance-style mirrors. The building also includes a stage management office, a recording studio, a movement studio focused on the Feldenkrais Method, a studio for work on vocal technique, stamina, and dialect; a loading dock, a conference room, showers, two warmup spaces that double as small meeting rooms, two green rooms equipped with refrigerator, storage cases, sink, dishwasher, tables custom-made by the prop shop, and chairs.

== Organization ==
OSF is a non-profit corporation managed under US and Oregon law by a 32-member Board of Directors nominated and elected for eight-year terms. The endowment itself has a net worth in excess of $30 million that returns about $1.2 million to support the annual operating budget. It is managed by seven trustees who are selected for five-year terms by the Board of Directors.

In the past, OSF offered non-voting memberships at eleven levels beginning at $35, each with its own privileges. Starting in 2022, these have been replaced by a Change Makers donor program in eight categories starting at one dollar and providing for deep engagement. To further extend access to as many people as possible, 2022 ticket prices were reduced and now range from $35 to $75.

=== Professional staff ===
The paid staff is organized into artistic, production, education, administrative and development sections.

The Artistic Director selects the plays and directors for each season and chooses 70-120 actors, musicians and dancers. In August 2019, Nataki Garrett succeeded Bill Rauch as the sixth artistic director of the Oregon Shakespeare Festival. She earned her MFA in directing from the California Institute of the Arts and has more than 20 years experience as a theatre administrator, director, producer, playwright, educator, activist and mentor, most recently as acting artistic director of the Denver Center for the Performing Arts and Associate Dean of the undergraduate acting program at California Institute of the Arts School of Theater. Her forté and passion are fostering and developing new work. She has produced over 150 mainstage, black box, and developmental projects including world premieres of Book of Will, Two Degrees, Zoe's Perfect Wedding, The Great Leap, and American Mariachi. She directed the world premiere of Pussy Valley, and the U.S. premieres of Jefferson's Garden and BLKS. In her first effort in her new position, she directed the imaginatively staged 2019 Oregon Shakespeare production of How to Catch Creation.[8]

Once the plays have opened, the voice and text staff are on hand to help actors with vocal challenges that may arise, attend periodic performances to provide helpful ideas, work with understudies, teach voluntary voice classes to the acting company, provide ongoing professional development support in the form of project or individual session work, and participate in play selection and workshops for upcoming seasons.

Each play is also assigned an Intimacy Director, who works to ensure that actors feel emotionally and mentally safe when performing in intimate and emotionally demanding scenes, while also working to realize the director’s vision.

Programs specifically for teachers have included the five-day retreat, "Shakespeare in the Classroom" that emphasizes innovative and pedagogical methods to help teachers make the works of Shakespeare involving and accessible to contemporary students.

For those unable to come to the Festival, pairs of actors participate in the School Visit Program, initiated in 1971, which now reaches some 60,000 students primarily in four states, although it has made occasional visits to eight others. Each one-day visit includes two 50-minute performances and one two-hour or two one-hour workshops. Performances are a condensed version of one Shakespeare play, selected scenes from Shakespeare illustrating a single theme, or a combination of Shakespeare and other literature selected to meet the needs of the school being visited.

A partnership with Ashland High School initiated by student actors in 1993 grew into a longstanding collaboration between students and Festival professionals that has produced a significant number of actors and other theatre professionals over the years.

Programs of different lengths and formality to meet varied adult needs and interests have included Wake Up With Shakespeare, Shakespeare Comprehensive, Festival Noons, Prefaces, Prologues, Park Talks, Road Scholars, and "Unfolding Seminars."

OSF's Development Department has also educational opportunities through tours that have included two to England focused on Shakespeare, one to Greece and Turkey on Holland America Line's MS Rotterdam focused on the beginnings and history of theatre, and one along the coasts of France and Spain and to the Canary Islands on Cunard Line's Queen Mary 2. These tours feature an intensive schedule of lectures and interactive workshops with four to eight OSF staff and actors, as well as visits to local attractions.

The Administrative staff is supervised Acting Executive Director David Schmitz who follows past Executive Directors Paul Christy (2019–2020), Cynthia Rider (2013–2018), Paul Nicholson (1995–2012) and William Patton (1955–1995).

Administration supervises the physical plant (custodial services, maintenance, and security), accounting, IT, mail room, and receptionists. The Director of Marketing and Communications supervises the box office, membership services, archives (see below), publications and media, marketing, and audience services, which itself includes house managers, ushers, concessions, and access staff for handicapped patrons (see below). The Director of Development supervises institutional giving, major gifts, and the Change Makers donor program. The Director of Human Resources manages employees, volunteer and events programs (see below), safety, and a professional development program called FAIR (Fellowships, Assistantships, Internships, and Residencies) that provides students aspiring to a career in theatre with direct experience of best practices across all aspects of professional theatre. Fellows work directly with senior management while expanding their personal networks. Three residencies varying from four to eleven months are exclusive to the Dramaturgy and Literary Management Department. Twenty-five to thirty Assistantships annually provide hands-on opportunities in virtually every area of the organization by pairing recipients with an appropriate OSF staff member for an average of three months. Finally, 15–20 annual unpaid Internships of two to four months each provide emerging artists and administrators with hands-on experience by pairing them with a Festival staff member in an area of interest. Internships may fulfill academic requirements determined by recipient's home academic institution.

=== Archives ===
OSF archivists develop, preserve, and maintain a comprehensive collection of documents and oral histories, drawings and photographs, audio and video recordings, and artifacts pertaining to the artistic and administrative history and heritage of the Oregon Shakespeare Festival. Collecting, organizing, and preserving these materials of what otherwise is an ephemeral art form to archival standards is an ongoing effort aided in part by grants. The archives may be searched online.

Collections are available for research, although some collections have restrictions, and permission must be obtained for their use.

The Archives include Education department records from 1947 on and document the department's programming and structural evolution. Print materials include annual reports, brochures, calendars, correspondence, course handouts, course readings, news clippings, newsletters, photographs, posters, scripts, statistics and survey reports, study guides, and teacher information kits, guides, and resource kits. Audio and video recordings include radio broadcasts and school visit program performances.

In May 2013, the National Endowment for the Humanities awarded the Festival a $200,000 grant to digitize 2,649 deteriorating tapes, films and videos and to make them publicly available through its website and the YouTube platform. The collection spans the history of the Festival from its inception in 1935 through 2012 and comprises an unparalleled comprehensive record of Shakespearean and theatrical performance by a single U.S. theatre company. Included are full-length recordings of 541 of the 570 Festival productions from 1950 to 2012, including three or more varied interpretations of every play in the Shakespearean canon with exemplary casts before live audiences. The production recordings are supplemented by 44 adaptations broadcast on NBC radio, more than 100 hours of artist interviews, Shakespeare lectures by nationally and internationally renowned scholars and educators, production music, promotional recordings, and recordings of significant events in the company's history. Also included are the home movies of founder Angus Bowmer, Southern Oregon Normal School events and rare footage of the initial 1935 Festival season!

=== Publications ===
All playgoers are offered a complimentary Playbill with a synopsis of plays, casts, artist biographies, and directors' statements. Each year, the Festival publishes Teachers First! for school groups and Group Travel for adults, both providing information on the season's plays, including age suitability, the seasonal calendar, ordering, and discount information.

An annual Souvenir Program included photographic highlights of each play and special articles along with pictures and biographies of actors, playwrights, and the many people who work behind the scenes. A chart emphasizing the repertory nature of OSF lists all the actors and their parts in the plays.

The Festival also publishes a Bard Scorecard, a simple folder that lists all of William Shakespeare's plays, the years OSF produced them, and allows playgoers to check off which plays they've seen towards completing the canon.

=== Professional memberships ===
OSF is a constituent of Theatre Communications Group, the national service organization for the not-for-profit theatre world, and a member of the Shakespeare Theatre Association of America. It operates under contracts with Actors' Equity Association, The Union of Professional Actors and Stage Managers in the United States, the International Alliance of Theatrical Stage Employees, and the Stage Directors and Choreographers Society, Inc., an independent national labor union.
