= Jerry Turner (theater director) =

American theatre director (1927–2004)

Jerry Turner (1927–2004) served as artistic director of the Oregon Shakespeare Festival from 1971 to 1991. He transformed the festival from a summer program for semi-professional actors into one of the top regional theaters in the country by leading the Ashland, Oregon-based company beyond its Shakespearean repertoire. He produced plays by Bertold Brecht, Henrik Ibsen, George Bernard Shaw, and August Strindberg and added the Angus Bowmer Theatre in 1970 and the Black Swan in 1977 to the festival's original theater, the Elizabethan Stage.

== Biography ==
Jerry Turner was born in Loveland, Colorado during 1927. Turner earned a BA and MA at the University of Colorado and a PhD in theatre from the University of Illinois. He began his career at OSF as an actor in 1957 and as a director in 1959. From 1957 to 1964 he also was associate professor of drama and department chairman at Humboldt State College and from 1964 to 1970 he was professor and chairman of the department of drama at the University of California, Riverside. In 1970 he received a UC Humanities Institute Fellowship to study theatre in Sweden. He learned Swedish, and later learned Norwegian, and returned to the U.S. to become Oregon Shakespeare Festival's second producing director, then its artistic director (a title change only), retiring in 1991. Turner died of heart failure on September 2, 2004.

== Oregon Shakespeare Festival ==
Turner directed more than 40 productions at OSF, including The Iceman Cometh, Julius Caesar, King Lear, Long Day's Journey into Night, Major Barbara, Macbeth, Mother Courage and Her Children, Pericles Prince of Tyre, The Tempest, and The White Devil. He directed a number of his own translations of Swedish and Norwegian plays including The Dance of Death, An Enemy of the People, The Father, Ghosts, Peer Gynt, Rosmersholm, and The Wild Duck.

Turner loved both classical texts and new work, and always sought to find in both ways to surprise and stimulate audiences. He was considered both a risk-taker and a traditionalist. "Expanding an audience's horizons doesn't necessarily mean doing new work," he said in a 1987 interview for the festival's program notes. The danger isn't so much not doing new work as in ignoring the old work. Besides, just because a play was written a long time ago doesn't make it old."

== Awards and recognition ==
Under Turner's leadership, OSF received the Antoinette Perry Award (Tony Award) in 1983. Turner also received an honorary Doctorate in Humane Letters at Pacific University in 1985, the George Norlin Alumni Award from the University of Colorado, Boulder in 1989, the Oregon Governor's Award for the Arts in 1991, and the St. Olav's Medal from King Harald V of Norway in 1996.
