= Hyatt Music Theater =

Theater in California, US, 1964–2008

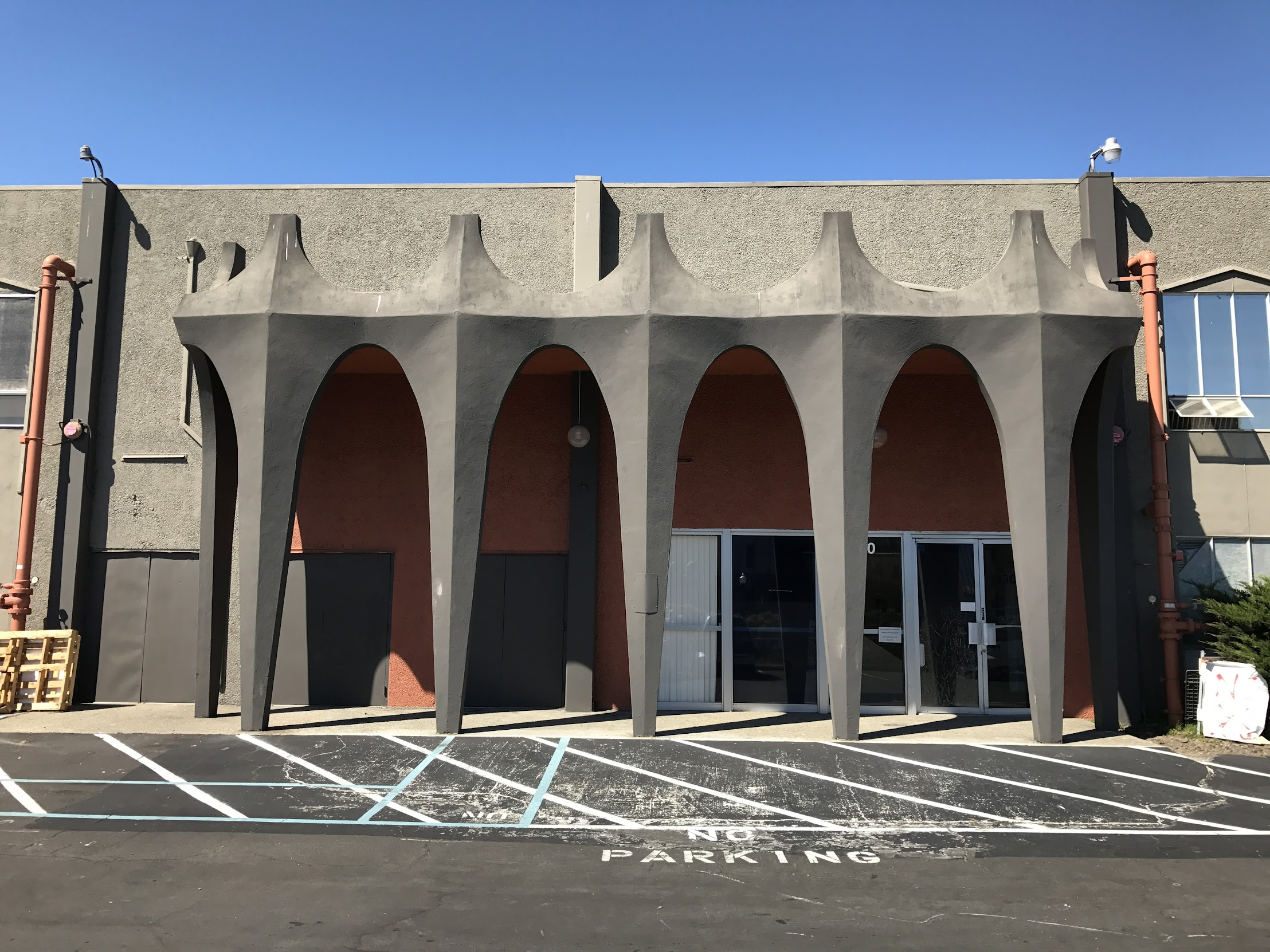
- Hyatt Music Theater, 2016
- Former names: Hyatt Cinema Theatre (March 29, 1966–?); CineArts at Hyatt (?–2008)
- Location: 1307 Bayshore Highway, Burlingame, California, United States
- Coordinates: 37.5938°N 122.3628°W
- Capacity: 2,500

Construction
- Opened: September 15, 1964
- Closed: December 31, 1965
- Architect: Vincent G. Raney, Robert M. Blunk

The Hyatt Music Theater was a performing arts venue active from September 15, 1964 until December 31, 1965 in Burlingame, California, U.S.. It had 2,500 seats. The midcentury modern building was originally designed by architects Vincent G. Raney and Robert M. Blunk. The original concept was as a dinner theater, similar to the Circle Star Theater in nearby San Carlos.

It became the Hyatt Cinema Theatre on March 29, 1966 under Anza Pacific Corp., and was open until 2008. The movie theater was reconfigured by architect Vincent G. Raney, and had 950 seats. In later years it was called CineArts at Hyatt.
