= California Theatre (Pittsburg, California) =

Theatre in California

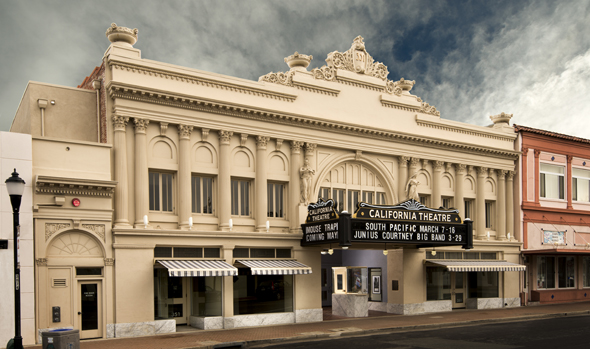
- California Theatre (2014)
- Interactive map of California Theatre
- Location: 351 Railroad Ave, Pittsburg, California, US
- Coordinates: 38.0330°N 121.8834°W
- Operator: Anthony Lane-Cotroneo
- Seating type: Orchestra, Balcony
- Capacity: 981
- Type: Indoor theatre
- Public transit: Pittsburg Center station: Tri Delta Transit: Pittsburg Route 381

Construction
- Opened: 1920
- Renovated: 2008, 2022
- Architect: Albert W. Cornelius

Website
- pittsburgcaliforniatheatre.com

The California Theatre is a historic theatre in Old Town Pittsburg, California.

== History ==
Designed by architect Albert W. Cornelius, the California Theatre was built by G.E. Seeno and Columbo at a cost of $200,000. The theatre opened on May 4, 1920, as a venue for live vaudeville performances and silent films. It was owned and operated by local theatre moguls Sylvester and Salvatore Enea. Adults paid $0.25 for entry, while admission for children cost $0.15.

During its heyday, notable performers included Flash Gordon and cowboy heroes Ray "Crash" Corrigan, Tim Holt, Tex Ritter and Fred Scott. The theatre would often host national touring acts the evening before their opening night in San Francisco.

The theatre featured a Leatherby-Smith pipe organ that was originally installed in 1924, and played during silent films and between shows. It was later replaced in November 1928 with Robert Morton style 23N organ, which remained on-site until 1948.

The theatre showed its last film in February 1954 before closing.

The City of Pittsburg bought the theatre in 1971. Over the years, the building fell into disrepair through years of neglect and sustained heavy water damage. The ceiling subsequently collapsed into the abandoned auditorium. The original marquee was removed in 1975.

== Restoration ==
In 1994, the City began a major clean up and stabilisation of the deteriorating theater.

In 2008, a $7.6 million renovation was undertaken. Restoration artist Beate Bruhl restored the artwork throughout the theatre. Fixtures were fabricated to match historical photographs of the original building. A replica of the 1920 marquee was installed in 2010. The theatre reopened on January 19, 2013.

In January 2019, after an absence of 70 years, the 1928 Robert Morton organ was restored.

An additional $2 million restoration of the balcony area was completed in 2022.

Today, the auditorium features a 981 seat capacity. It hosts theatre productions, concerts, comedy shows, films, dance performances, community events, and is rented for private events.

== Architecture ==
The theatre was designed in classic revival style, featuring Corinthian columns, sculpted urns and figurative sculptures. It is claimed that the design of the theatre was inspired by the Palais Garnier, albeit on a much smaller, less grand and ornate scale. The theatre was later modernised to incorporate many of the Art Deco features present today. The auditorium features a large art-deco chandelier with a beaux-artes style ceiling decoration and a grand balcony.

== Productions ==
In July 2023, the City of Pittsburg approved a new three-year agreement for the operation of the theatre. The theatre is currently operated by Anthony Lane-Cotroneo of Entertainment Lane Inc.

Recent performances have featured Tony Danza, Pete Escovedo, Pasquale Esposito, Taye Diggs, Christopher Titus, John Witherspoon, George Lopez and Sinbad.

=== Pittsburg Theatre Company ===
In 2012, the Pittsburg Theatre Company was designated as the resident theatre company of the California Theatre.

Now in its 44th season, the Pittsburg Theatre Company continues its annual performances at the California Theatre. Productions have included Steel Magnolias, Fiddler on the Roof, The Addams Family and It Shoulda Been You.

== Gallery ==
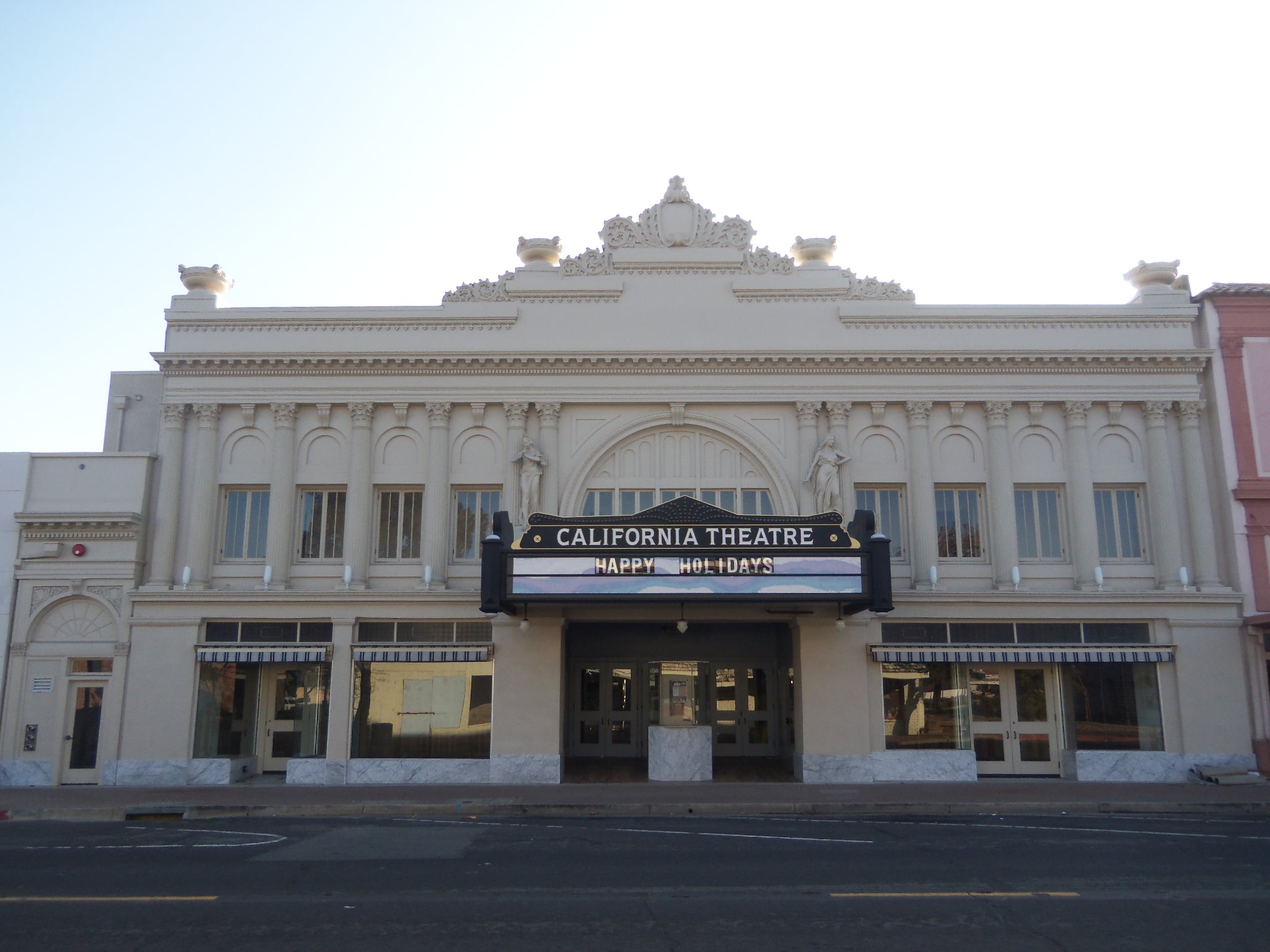

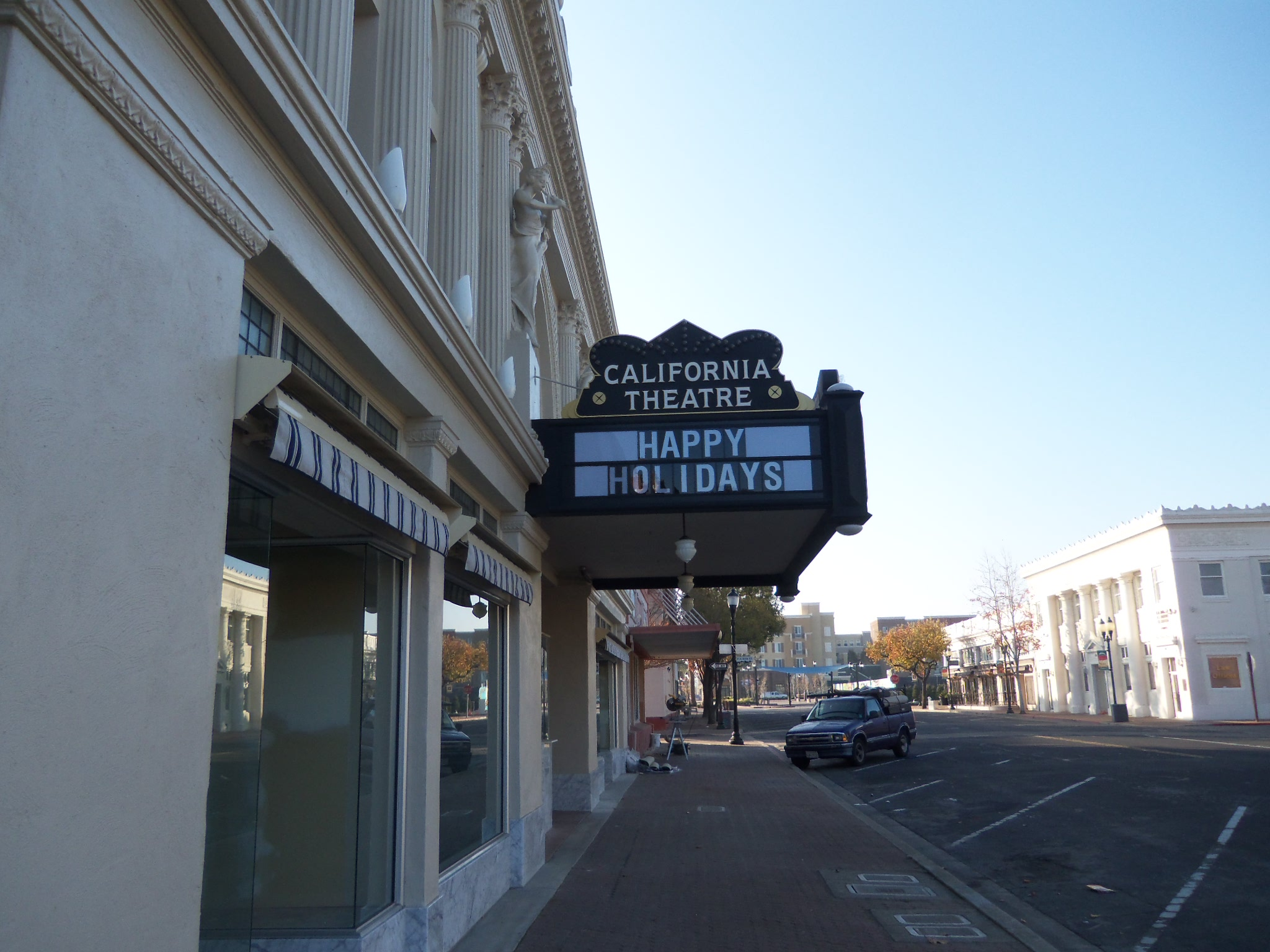

== See also ==
- List of theatres in California
- Pittsburg, California
