= Circle Star Theater =

Performing arts venue in San Carlos, California

Coordinates: 37°29′52″N 122°14′26″W

- Interactive map of Circle Star Theater
- Location: 2 Circle Star Way, San Carlos, California, United States
- Capacity: 3,743
- Type: dinner theater

Construction
- Opened: 1964
- Closed: December 1993

The Circle Star Theater was a performing arts venue active from 1964 until 1993, located at 2 Circle Star Way in San Carlos, San Mateo County, California, U.S.. Its name is based on it being a theater in the round, featuring a rotating circular stage with none of its 3,743 seats further than 50 feet (15 m) from the stage. Unlike similar venues across the United States, the Circle Star Theatre stage had the ability to rotate in either direction without limit, thanks to the slip ring and brush system that supplied electrical/audio to and from the stage.

== History ==
Its original concept was as a dinner theater, similar to the Hyatt Music Theater in nearby Burlingame. On March 9, 1964, ground-breaking took place, financially backed by Debbie Reynolds, Steve Allen, Sammy Davis Jr. and others. It was on 9.5 acres (3.8 ha) of land, with a parking lot that held 1,000 vehicles. It was planned for the Circle Star Theater to hold 3,300 seats, and at the time of opening the capacity around 3,743. To build it costed US $2.8 million (which is roughly US $29066524 with inflation). In 1964, the Circle Star Theater opened with Jane Powell and Michael Evan starring in My Fair Lady. On October 13, 1964, Opening Night was celebrated.

In 1971, the revolving stage was introduced, and the theatre was purchased by Marquee Entertainment, run by Don Jo Medlevine of the famed Chicago nightclub Chez Paree. Marquee Entertainment booked Las Vegas acts such as Frank Sinatra, Sammy Davis, Jr., Dean Martin, and Liberace, among many others. In the mid-1970s the theatre was kept solvent by booking Motown acts to increase its diversity.

Lewis & Dare Productions hosted many Broadway touring shows, such as The Odd Couple, with Ernest Borgnine and Don Rickles.

Don Jo Medlevine sold the Circle Star Theater to Leonard Bloom. In 1987, Bloom sold the theater to a local car dealer, Jim Burney. The new owner did not have the same elite relationships with the top entertainers as Bloom had, but leased to a booking agent, later locking them out in December 1993 and ending the entertainment. The building went into foreclosure. In 1995, the Circle Star Theater memorabilia was sold off at auction after a building sale.

The building caught fire on April 18, 1997, damaging much of the backstage area, though by this time plans had already been made for its demolition. The theater was ultimately demolished to make way for the Circle Star Center, a complex containing two four-story office buildings and a small hotel. Since 2015 or 2014 Softbank owns the buildings and uses them as offices. The hotel is now an Extended Stay America.

== Performers ==
The following musicians, actors, and comedians are among those who appeared at the Circle Star:

- Air Supply
- Al Green
- Airto Moreira w/ George Duke
- Alec Baldwin
- America
- Andy Kaufman
- Andy Williams
- Aretha Franklin with King Curtis & the Kingpins
- Barry Manilow
- Barry White
- B. B. King
- Benny Goodman
- Big Brother and the Holding Company with "new" singer Janis Joplin
- Bill Cosby
- Bob and Ray
- Bob Goldthwait
- Bob Hope
- Bonnie Bramlett
- Bootsy Collins
- Boxcar Willie
- Bread
- Brenton Wood
- Buck Owens
- Bunny Wailer
- Burt Bacharach
- Cameo
- Canned Heat
- Carl Perkins
- Chaka Khan with Rufus
- Cheech and Chong
- Chet Atkins
- Chicago
- Chris LeDoux
- Chuck Berry
- Chuck Mangione
- Cleo Laine
- Con Funk Shun
- Conway Twitty
- Craig Chaquico
- Crystal Gayle
- Dan Seals
- Dave Chappelle
- DeBarge
- Diana Ross
- Dionne Warwick
- Don Ellis
- Donna Summer
- Doobie Brothers
- Doug E. Fresh
- Edgar Bergen and Charlie McCarthy
- Ella Fitzgerald
- Emmylou Harris and the Hot Band
- En Vogue
- Engelbert Humperdinck
- Exposé
- Fishbone
- Foreigner
- Frank Sinatra
- Frank Zappa
- Frankie Valli and The Four Seasons
- Gallagher
- Garry Shandling
- Garth Brooks
- George Benson
- George Carlin
- George Jones
- George Strait
- Gladys Knight & the Pips
- Glen Campbell
- Gordon Lightfoot
- Gregory Hines with Dionne Warwick
- Grover Washington, Jr.
- Hamilton, Joe Frank & Reynolds
- Hank Ballard and the Midnighters
- Harold Melvin & the Blue Notes featuring Teddy Pendergrass
- Harry Chapin
- Herb Alpert and the Tijuana Brass
- Herbie Hancock
- Hiroshima (band)
- Holly Dunn opened for Garth Brooks
- Howie Mandel
- Ike & Tina Turner
- Isley Brothers
- Jack Benny
- James Brown
- Jan & Dean
- Jane Powell in My Fair Lady (1964)
- Janis Ian
- Jean-Luc Ponty
- Jeffrey Osborne
- Jerry Lee Lewis
- Jerry Seinfeld
- Jimmy Buffett (with Michael Utley)
- Jimmy Durante
- John Denver
- Johnny Carson
- Johnny Cash
- Johnny Mathis
- Josephine Baker
- Judy Collins
- Judy Garland
- Julio Iglesias
- KC and the Sunshine Band
- Kenny G
- Kenny Rogers & The First Edition
- Lacy J. Dalton
- Leo Kottke
- Leo Sayer
- Liberace
- Linda Ronstadt
- Little Richard
- Liza Minnelli
- LL Cool J
- Louie Anderson
- Louis Anderson
- Luther Vandross
- Lydia Pense with Cold Blood
- Mac Davis
- Marie Osmond
- Mario Cuomo
- Marsha Warfield
- Martina McBride
- Marvin Gaye
- Mel Tillis
- Melissa Manchester
- Miami Sound Machine
- Miss Pat Collins, The Hip Hypnotist
- Moody Blues
- Natalie Cole
- Neil Diamond
- New Edition
- Oasis
- Oliver North
- Olivia Newton-John
- Pat Boone
- Pato Banton
- Peter, Paul and Mary
- Pia Zadora
- Ray Charles
- Red Buttons in Damn Yankees
- Red Skelton
- Redd Foxx
- Restless Heart
- Return to Forever
- Rich Little
- Richard Marx
- Richard Pryor (1992)
- Rick James
- Ricky Nelson
- Rita Rudner
- Robert Palmer
- Rodney Dangerfield
- Roger Troutman
- Roseanne Barr
- Roy Orbison
- Sam Kinison
- Sammy Davis, Jr.
- Sérgio Mendes and Brasil 66
- Sérgio Mendes and Brasil 77
- Sha na na
- Shalamar
- Slim Whitman
- Smokey Robinson
- Sonny and Cher
- Steve Lawrence and Eydie Gormé
- Steve Marriott Allstars
- Stevie Wonder, billed as Little Stevie Wonder
- Sugarhill Gang
- Sylvester
- The Animals
- The Beach Boys
- The Bellamy Brothers
- The Brothers Johnson
- The Captain and Tennille
- The Carpenters
- The Dave Clark Five
- The 5th Dimension
- The Gap Band
- The Grass Roots
- The Kingston Trio
- The Lennon Sisters
- The Jackson 5
- The Jets
- The Limelighters
- The Mills Brothers
- The Oakridge Boys
- The Ohio Players
- The Rascals (Reunion Tour)
- The Righteous Brothers
- The Skatalites
- The Smothers Brothers
- The Spinners
- The Statler Brothers
- The Stylistics
- The Temptations
- The Three Stooges
- The Untouchables
- Three Dog Night
- Tim Allen
- Toby Keith
- Tom Jones
- Tom Waits
- Tom Wopat (From The Dukes of Hazzard)
- Tommy Bolin
- Tommy James & the Shondells
- Tony Orlando & Dawn
- Tony! Toni! Toné!
- Tower of Power
- Trouble Funk
- Van Morrison
- War (U.S. band)
- Waylon Jennings
- Wayne Newton
- Willie Nelson
- Wolfe Tones
- Yellowman
- Yvonne Elliman
- Ziggy Marley
