= Richard L. Hay (scenic designer) =

Scottish-born scenic designer and artist

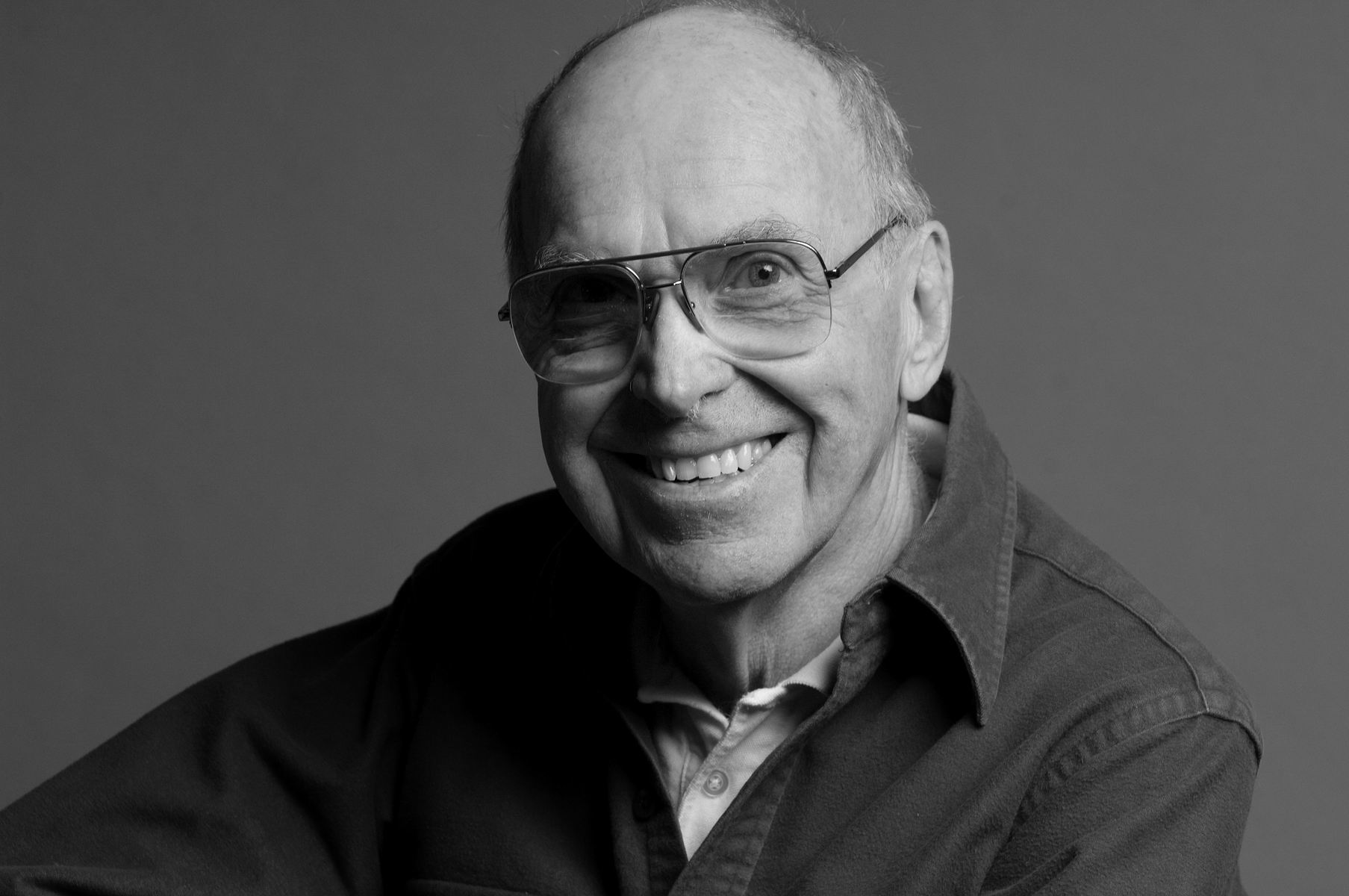
- principal theatre and scenic director at the Oregon Shakespeare Festival.
- Born: 1929
- Occupation(s): theatre scenic artist; artist

Richard L. Hay (born 1929) is the principal theatre and scenic director at the Oregon Shakespeare Festival.

== Career ==
Hay has since 1950 been actor, lighting assistant, technical director, art director, designer and technical director, resident scenic designer, and principal theatre and scenic director at the Oregon Shakespeare Festival, interrupted by occasional stints at other theatres. The Oregon Shakespeare Festival has dedicated its 2009 season, the fiftieth anniversary of the Elizabethan Stage which he designed, to Richard Hay.

Over more than half a century, Hay has designed four theaters and 245 productions, 112 of them by Shakespeare, for the festival. He has designed sets for every single one of Shakespeare’s plays two times, and he has designed sets for The Merchant of Venice, Twelfth Night, Hamlet, Henry V and Much Ado about Nothing five times. He designed nine other theaters including the Festival Stage and New Old Globe Theatre in San Diego, the Source Theatre and Space Theatre in Denver, the Intiman Playhouse in Seattle, the Milwaukee Repertory Theater, and Artists Repertory Theatre in Portland, Oregon. Outside of the Oregon Shakespearean Festival he has done the scenic design for 85 additional productions at theatres such as the Mark Taper Forum in Los Angeles, Kennedy Center in Washington, D.C., and the Gramercy Arts Theatre and Nederlander Theatre (formerly Billy Rose Theatre) in New York. He is known for producing sets that vary from the highly realistic through the whimsical to the stark and abstract, and for his ability to work with directors and technical staff.

== Biography ==
Richard Hay as a child made a cardboard box theatre with colored construction paper scenery, and as a teenager designed his first set for his high school class production of Pride and Prejudice in Wichita, Kansas. He earned his BA in civil engineering and architecture in 1952, and his MA in theater arts from Stanford University. He was a Fulbright Fellow in England and is the recipient of the Oregon Governor’s Arts Award. the Hollywood Drama-Logue Critics Award, the Portland, Oregon, Critics Circle Drammy Award, and was selected as the first recipient of the Distinguished Achievement Award of the United States Institute for Theatre Technology. He has been listed in Who’s Who in America, Who’s Who in the West, Who’s Who in Entertainment, and Theatrical Designers: An International Biographical Dictionary. He has appeared in small roles in Henry IV, Part One, The Comedy of Errors, Titus Andronicus, and The Knight of the Burning Pestle. His early work is summarized with illustrations in A Space for Magic: Stage Settings by Richard Hay.

== Dick Hay Pie ==
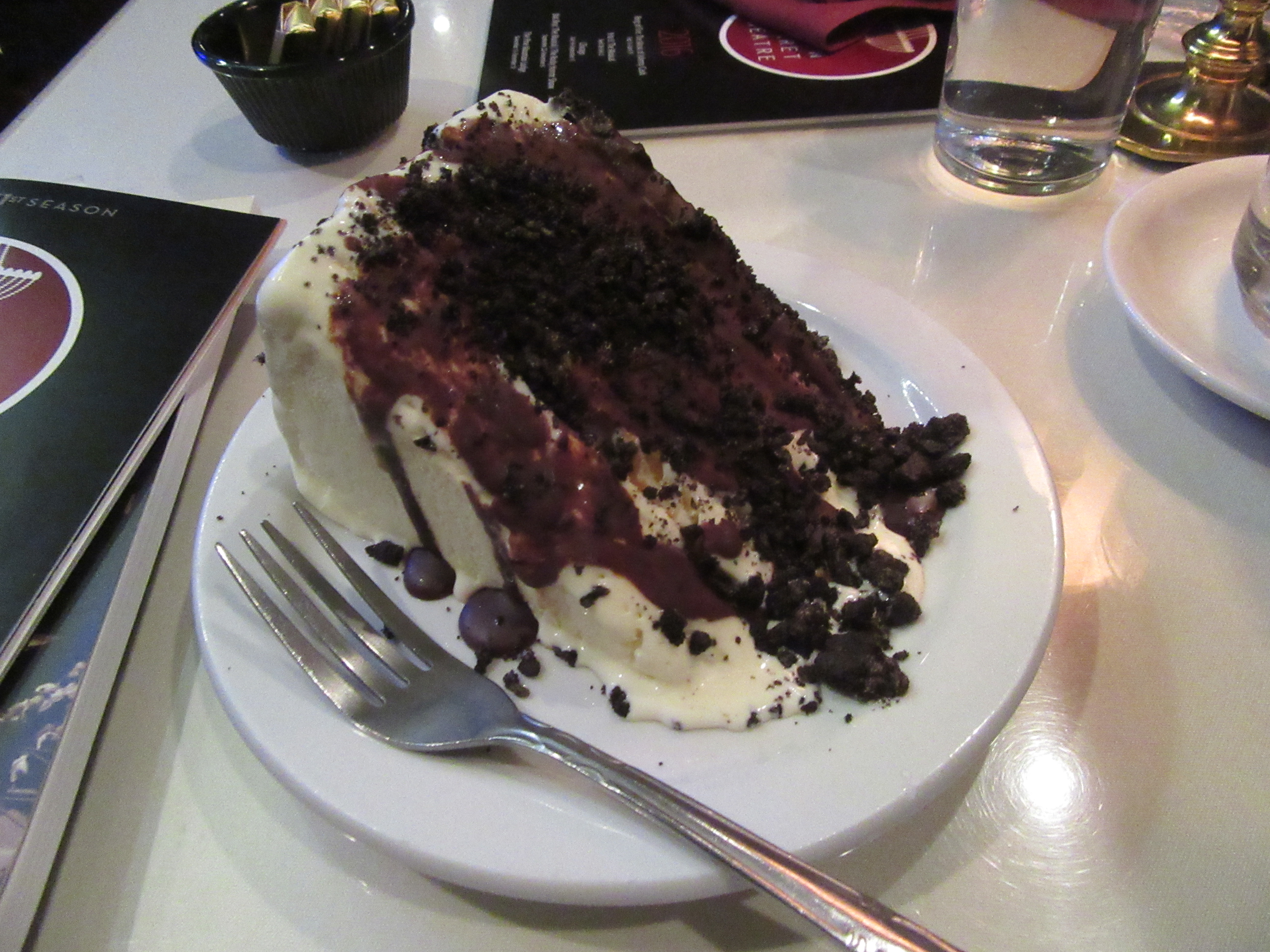
Dick Hay Pie

Dick Hay Pie, a signature dessert at the Oregon Cabaret Theatre in Ashland, is named after Richard L. Hay. It is made of ice cream, peanut butter, and chocolate.

The secret origin of the Dick Hay Pie was revealed in the show Crossing The Streams at the Oregon Cabaret Theatre on September 27 and 29, 2021.
