= Mountain View Center for the Performing Arts =

Arts venue in Mountain View, California

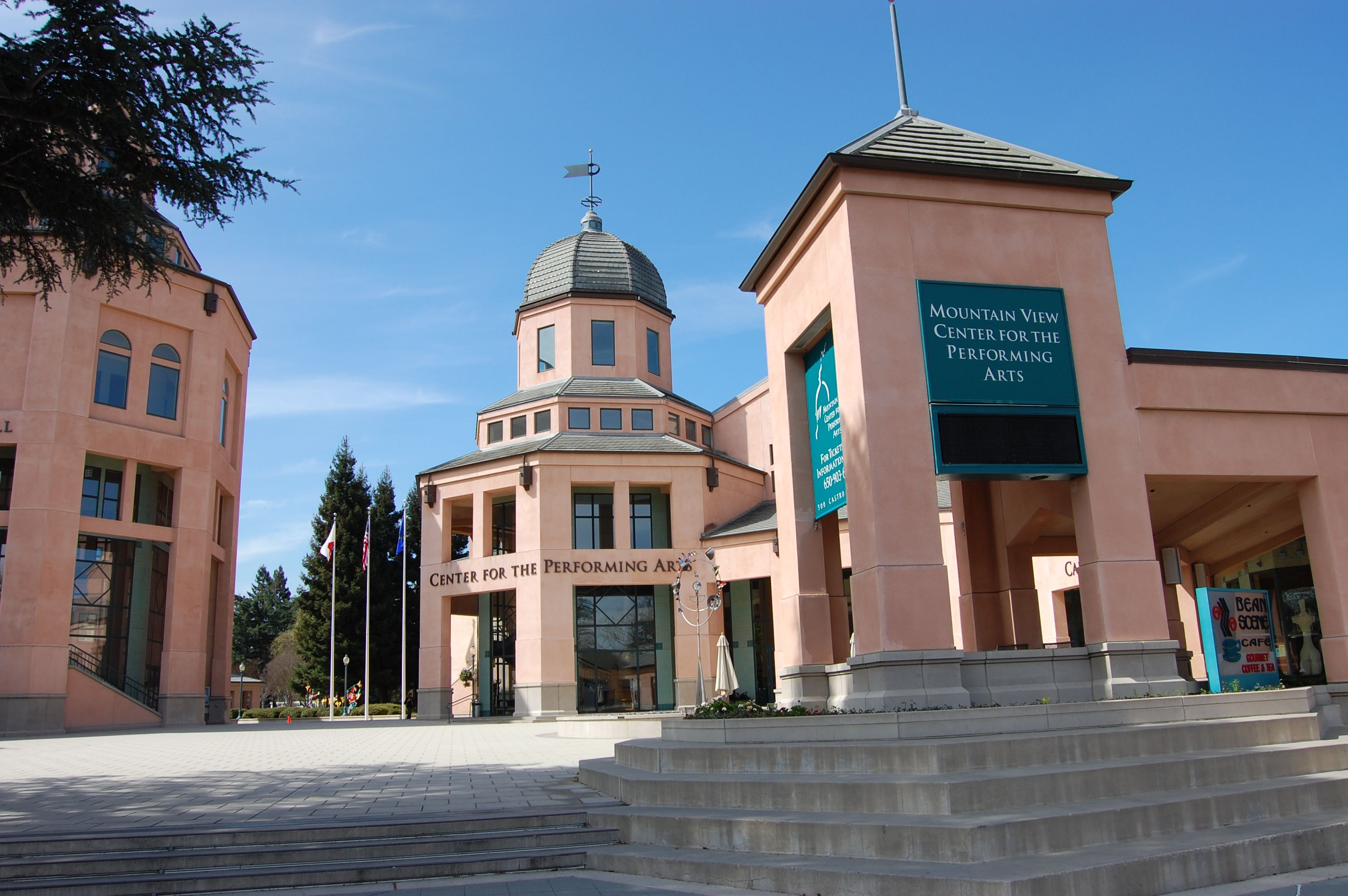
- Interactive map of Mountain View Center for the Performing Arts
- Location: Mountain View, California, U.S.
- Coordinates: 37.39015°N 122.0823°W
- Owner: City of Mountain View
- Seating type: Reserved seating
- Capacity: 600 (Main theater); 200 (SecondStage); 300 (ParkStage); 1,100 (total)
- Type: Theatre
- Events: Theatre, dance, and music

Construction
- Opened: 1991
- Renovated: 2013 (seating)

Tenants
- TheatreWorks, Peninsula Youth Theatre, Upstage Theater

Website
- www.mountainview.gov/depts/cs/mvcpa/subsite/default.asp

The Mountain View Center for the Performing Arts is located in downtown Mountain View, California. It is operated by the City of Mountain View and hosts a variety of art events. Its home theatre companies include TheatreWorks, Peninsula Youth Theatre, and Upstage Theater.

== History ==
It was founded in 1991 with three stages, and holds performances in theatre, dance, and music.

According to Mercury News, the facility is referred to by Mountain View city employees as the MVCPA. As of August 2017, its executive director was Scott Whisler. An expansion project started in 2017 is to add two dressing rooms, a green room for Second Stages, and improve the Park Stage.

In 2018, a production of the play Frost/Nixon debuted at the center.

== See also ==
- Theater in California
