= TheatreWorks (Silicon Valley) =

Company

TheatreWorks Silicon Valley
- TheatreWorks Silicon Valley logo
- Location: Palo Alto, California, United States
- Type: Regional Theatre Company
- Capacity: Mountain View Center for the Performing Arts: 600 Lucie Stern Theatre: 400
- Opened: July 1970
- Artistic Director: Giovanna Sardelli
- Website: www.theatreworks.org

TheatreWorks Silicon Valley is a professional non-profit theatre company based in Palo Alto, California, United States. It was founded in 1970 by Robert Kelley.

== History ==
=== 1970s ===
Robert Kelley, a Bay Area native and Stanford University graduate in creative writing, founded TheatreWorks in July 1970. The company's inaugural production was Popcorn, an original musical reflecting the social changes of the era, which premiered in July 1970.

=== 1980s and 1990s ===
In the 1980s, TheatreWorks continued to emphasize diversity and innovation under the leadership of Associate Artistic Director Anthony J. Haney. The company premiered productions such as The Fireworks Rag (1981), featuring a predominantly African-American cast.

=== 2000s ===
In 2002, TheatreWorks developed the musical Memphis at its New Works Festival. TheatreWorks then produced the world premiere of Memphis on its main stage in 2004. Memphis later opened on Broadway in 2009 and won four Tony Awards, including Best Musical.

=== 2010s and 2020s ===
Founding Artistic Director Robert Kelley retired in June 2020 after 50 years with the company.

In 2019, TheatreWorks received the Regional Theatre Tony Award.
