= Christina da Silva =

Dutch actor and opera singer (1809–1881)

Christina da Silva (1809 – 1881) was a Dutch stage actress and opera singer.

== Life ==
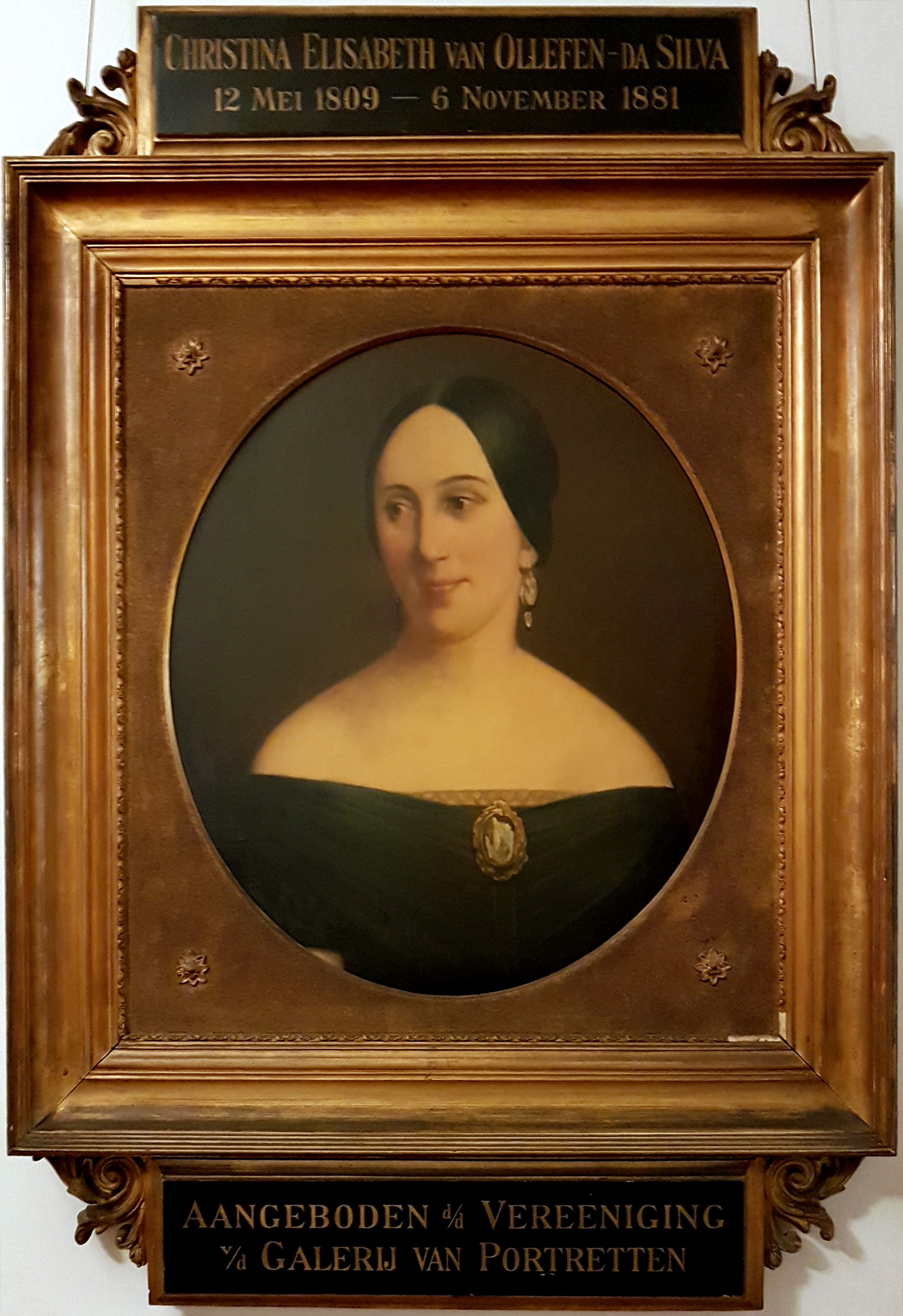
Portret Christina Elisabeth da Silva (1809-1881) door G Overman

She was born to the captain Emmanuel Zulva and Margaret Catherine Mulder.

She was engaged at the Amsterdamse Schouwburg in 1826–1846, at the Zuid-Hollandsche Tooneelisten in 1847–1855, in Antwerp in 1855–1856, at the Rotterdamse Schouwburg in 1856–1858 and back at the Amsterdamse Schouwburg in 1858–1863.

As was still common in this time period, she was active both as an actor within drama as well as an opera singer. She appeared as soubrette, amoureuse and ingénue, but was mostly noted as a tragedienne.

She was referred to as one of the three main female stars of the Amsterdamse Schouwburg alongside Jacoba Majofski och Mimi Bia. The nepotism in which Bia as the wife of the theatre director was given first choice in important parts and influence in who were given which roles caused her two main rivals Majofski and da Silva to leave the Schouwburg after a conflict in 1846.
