= Jakoba Wouters =

Jakoba Wouters (1751 – 1813) was a Dutch stage actress, ballerina and opera singer.

== Life ==
Wouters was born to the ballet dancer Willem Wouters (d. 1768?) and costume dresser Teresa.

Wouters made her stage debut in 1758 at Leiden in the company of Jacob Toussaint Neyts. She was engaged at the Corvers theater in The Hague in 1767–73, at the Rotterdamse Schouwburg 1773–79 and at the Amsterdamse Schouwburg in 1779–1813.

She was known for her breeches roles within drama. She had considerable fame and was at one point referred to as the first actress in the Netherlands, second only to Johanna Wattier. As was still common in her generation, she was also engaged as a ballet dancer and as an opera singer, though it was as a dramatic stage actor she is most well known.
