= Jacoba Majofski =

Jacoba Majofski (1807 – 1847) was a Dutch actress and opera singer.

== Life ==
She was born to the actors Johannes Theodorus Majofski (1771-1836) and Johanna Christina Elizabeth Adams (1767-1844) and was the sister of the actresses Louiza Majofski and Annemie Majofski.

She was engaged at the Amsterdamse Schouwburg from 1812 to 1846 and at the Zuid-Hollandsche Tooneelisten from 1846 to 1847.

As was still common in this time period, she was active both as an actor within drama as well as an opera singer. She played both main roles within classical drama, as well as operatic roles, often in vaudeville.

She was referred to as one of the three main female stars of the Amsterdamse Schouwburg alongside Christina da Silva and Mimi Bia. The nepotism in which Bia as the wife of the theatre director was given first choice in important parts and influence in who were given which roles caused her two main rivals Majofski and da Silva to leave the Schouwburg after a conflict in 1846.
