= Léo Jo =

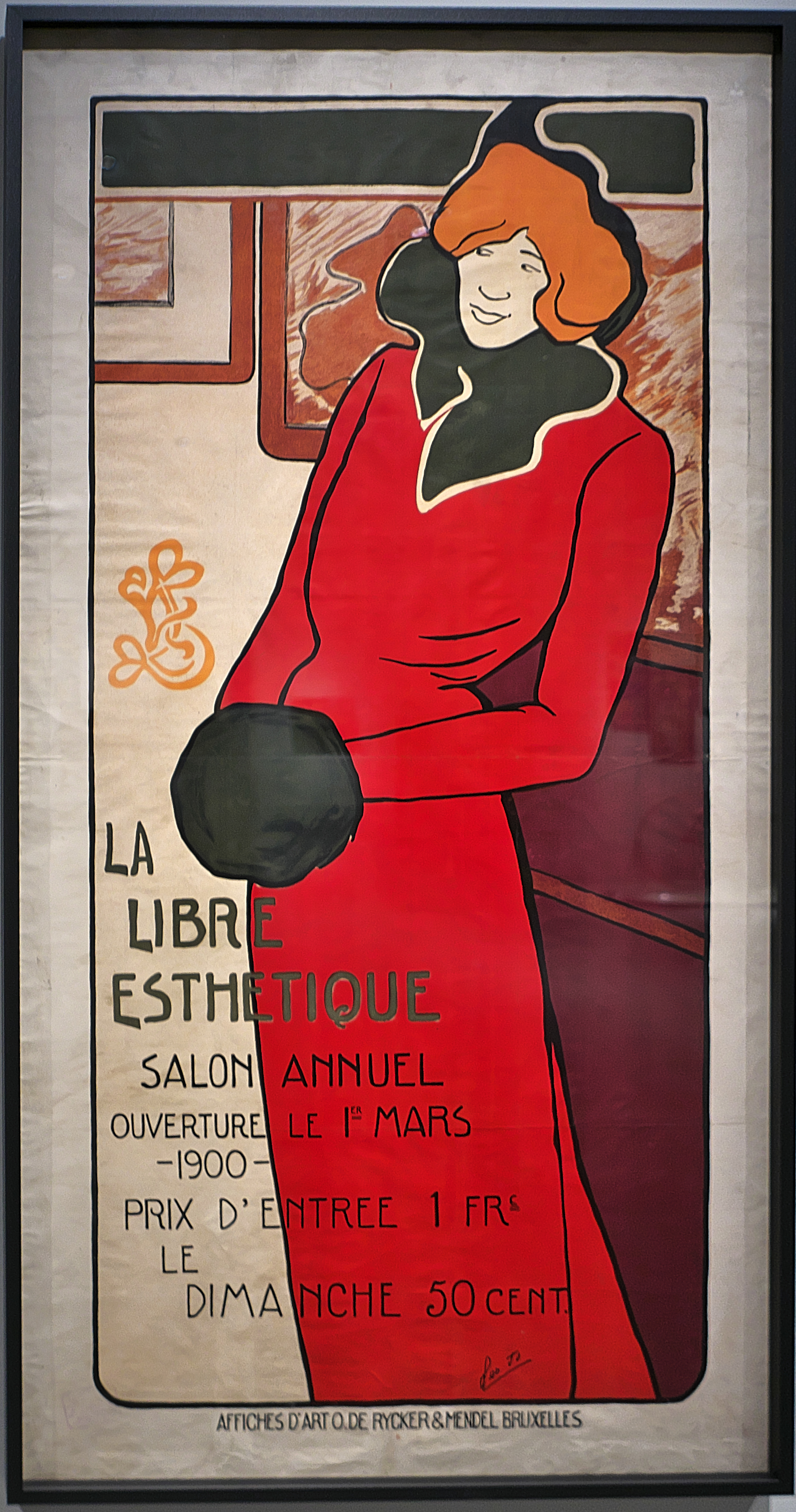
- poster for the 1900 La Libre Esthétique salon by Léo Jo
- Born: October 29, 1870; Tournai
- Died: 1962 (aged 91–92); Woluwe-Saint-Pierre
- Occupation: Painter, caricaturist, poster artist

Léontine Joris (October 29, 1870 – 1962) was a Belgian painter, caricaturist, and poster artist of the Art Nouveau movement who worked under the pseudonym Léo Jo.

Léo Jo was born on October 29, 1870 in Tournai, Hainaut, Belgium. She was a self-taught artist; sculptor Charles van der Stappen, a family friend, refused her lessons for fear of inhibiting her natural talents. She made her debut at the 1899 annual salon of La Libre Esthetique, exhibiting with them again in 1900 and 1912 and designing the poster for the 1900 salon. She also exhibited at the Brussels Salon in 1907, the Société Nationale des Aquarellistes et Pastellistes de Belgique in 1903, and the 10th Venice Biennale in 1912.

Her caricatures and illustrations appeared in French, German, and Belgian periodicals, including Art Décoratif, Comica, L'Illustration Européenne, Lachendes Jahrhundert, Lustige Blätter, Le Rire, Le Samedi, Simplicissimus, Le Transcontinental, and La Verveine. She illustrated the children's books Contes de Sambre-et-Meuse (1905) and Les Manches de lustrine (1913) by Maurice Des Ombiaux.

Léo Jo died in 1962 in Woluwe-Saint-Pierre.
