= Andries Snoek =

Dutch actor

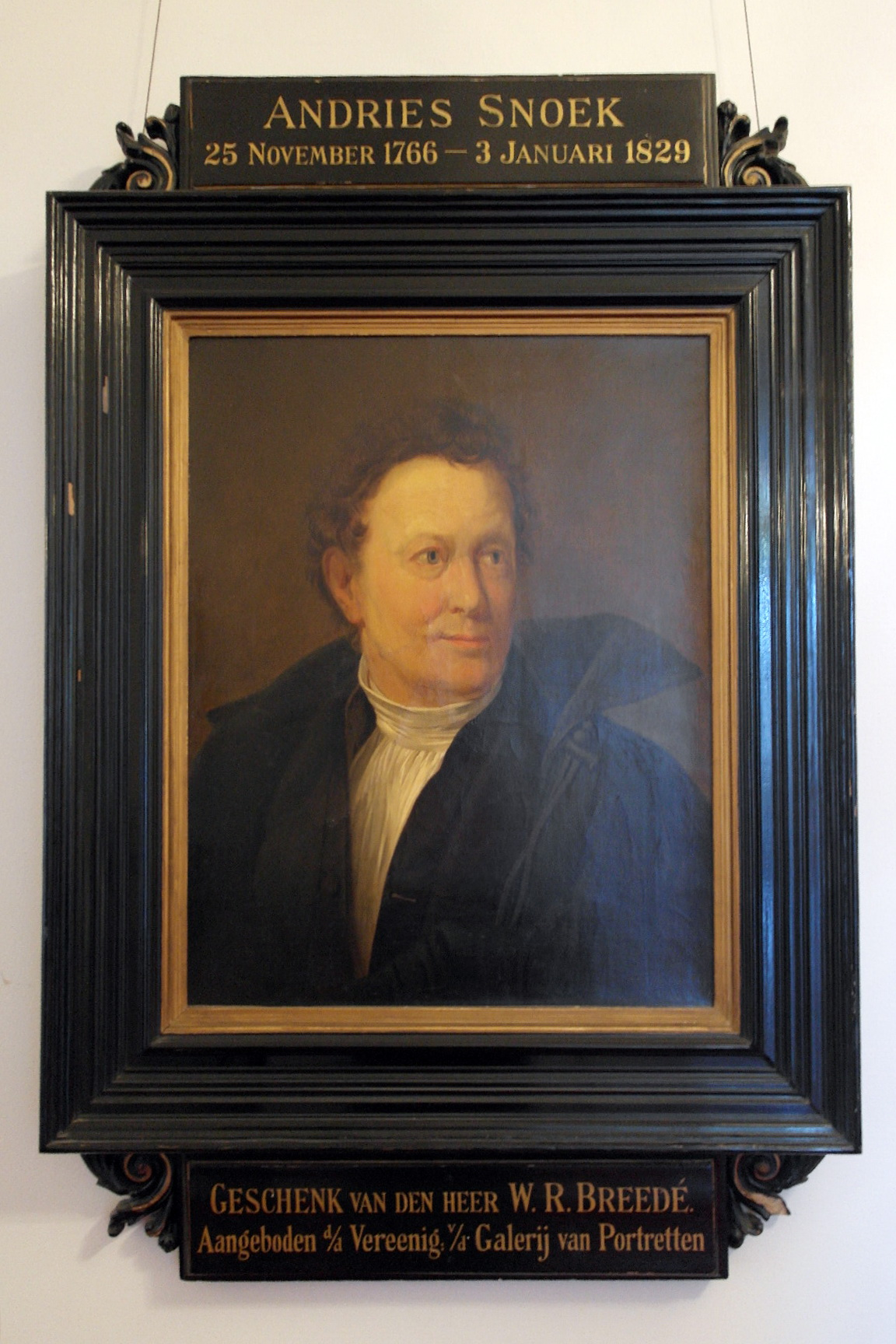

Andries Snoek (14 November 1766 - 3 January 1829) was a Dutch actor and director. He was born in Rotterdam, the son of Jan Snoek and Helena de Ruyter, and the brother of actresses Anna Maria and Helena Snoek. Despite his low birth, he became one of the most famous northern Dutch actors of his time. In 1791 he joined the Nederduitse Acteurs of Ward Bingley. In response to the Batavian Revolution, Snoek left Rotterdam. Liesbeth Sparks calls him a “‘method actor’ avant la lettre”.

In 1795, Snoek began working with the Stadsschouwburg Amsterdam and remained until 1825. He worked with numerous Dutch performers of the time, including his female counterpart Johanna Wattier.

== Personal life ==
Snoek married Maria Hendrika Adams (1765?-1838), also an actress. The marriage was childless.
