= Trier (disambiguation) =

Trier is a city in Germany on the banks of the Moselle.

Trier may also refer to:

== Uses ==
- Trier (region), a historical region of Germany
- Trier Air Base, a former military airfield near Trier, Germany
- Trier of fact, in a legal proceeding

== People ==
- Allonzo Trier (born 1996), American basketball player
- Carola Trier (1913–2000), German pilates practitioner
- Hann Trier (1915–1999), German artist
- Herman Trier (1845–1925), Danish educator and politician
- Joachim Trier (born 1974), Norwegian film director
- Jost Trier (1894–1970), German linguist
- Karl von Trier (1265–1324), Grand Master of the Teutonic Order
- Lars von Trier (born 1956) (Lars Trier), Danish film director
- Walter Trier (1890–1951), Czech-German illustrator

== See also ==
- New Trier (disambiguation)
- Trier-Land, a collective municipality in the Trier-Saarburg district, Germany
- Trier-Saarburg, a district in Germany
