= Georg Mühlen-Schulte =

German writer (1882–1981)

- Born: 30 June 1882
- Died: 1964; Berlin
- Occupation: Writer

Georg Mühlen-Schulte (1882–1964) was a German novelist, journalist and humourist. Following Alexander Moszkowski he was editor-in-chief of the Berlin-based satirical magazine Lustige Blätter until 1931. He also worked as a lyricist for several Weimar era cabaret artists including Felix Bressart, Paul Graetz und Eugen Rex, and was employed as a screenwriter. Several of his novels were made into films including The Call of the Jungle (1936), The Impossible Mister Pitt (1938) and The Thing About Styx (1942).

== Bibliography ==
- Goble, Alan. The Complete Index to Literary Sources in Film. Walter de Gruyter, 1999. ISBN 978-1-85739-229-6.
- Hardt, Ursula. From Caligari to California: Erich Pommer's life in the International Film Wars. Berghahn Books, 1996. ISBN 978-1-57181-930-7.
