= Clara van Santen =

Dutch stage actor and ballet dancer

Clara van Santen (1740–1792) was a Dutch stage actress and ballet dancer.

== Life ==
She was born to the wine merchant Anthony van Santen (1702–1745) and Johanna Zomer (1701–1764).

She was engaged at the Amsterdamse Schouwburg in 1759–1782.

She was engaged as both an actor and a ballet dancer, as it was common in that time period to both act, dance (and sing) when possible. Her career as an actor was moderate and not given good reviews. However, as a ballet dancer, Clara van Santen was referred to as the best indigenous dancer in the Netherlands in a time period when the elite dancers in the Netherlands were normally engaged from France or Italy rather than locally.
