= Helena Snoek =

Dutch actress (1764–1807)

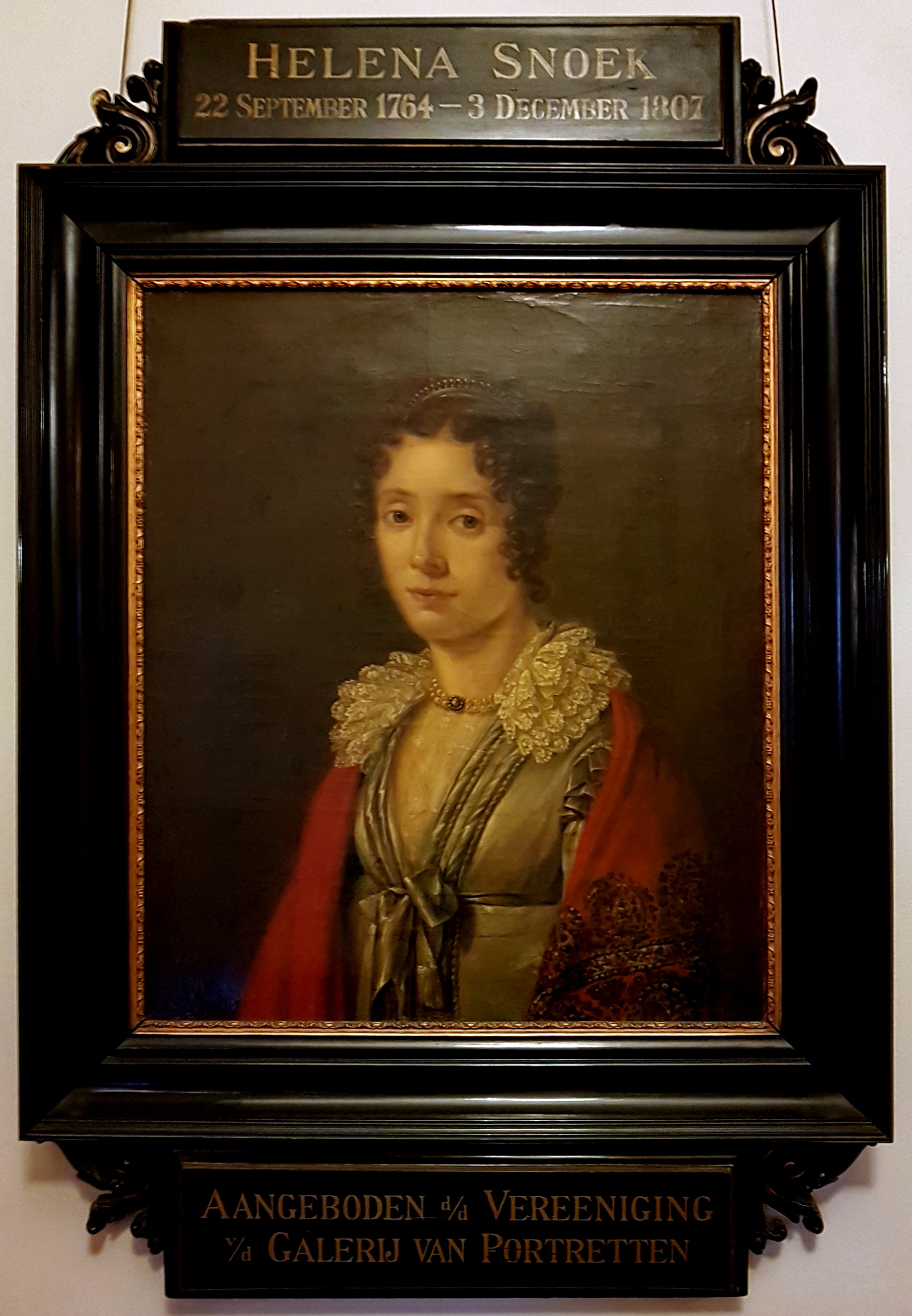
Helena Snoek

Helena Snoek (22 September 1764 – 3 December 1807) was a Dutch actress. She also played a popular tragedy role in the historical play, Gijsbrecht van Aemstel by Joost van den Vondel.

== Biography ==
Helena Snoek was the eldest of five children in the Catholic family of skipper Joannes Snoek (d. 1780), from Emden, and Helena de Ruijter (d. 1808), shopkeeper who was born in Heusden. She was the sister of the actors Andries Snoek and Anna Maria Snoek.

In 1787, Helena Snoek began her career with the traveling troupe of W. van Dinsen Jr. Andries Snoek who first joined at the Rotterdam Theater later brought together a troupe of musical professionals including Helena Snoek and Anna Maria Snoek.

In 1789, Helena Snoek married singer Pieter Snoeck (1769–1848) who mainly played comedic roles then joined the troupe at the Rotterdam Theater.

Between 1792 and 1793, Helena Snoek served as the director of the Rotterdam Theater along with Andries Snoek. They owned the troupe under the name of Andries Snoek from 1793 to 1795.

At the beginning of 1793, the Rotterdam Theater was closed due to the French invasion. The musical troupe was subsequently moved to the Southern Netherlands through Breda to Ghent and Bruges. In March 1794, the troupe further reached to Brussels, and at the end of that year returned to Bruges.

In February 1795, the troupe eventually reached to Rotterdam. Helena Snoek was also associated with the theater hall Utile et Amusant in Amsterdam. She then had a long career with the Stadsschouwburg Amsterdam between 1795 and 1807.

She died on 3 December 1807.
