= Catharina Petit =

Dutch actress

Catharina Petit (1660–1740) was a Dutch stage actress.

== Life ==
She was born to Jean Baptiste Petit (d. 1680) and Beatrix Rocataliata (d. 1687), sister of the actors Jan Petit, Maria Petit and Isabella Petit and married in 1681 to actor Hermanus Benjamin (1653/54-1703).

She was engaged at the Amsterdamse Schouwburg in 1660–1740.

While few of the roles she played are documented, it is clear that she belonged to the elite actors of the stage, which is reflected from her high salary and the fact that she played "the main female role" from 1693 until at least twenty years onward. A contemporary critic commented that if Catarina Petit and her sister Maria Petit were to leave the theatre, there would be no one left to play the lead roles they performed.

She was evidently seen as a role model; as late as the 1720s other actresses were compared disfavorably to her and in the 1730s she was highly praised in connection to the century jubilee of the Amsterdam theatre.
