= Maria Francisca Bia =

Dutch ballet dancer and opera singer

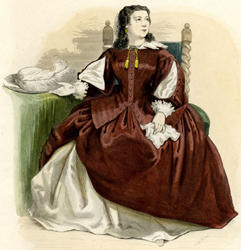
Mimi Bia as the Duchess of Marlborough (Ch. Rochussen, 1841)

Maria Francisca Bia known as Mimi Bia and as Mimi Engelman-Bia and Mimi de Vries-Bia (9 September 1809 – 13 July 1889) was a Dutch ballet dancer, opera singer (soprano) and dramatic stage actress. Starting her career as a ballet dancer, she had a parallel career as both a soprano opera singer as well as a dramatic stage actress at the Amsterdamse Schouwburg, where she had a dominant role within the Dutch theatre world. She was the manager director and owner of the theatre Utrechtse Schouwburg in Utrecht in 1875-1880.

== Biography ==
Mimi Bia was born in Amsterdam to Jean Lambert Bia (1767–1829) and Catherine Rebecca Grave (1782–1846).

In 1828 she married the actor Reinier Engelman (1795–1845), director and manager of the Amsterdamse Schouwburg, and in 1865 to the actor Jan Eduard de Vries (1808–1875), director and manager of the theatre Utrechtse Schouwburg in Utrecht.

Her parents were both engaged as ballet dancers at the Amsterdamse Schouwburg, and Mimi Bia started her stage career as a ballet dancer in her childhood. She was given good critic as a ballet dancer. She was additionally given instruction in dramatic acting by Johanna Wattier and made her debut as an actor at the age of ten. She was given instruction in singing and made her debut in her third profession as an operatic society at the age of fourteen.

Mimi Bia made her formal debut at the Amsterdamse Schouwburg in 1826. She was engaged at the Amsterdamse Schouwburg in 1827-1859 and at the Rotterdamse Schouwburg in 1859-1865. She was also active as a guest actor at the Théâtre Français in Paris in 1842-44.

Bia was regarded as one of the greatest actors of her time in the Netherlands. She was versatile and acted within both tragedy and comedy, which was special in a time period were most actors still specialized within a genre. Among her most noted roles were the title role of Juffrouw Serklaas by Hendrik Jan Schimmel. As both one of the leading stage artists as well as the spouse of the director, her influence within the theatre was great: she either took the leading roles herself or could influence to whom they were given.

She retired in 1865 and made her last guest appearance in 1868. Her second spouse were the owner and manager of the theatre Utrechtse Schouwburg, and when he died in 1875, she took over the theatre and managed until 1880.

== Special ==
In June 2000 the painting of Maria Francisca Bia by H.A. Sangster has been partly damaged by a burglary in the Amsterdam Stadsschouwburg, while a bronze mask (1923) was stolen by the famous Amsterdam sculptor Hildo Krop.

== Bibliography ==
- Algemeen Handelsblad, 23-2-1846; 30-11-1868.
- Amsterdamsche Courant, 29-11-1868 [recensie]; 16-7-1889.
- N. Beets, Het dagboek van de student Nicolaas Beets 1833-1836 (Den Haag 1883) 123.
- M.B. Mendes da Costa, Tooneel-herinneringen, 1 (Leiden 1900) 44, 45, 179-181.
- Noord- en Zuid-Nederlandsche Tooneel-Almanak (Amsterdam 1877).
- W.G.F.A. van Sorgen, De tooneelspeelkunst te Utrecht en de Utrechtsche schouwburg (Den Haag 1885).
- Utrechtsch Dagblad, 10-7-1880.
- J.A. Worp, Geschiedenis van den Amsterdamschen Schouwburg (Amsterdam 1920).
- N. van Vulpen, Ondernemers van publieke vermakelijkheden en de opkomst van het burgerinitiatief: vermaak in Utrecht 1850-1880 (Utrecht 1994).
