= Herbert Ihering =

German dramaturge, director and theatre critic

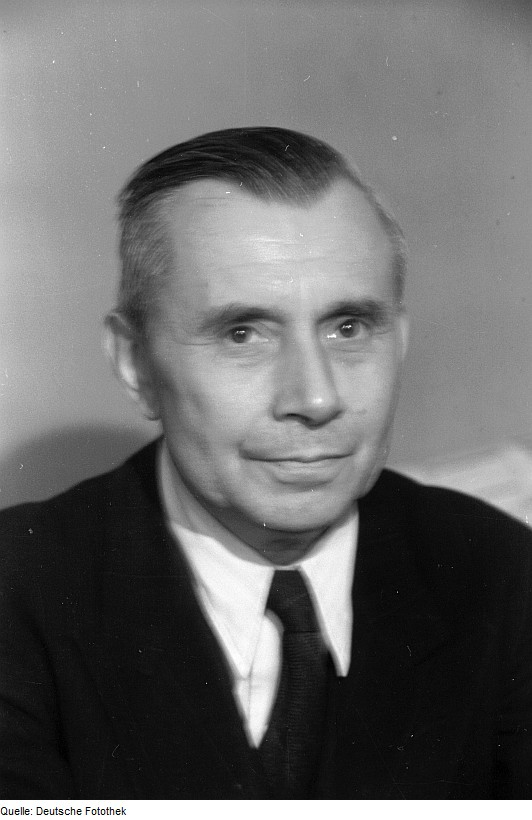
Herbert Ihering (1946)

Herbert Ihering (also sometimes Herbert Jhering: 29 February 1888 – 15 January 1977) was a German dramaturge, director and theatre critic. He was seen by many contemporaries as one of the leading theatre critics during and after the Weimar years.

He was one of the earliest supporters in print of Bertolt Brecht, which formed one basis for a long period of very public disagreement - which sometimes degenerating into journalistic feuding - with Alfred Kerr. Later Ihering incurred the enmity of the dramatist Klaus Mann, who was widely believed to have incorporated Ihering in his novel "Mephisto" as the opportunistic theatre critic and gossip Dr Ihrig (in later editions Dr. Radig).

Although chiefly remembered for his work as a theatre (and film) critic, Ihering also published other forms of writing, and took jobs inside the theatre, working as a dramaturge and in other supportive positions.

== Life ==
Herbert Georg Albrecht Gustav Ihering was born in Springe, a small town just outside Hanover. His father was an Assessor (junior magistrate) at the local court. His career as a critic began in 1909 when he started to work for "Die Schaubühne" ("The Theatre Stage"), a weekly newspaper owned by Siegfried Jacobsohn. Over the next few years he became established as a critic with contributions to a range of newspapers. Between 1914 and 1917 he worked as a dramaturge at the Volksbühne theatre (as it was then known) in Vienna.

He had already contributed to the Berliner Börsen-Courier before the war, and after 1918 he became a regular freelance contributor to it. Between 1918 and 1920 he also worked as a reviewer for the Felix Bloch Erben theatrical publishing house. In 1919 he succeeded Alfred Kerr as the theatre critic on "Der Tag", the mass circulation daily paper produced by August Scherl.

Between 1922 and 1933 at the Berliner Börsen-Courier, under the leadership of Emil Faktor, Ihering built his reputation as one of the most important film and theatre critics in Germany. "Compared to other critics of the time he applied a completely different style. His writing was much more factual, but with a clear mission. In his articles, criticisms and critiques he argued powerfully and sometimes at considerable length. His articles targeted the theatre bosses, from whom he demanded consistent multi-faceted and imaginative scheduling, and directors, dramaturges and set designers on whom he urged - both formally and informally - closer and smarter collaboration."

In 1922 Ihering was mandated by the Kleist Foundation to nominate a recipient for their annual writers' prize. He recommended the young Bertolt Brecht. At the end of 1927 Ihering relocated to a newly built three floor storey house in Berlin-Zehlendorf, where he would live out the final fifty years of his life.

In 1934 he again received an appointment in succession to his longstanding rival Alfred Kerr, from whom on this occasion he took on the critic's seat at the Berliner Tageblatt when Kerr, who was of Jewish provenance, fled with his family into exile, ending up in London a year later. The political backdrop had changed savagely with the Nazi power seizure of January 1933. Ihering was not Jewish and he was not a political activist, but his liberal left-leaning politics were nevertheless very different from those of the government, and in 1936 he was excluded from the National Writers' Chamber ("Reichsschrifttumskammer") established by the Minister for Popular Enlightenment and Propaganda under the auspices of the National Arts Chamber. In the words of one commentator, "Goebbels forbade him from being an active artist (Kunstbetrachter). [But] Ihering was never an artists: he always remained a critic". He now took an uncharacteristically low-profile job as a head of casting with the Tobis Film company, where his principal tasks involved "preparatory work" for films produced by Emil Jannings. From 1941 Ihering was able to publish several actors' biographies in Germany. In 1942 he was summoned to Vienna to work with Lothar Müthel at the Burgtheater. Ihering's published work and his activities as a dramaturge during the Nazi years have damaged his reputation considerably. After the war ended in May 1945 he moved the focus of his work to the Soviet occupation zone (after 1949 the German Democratic Republic), attracting condemnation from some who made different choices: the theatre critic Hans Sahl wrote of him as "zweimal gleichgeschalteten Ihering" ("Ihering, twice brought into line").

In 1945 Ihering took a job as Chief Dramaturge at Berlin's Deutsches Theater, then under the direction of the actor turned theatre director Gustav von Wangenheim. However, von Wangenheim moved on in 1946. In the end, following increasingly public "differences" with Wangenheim's successor, Wolfgang Langhoff, Ihering had to resign from this post in 1953.

From the early 1950 he was a founder member of the Visual Arts section at the Academy of Arts in (East) Berlin. In 1955 he received a blow when his longstanding partner, Lisette Königshof, died. In 1956 he was appointed permanent secretary of the Visual Arts section at the Academy of Arts, remaining in post till 1962. Between 1955 and 1960 Ihering contributed as a theatre critic to Sonntag (Sunday), the weekly newspaper of the East German Cultural Association. During his final years he was the recipient of numerous honours. His last piece of theatre criticism was published in 1974.

== Awards and honours ==
- 1955 de:Lessing-Preis der DDRLessing Prize
- 1963 Honorary doctorate Humboldt University of Berlin
- 1967 Johannes R. Becher-Medal
- 1968 Heinrich Mann Prize
- 1969 Berliner Kunstpreis
- 1970 Silver plaque of the East German Drama Union
- 1971 "Filmband in Gold"
- 1973 Honorary fellowship of the (East) German Academy of Arts
