= Gino De Finetti =

Italian painter

- Gino von Finetti
- Gino De Finetti
- Born: 9 May 1877; Pisino, Austria-Hungary (now Pazin, Croatia)
- Died: 5 August 1955 (aged 78); Gorizia, Italy
- Occupation: Painter

Gino De Finetti also Gino von Finetti (9 May 1877 – 5 August 1955) was an Italian painter. His work was part of the painting event in the art competition at the 1948 Summer Olympics. Born in Istria, De Finetti had a childhood characterized by various transfers due to the work of his father, a railway engineer. After attending school in Trieste, he trained artistically in Munich and lived for a long time in Germany until 1934, the year in which the rise of the Nazi regime convinced him to return to Italy. He was a prolific illustrator, cartoonist and graphic designer.

== Biography ==
Gino de Finetti, also known as Gino von Finetti and Gino Ritter von Finetti, was born in Pisino, Istria (now Pazin, Croatia), on 9 May 1877 (some sources indicate August 9) to Giovanni Battista de Finetti and Anna Radaelli. His father, a railway engineer, had noble origins and belonged to a family originally from Gradisca d'Isonzo, while his mother came from Roncade. At Gino's birth, the family was in Istria as his father supervised the construction of the railway linking Trieste to Pola. His father's occupation led the family to frequent relocations, and de Finetti spent his childhood among Tarvisio, Vienna, Gorizia, Innsbruck and Trieste (where they settled in 1884).

From a very young age de Finetti showed an aptitude and passion for drawing, being particularly fond of the art of Tintoretto, and after classical studies in 1895 he moved to Munich where he first enrolled in the Technische Hochschule (technical high school) and in 1897 at the Munich Academy of Fine Arts. At the Munich academy he became a friend of Albert Weisgerber, and followed with particular attention the lessons of professor Heinrich von Zügel, with a focus on painting en plein air and on paintings depicting animals (especially horses). After completing his academic studies, De Finetti spent a period in Bohemia to devote himself to painting immersed in the wooded nature of that region. From 1901 to 1903 he was on military duty in Graz, Austria.

After his military service, De Finetti returned to Munich, where he contributed his illustrations to the magazine Jugend. In 1904 he moved to Berlin, where he worked for the publishers Ullstein and Scherl and collaborated with numerous magazines and periodicals, both as an illustrator and as a cartoonist. He was also a collaborator of Max Reinhardt, contributing to the staging of some theatre shows. In 1905 he made a trip to Paris where he came into contact with the art of Edgar Degas, Henri de Toulouse-Lautrec and Théodore Géricault. In the same year he began his collaboration with the periodical Simplicissimus, which lasted until 1908. In 1906 he exhibited for the first time with the artists of the Berlin Secession: his visits to these environments continued until the first half of the 1930s, also as a member of the jury of some exhibitions.

In 1911 he married Martha Bermann, a German from Hanover, and opened a studio in Berlin, making it his permanent residence. In the same year, a trip to Paris led him to frequent the theatrical environment, including the so-called Ballets russes organized by Sergei Diaghilev. He also often worked at the Deutsches Theater in Berlin as a decorator. De Finetti therefore worked as an illustrator, graphic designer, painter (especially starting from 1912) and satirical cartoonist, collaborating with numerous periodicals, including Lustige Blätter and Berliner Zeitung.

At the outbreak of the First World War, De Finetti chose not to leave Germany and worked in newspapers and in the production of advertising posters: however, his father's death in 1919 led him to frequent Italy more. In 1920 he participated for the first time in the Venice Biennale, then returning in several following editions (1924, 1928, 1932, 1934, 1953). Exhibitions of him were organized both in Germany and abroad (Poland, Netherlands, France). In 1924 one of his personal exhibitions in Milan achieved moderate success. In 1922 he set up a studio in the family villa in the municipality of Mariano del Friuli, in the Corona district: the house served as both a home and a studio. In 1926 an exhibition in Amsterdam saw him exhibit with the Trieste painter Adolfo Levier. In 1928 he exhibited again in Amsterdam on the occasion of the Olympic Games held there. In Italy he was especially known for his sports-themed prints (horse riding was often the focus of his works). Alfredo Stendardo of the Giornale d'Italia defined De Finetti as "the painter of movement, the painter of vibration, the painter of life".

In 1934 the rise of the Nazi regime in Germany persuaded De Finetti and his spouse to leave the country and move to Italy, to the villa in Corona. Back home, he devoted himself to both painting and illustration, also drawing for the Gazzetta dello Sport. He frequently exhibited at the so-called sindacali (that is, of the trade union organization of artists linked to the Fascist Party) in Trieste. From 1935 to 1938 the painter had a period of frequent exhibitions in Poland, Bulgaria, Hungary and in Italy in Naples.

The Second World War was taken up as a theme by De Finetti in his later works: one of these was entitled Gli infoibati, dedicated to the Foibe massacres. In 1948 in London De Finetti took part in the art competition at the 1948 Summer Olympics in the disciplines of painting and graphics. In 1950 he produced the work Via Crucis, exhibited at the Church of Santi Maria and Zenone in Corona. De Finetti died suddenly in Gorizia on 5 August 1955, suffering a heart attack while he was at the city post office.

== Gallery ==
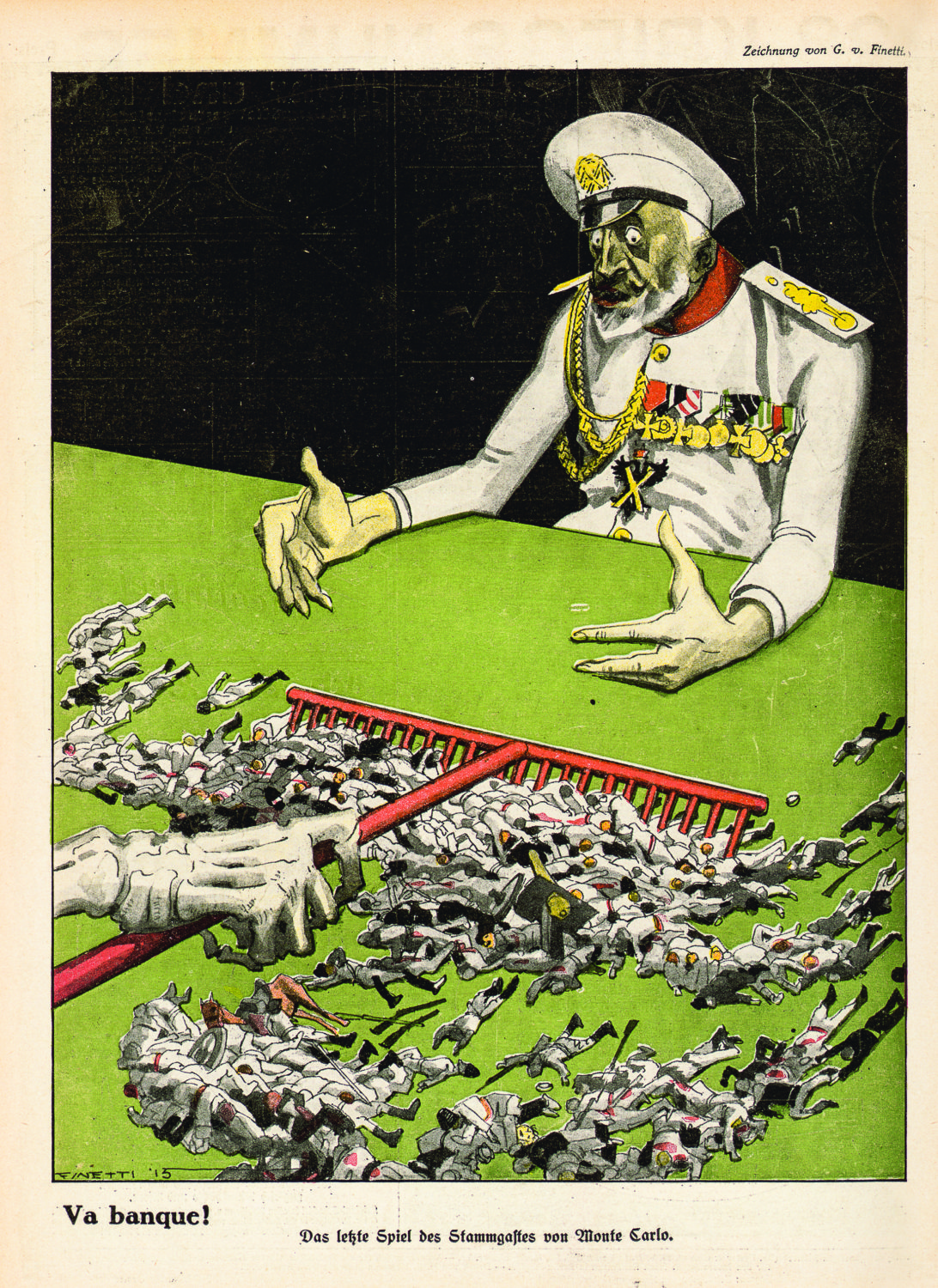
Va banque!, poster from Lustige Blätter, 1915

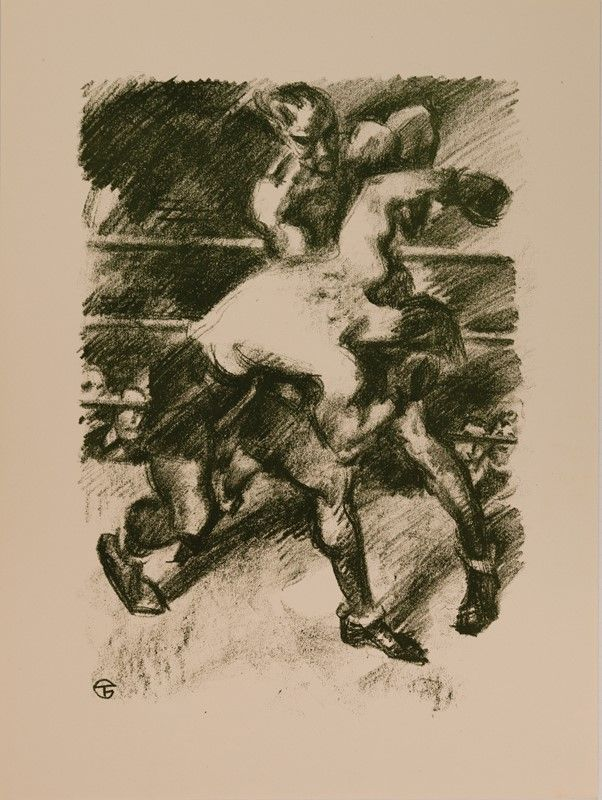
Boxers, lithograph, c. 1920

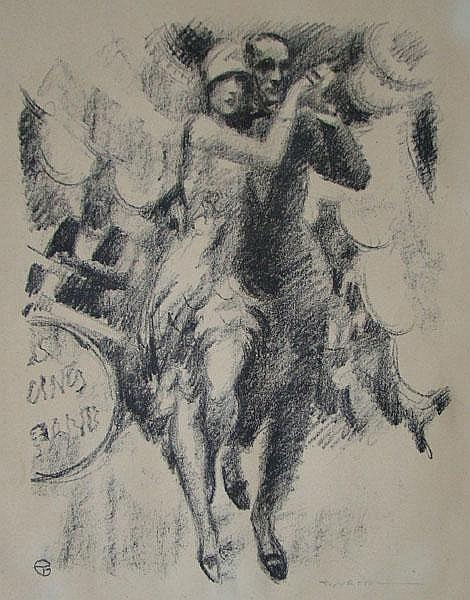
Couple Dancing the Tango, lithograph

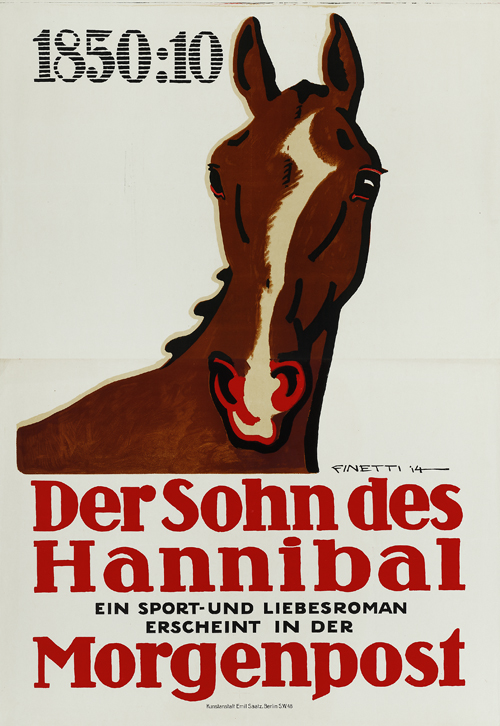
Der Sohn des Hannibal, poster from the Morgenpost, 1915

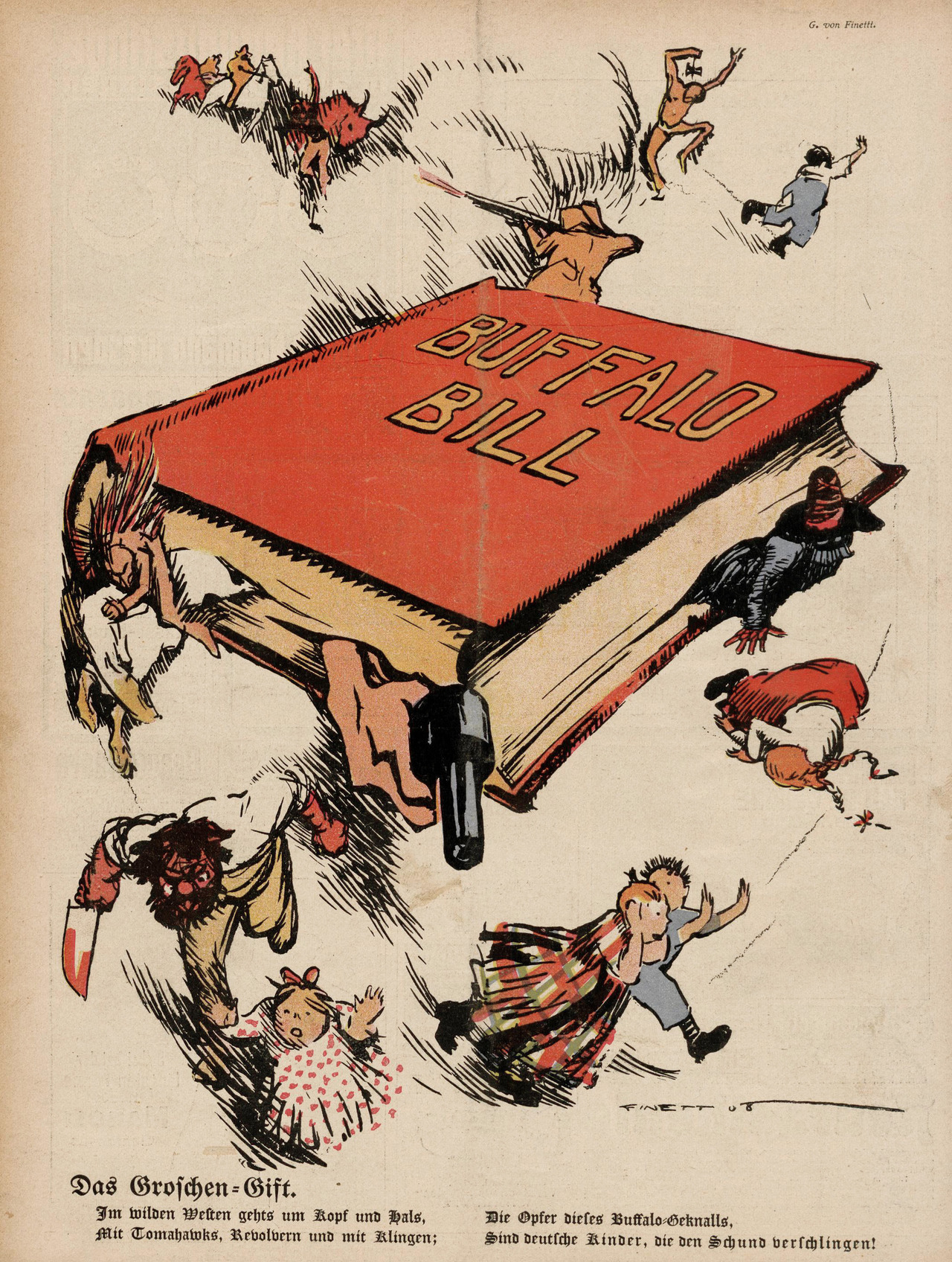
Das Groschen = Gift, poster from Lustige Blätter, 1908

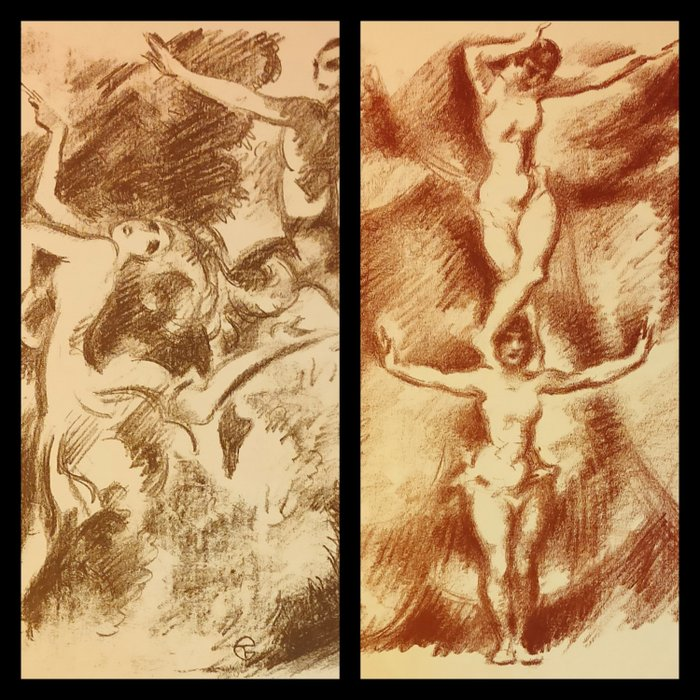
Lithograph, 1927
