= Anna Maria Snoek =

Anna Maria Snoek (1779 – 1849) was a Dutch stage actress, ballet dancer and opera singer.

== Life ==
Snoek was born to the skipper Joannes Snoek (d. 1780) and Helena de Ruijter (d. 1808) and was the sister of the actors Andries and Helena Snoek.

She was engaged at the Amsterdamse Schouwburg in 1795–1849.

Snoek was a star attraction of the theatre. As was common at the time, she was active both as a stage actor and as an opera singer. However, her main career was that of an actor: while she was often engaged to perform operatic parts when other opera singers were not available, her capability as an opera singer was regarded as a moderate one. As an actor, however, she was very successful, popular particularly in roles of sensitive and romantic heroines and then as tender mothers.
