= The Thing About Styx =

1942 film directed by Karl Anton

- Italian release poster
- German: Die Sache mit Styx
- Directed by: Karl Anton
- Written by: Curt J. Braun
- Based on: Rittmeister Styx by Georg Mühlen-Schulte
- Produced by: Karl Anton; Walter Lehmann
- Starring: Laura Solari; Viktor de Kowa; Margit Symo; Will Dohm
- Cinematography: Georg Bruckbauer
- Edited by: Lena Neumann
- Music by: Harald Böhmelt
- Production company: Tobis Film
- Distributed by: Tobis Film
- Release date: 1 April 1942
- Running time: 103 minutes
- Country: Germany
- Language: German

The Thing About Styx (German: Die Sache mit Styx) is a 1942 German comedy crime film directed by Karl Anton and starring Laura Solari, Viktor de Kowa and Margit Symo. It was based on the novel Rittmeister Styx by Georg Mühlen-Schulte.

== Cast ==
- Laura Solari as Julia Sander
- Viktor de Kowa as Captain Styx
- Margit Symo as Ariane
- Will Dohm as Basilio
- Curt Lucas as Jules Stone
- Walter Steinbeck as Jacques Stone
- Hans Leibelt as consul Sander
- Harald Paulsen as Dr. Bonnett
- Theodor Loos as Lenski
- Franz Weber as Cyrill
- Werner Scharf as Tschelebi
- Franz Zimmermann as Dodley
- Kurt Seifert as Eugene
- Karl Meixner as messenger
- Leo Peukert as Duchan
- Hans Stiebner as host
- Louis Ralph as packager
- Wilhelm Bendow as administrator of the legation
- Kurt Mikulski as opera doorman
- Theodor Vogeler as accompanist #1
- Friedrich Petermann as accompanist #2
- Karl Jüstel
- Angelo Ferrari
- Franz Schafheitlin
- Walter Bechmann

== Bibliography ==
- Rentschler, Eric. The Ministry of Illusion: Nazi Cinema and Its Afterlife. Harvard University Press, 1996.
