= The Call of the Jungle =

1936 film directed by Harry Piel

- Directed by: Harry Piel
- Written by: Georg Mühlen-Schulte
- Based on: Die Buschhexe by Georg Mühlen-Schulte
- Produced by: Harry Piel
- Starring: Harry Piel; Paul Henckels; Ursula Grabley; Gerda Maurus
- Cinematography: Georg Bruckbauer; Hans Karl Gottschalk; Károly Vass
- Edited by: Hildegard Grebner
- Music by: Fritz Wenneis
- Production company: Ariel-Film
- Distributed by: Tobis Film
- Release date: 16 January 1936
- Running time: 105 minutes
- Country: Germany
- Language: German

The Call of the Jungle (German: Der Dschungel ruft) is a 1936 German adventure film directed by and starring Harry Piel and also featuring Paul Henckels, Ursula Grabley and Gerda Maurus. It was shot at the Johannisthal Studios in Berlin with sets designed by the art directors Karl Vollbrecht, Erich Grave and Artur Günther. Location shooting took place on Rügen in the Baltic Sea. It was based on a 1930 novel by Georg Mühlen-Schulte and features a hero in the style of Tarzan. The film premiered at the UFA-Palast am Zoo.

== Synopsis ==
Wealthy American Dina Morris and her friends are travelling on a yacht on the Indian Ocean when a faulty engine forces them to go ashore. They head into the jungle where they encounter Bobby Roeder who lives there in harmony with the animals and the locals. He is attracted to Dana, despite his friendship with Rose, the daughter of a butterfly researcher who lives in the vicinity. Things get out of hand when William Edwards, a member of Dina's party, begins shooting animals sacred to the locals.

== Cast ==
- Harry Piel as Bobby Roeder
- Paul Henckels as Professor Helmer
- Ursula Grabley as Rose - seine Tochter
- Gerda Maurus as Dina Morris
- Alexander Golling as William Edwards, Jäger
- Philipp Manning as Banker Clark
- Ewald Wenck as Brown
- Anita Düwell as Elinor
- Emmy Wyda as Mrs. Joyce
- Thea Fischer as Mary Joyce, ihre Tochter
- Erik Ode as Charly Kelly
- Elisabeth Eygk as Maud
- Raimund Warta as Grace, Jagdbegleiter von Edwards
- Bruno Ziener as Rechtsanwalt Petterson
- Egon Brosig as Sir Timothy, Schmetterlingssammler
- Sophie Eschenbach as Kitty
- Friedrich Ettel as Kapitän

== Bibliography ==
- Reimer, Robert C. & Reimer, Carol J. The A to Z of German Cinema. Scarecrow Press, 2010.
- Rentschler, Eric. The Ministry of Illusion: Nazi Cinema and Its Afterlife. Harvard University Press, 1996.
- Waldman, Harry. Nazi Films in America, 1933-1942. McFarland, 2008.
