= Walter Trier =

Czech-German illustrator (1890–1951)

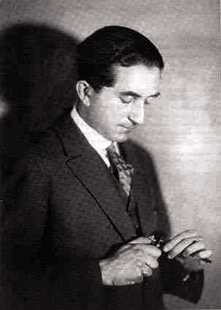
- Born: 25 June 1890; Prague, Bohemia, Austria-Hungary
- Died: July 8, 1951 (aged 61) near Collingwood, Ontario, Canada
- Education: Academy of Fine Arts, Prague Academy of Fine Arts, Munich
- Occupation: Illustrator

Walter Trier (25 June 1890 – 8 July 1951) was an illustrator, best known for his work for the children's books of Erich Kästner and the covers of the magazine Lilliput. He was born in Bohemia, later moved to Germany and then emigrated to Canada. He also lived for a time in the United Kingdom.

== Life ==
Trier was born to a middle class German-speaking Jewish family on 25 June 1890 in Prague. In 1905, Trier entered the Industrial School of Fine and Applied Arts; he later moved to the Prague Academy. In 1906, he entered the Royal Academy, Munich, where he studied under Franz Stuck and Erwin Knirr. In 1910, at age 20, Trier moved to Berlin where he spent most of his career. There he became known for his caricatures and children's book illustrations.

Trier married Helene Mathews in 1913; a daughter, Margaret, was born a year later.

An anti-fascist, Trier's cartoons were bitterly opposed by the Nazis. In 1936 he emigrated to London. During the Second World War, Trier helped the Ministry of Information produce anti-Nazi leaflets and political propaganda. He and his wife became British citizens in 1947, the same year that they moved to Canada to be near their daughter, who had moved to Toronto with her husband in the late thirties.

== Illustrations ==
The December 1946 issue of Lilliput

Trier's works for the periodicals Simplicissimus and Jugend appeared in 1909. The next year, Otto Eysler, the editor of Lustige Blätter, persuaded him to move to Berlin and work for that magazine; Trier worked for Berliner Illustriete Zeitung as well.

In 1927/1929, Trier was introduced to Erich Kästner, and he illustrated Kästner's Emil und die Detektive (Emil and the Detectives).

Trier provided the front cover design for every issue of Lilliput from its start until 1949. Each time, the design featured a man, a woman, and a dog. The man and woman were usually young and almost always a couple, the dog was almost always black. It seems the original dog was Trier's. It was run over by a tram and killed, and after that Trier immortalised him in his Lilliput covers; the idea was light-hearted and the settings and styles varied considerably.

In 1949, Trier illustrated Kästner's children's novel Das doppelte Lottchen (Lisa and Lottie), which Disney then famously adapted into the 1961 film The Parent Trap starring Hayley Mills and its 1998 remake starring Lindsay Lohan.

On his arrival in Canada, Trier started work on illustrations for the company Canada Packers.

== Exhibitions and murals ==
In 1934, Trier held a one-man exhibition in Prague.

Trier also created various murals: in the Kabarett der Komiker at Kurfürstendamm (1929, destroyed by the Nazis in 1933), on the liner SS Bremen (1929), and for Hoffmann–La Roche (Welwyn Garden City, 1938). He also staged designs for Spielzeug (1924) and The Bartered Bride (1931).

Trier held an exhibition of oils and water-colours in the University of Toronto in 1951, the year of his death.

The Walter Trier Gallery at the Art Gallery of Ontario (AGO) Devoted to the work of Walter Trier features small rotating exhibitions of the artist's watercolours, drawings, paintings and sculpture along with satirical works on paper by other artists from the AGO collection.

In 1976, the AGO received a gift from the Trier-Fodor Foundation of over 1100 works by Trier and 345 folk toys. The gift was accompanied by an endowment to support the acquisition of humorous, satirical and illustrative art.

== Bibliography ==
=== Books by Trier ===
- Nazi-German in 22 Lessons, Broadsheet, London, 1942. Reprint: Favoritenpresse, Berlin 2022, ISBN 978-3-96849-053-3
- Brer Rabbit, Harmondsworth, Middx: Penguin, Puffin, c. 1944
- Dandy in the Circus, New York: Dodd, Mead, 1950
- Dandy the Donkey, London: Nicholson & Watson, 1943
- 8192 Crazy Costumes in One Book...For Children from 5 and under to 75 and over, London: Atrium
- 8192 Crazy People in One Book, London: Atrium, c. 1950
- 8192 Quite Crazy People in One Book, London: Atrium, [1949?]
- 10 Little Negroes: A New Version, London: Sylvan, 1944

=== Books by others illustrated by Trier ===
- Colman, Fred A. "Artisten" (1928)
- Földes, Jolán, Peter verliert nicht den Kopf (translated from Hungarian by Stefan J. Klein)
- Harris, Joel Chandler, Brer Rabbit
- Hirschfeld, Ludwig, Wien und Budapest
- Hochstetter, Gustav, Maruschka braut gelibbtes!
- Kästner, Erich, Das doppelte Lottchen (Lisa and Lottie; republished as The Parent Trap in the United Kingdom and Australia) (1949)
- Kästner, Erich, Der 35 Mai (The 35th of May)
- Kästner, Erich, Till Eulenspiegel the Clown, Till the Jester, and Eleven Merry Pranks of Till the Jester
- Kästner, Erich, Emil und die Detektive (Emil and the Detectives)
- Kästner, Erich, Emil und die drei Zwillinge (Emil and the Three Twins)
- Kästner, Erich, Das fliegende Klassenzimmer (The Flying Classroom)
- Kästner, Erich, Des Freiherrn von Münchhausen wunderbare Reisen und Abenteuer zu Wasser und zu Lande (Baron Munchhausen)
- Kästner, Erich, Der gestiefelte Kater (Puss in Boots)
- Kästner, Erich, Der kleine Grenzverkehr, oder, Georg und die Zwischenfälle (A Salzburg Comedy)
- Kästner, Erich, Die Konferenz der Tiere (The Animals Conference)
- Kästner, Erich, Pünktchen und Anton (Annaluise and Anton)
- Kästner, Erich, Das verhexte Telefon
- Kipling, Rudyard, Das kommt davon
- Meyer, Alfred Richard, Die Reise in die Jugend
- Meyer, Wilhelm ("My"), Fridolins Harlekinder
- Meyer, Wilhelm ("My"), Fridolins Zauberland
- Meyer, Wilhelm ("My"), Fridolins Siebenmeilenpferd
- Morgan, Diana, My Sex Right or Wrong
- Nelson, Claire, The Jolly Picnic
- Roda Roda, Die verfolgte Unschuld
- Schloemp, Felix, Der Allotria Kientopp
- Schloemp, Felix, Schabernack und Lumpenpack
- Seth-Smith, David, Jolly Families
- Seyffert, Oskar, Spielzeug
- Twain, Mark, Die Abenteuer des Tom Sawyer
- Wiseman, Herbert, Singing Together

=== Periodicals to which Trier contributed ===
- Berliner Illustrirte Zeitung
- Daily Herald (London)
- Die Dame
- Jugend
- Lilliput
- Life
- Lustige Blätter
- New Liberty
- New York Times
- Saturday Night
- Simplicissimus
- Uhu
- Die Zeitung (London)

=== Books about Trier and anthologies of his works ===
- Clements, Warren, ed. The Many Worlds of Walter Trier: Inimitable Drawings of Baron Munchausen, Tom Sawyer, Emil, Brer Rabbit and Many, Many Others. Toronto: Nestlings Press, 2019. ISBN 9781775343639
- Humorist Walter Trier: Selections from the Trier-Fodor Foundation Gift. The Art Gallery of Ontario, 1981. ISBN 0-919876-56-0
- Jesters in Earnest. London: Murray, 1944. Cartoons by Trier and four other Czechoslovak artists.
- Kästner, Erich, ed. Heiteres von Walter Trier. Hanover: Fackelträger-Verl., 1959.
- Lang. Lothar, ed. Walter Trier im Eulenspiegel-Verlag. [East] Berlin: Eulenspiegel-Verlag, 1971. Munich: Rogner & Bernhard, 1971. ISBN 3-920802-59-4
- Lang, Lothar, ed. Das grosse Trier-Buch. [East] Berlin: Eulenspiegel-Verlag, 1972; Munich and Zurich: Piper, 1974. (New editions: 1984 and 1986.)
- Lilliput: Walter Trier's World. Tokyo: Pie, 2004. ISBN 4-89444-367-8 Presents 99 of Trier's covers for Lilliput; text in both Japanese and English.
- Neuner-Warthorst, Antje. "Da bin ich wieder!": Walter Trier - die Berliner Jahre. Berlin: SMPK, 1999. ISBN 3-88609-189-9
- Trier, Walter. Kleines Trier-Paradies. Zurich: Sanssouci-Verlag, 1955.
- Trier Panoptikum. Berlin: Eysler, 1922.
- Neuner-Warthorst, Antje, Walter Trier: Politik - Kunst - Reklame, Zürich: Atrium 2006.

== See also ==
- List of Germans who resisted Nazism
- Trier (disambiguation)
