= Berliner Börsen-Courier =

German newspaper (1868–1933)

- Modern daily paper for all areas
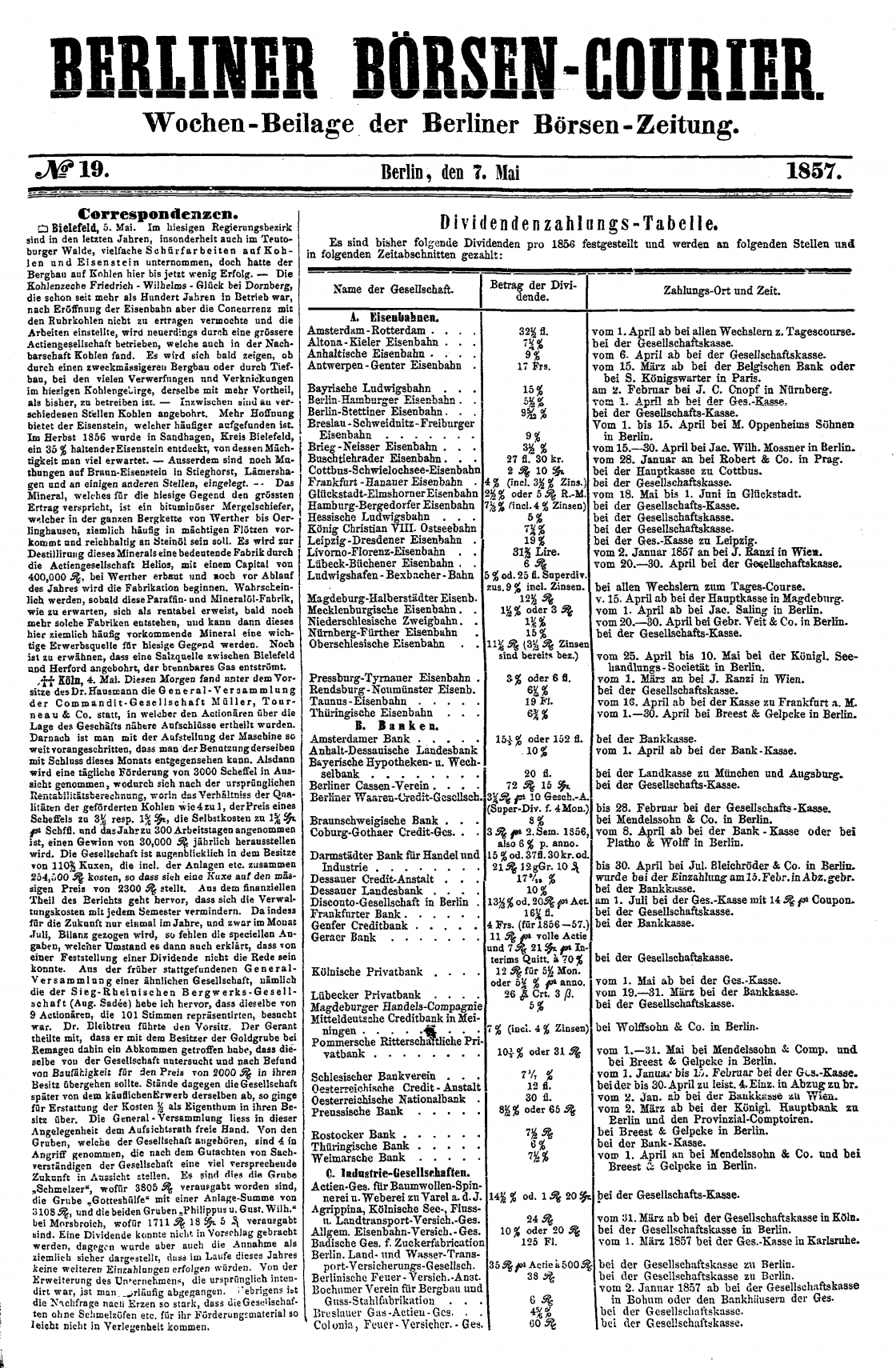
- Newspaper front page of Berliner Börsen-Courier as of 7 May 1857, weekly supplement of Berliner Börsen-Zeitung (1855–1944)
- Type: Daily newspaper
- Founder: George Davidsohn
- Founded: 1868
- Ceased publication: 1933
- Political alignment: Left-liberal
- Language: German
- City: Berlin
- Country: Germany
- Circulation: 40,000 (as of 1927)

The Berliner Börsen-Courier (Berlin stock exchange courier, BBC) was a German left-liberal daily newspaper published from 1868 to 1933. It focused primarily on prices of securities traded on the stock exchanges and securities information about the mortgage market, but also featured news and reports from industry, commerce, politics and culture. It was subtitled: moderne Tageszeitung für alle Gebiete (modern daily paper for all areas).

== Concept and creation ==
The first issue appeared as a sample issue on 12 September 1868, while regular distribution began in October 1868. The daily issue appeared in the late afternoon, matching the trading hours on the stock exchange. On Sunday evening, the newspaper appeared under the name Station and was primarily a feuilleton. The daily paper had one page of political news and three pages of news and reports from trade and industry. In addition, there were four supplements: the Courszettel (stock list), advertising, the Station and a weekly supplement of real estate news.

Beginning on 1 January 1869, the paper came with a morning and an evening edition. The evening edition consisted mainly of the stock data, while the morning edition had mainly news and reports from the fields of politics, entertainment and culture. In the following years, the evening edition also was expanded with news and reports, also reports from the local area.

Between 1887 and 1891 the satirical magazine Lustige Blätter was published as a supplement of the paper.

== Founder and managing director ==
The founder of the paper, George Davidsohn (1835–1897), was trained as a banker and was a journalist at the Berliner Börsen-Zeitung (BBZ, Berlin stock exchange newspaper). He thus managed to make the Börsen-Courier economically stable. He also raised the bar in newspaper quality when it came to the speed of publication and the level of reporting. He was connected to Berlin's artistic scene and made the paper "an influential force in Berlin culture". The Börsen-Courier was "freisinnig", leftist-liberal, and stood against anti-Semitism. When the economic crisis reached the Börsen-Courier in the years 1875 to 1877, Davidsohn's brother Robert Davidsohn (1853-1937) took over the business of the newspaper and converted it into a public company in 1884.

The increased demands for timely news led to the introduction of flexible working hours and the installment of a night editor. From the 1880s, reports of foreign exchanges were published and reports were accompanied by statistics and forecasts. The paper incorporated as a supplement the Berliner Wespen, a paper Julius Stettenheim had created for humor and satire. The Börsen-Courier was the first newspaper in Berlin reporting from the Reichstag. It was also the first newspaper that had a reporter for sport, from 1885, who developed a sports section.

== Culture, circulation, termination ==
Reports on culture were of prime importance in the Börsen-Courier. It was said in Germany that no theater office could do without its information. Journalists included Paul Lindau responsible for theater, Ernst von Wildenbruch for literature, Eugen Richter heading the feuilleton, Alfred Schütze and Paul Bormann for commerce, Benno Jacobsen for theater and Oskar Bie, writing on art. Joseph Roth worked for the paper from 1921. In 1922 critic Herbert Ihering made Bertolt Brecht known by a review of his first performed play Drums in the Night: "At 24 the writer Bert Brecht has changed Germany's literary complexion overnight [... he] has given our time a new tone, a new melody, a new vision. [...] It is a language you can feel on your tongue, in your gums, your ear, your spinal column." On 20 April 1924, the paper published an essay by Franz Kafka, "Adalbert Stifter". In the two editions of 11 January 1927, Herbert Ihering reviewed the premiere of the film Metropolis.

In the 1920s all Berlin papers were changed to a new format, the "Berliner". Beginning on 24 August 1924, the Börsen-Courier was subtitled Moderne Tageszeitung (Modern daily paper). In 1914 it had a circulation of 11,000, in 1923 between 50,000 and 60,000. From 1925 to 1927 the circulation was about 40,000.

On 24 December 1932 the Berliner Börsen-Zeitung announced that it had bought out the shares of the Börsen-Courier. On 31 December 1933 the last issue was printed, #609. The BBZ was merged with the Deutsche Allgemeine Zeitung in 1944.

== Literature ==
- Oskar Loerke, Hermann Kasack, Reinhard Tgahrt: Der Bücherkarren: Besprechungen im Berliner Börsen-Courier 1920–1928, Heidelberg 1965
- Heinz-Dietrich Fischer: Deutsche Presseverleger des 18. bis 20. Jahrhunderts, Pullach 1975
- Ursula E. Koch: Berliner Presse und europäisches Geschehen 1871: eine Untersuchung über die Rezeption der großen Ereignisse im 1. Halbjahr 1871 in den politischen Tageszeitungen der deutschen Reichshauptstadt, Berlin 1978
- Klaus Täubert: Emil Faktor: Ein Mann und (s)eine Zeitung, Berlin 1994, ISBN 3-89468-107-1
- Jürgen Wilke: Unter Druck gesetzt: vier Kapitel deutscher Pressegeschichte, Köln 2002
- Konrad Dussel: Deutsche Tagespresse im 19. und 20. Jahrhundert, Münster 2004
