= Alexander Moszkowski =

German writer (1851–1934)

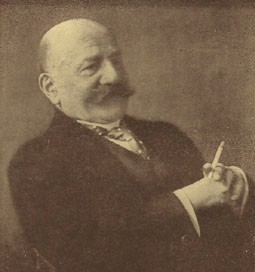
- Moszkowski in the 1920s
- Born: 15 January 1851; Pilica, Congress Poland, Russian Empire
- Died: 26 September 1934 (aged 83); Berlin, Germany
- Occupation: Satirist
- Writing career
- Notable work: Einstein: Einblicke in seine Gedankenwelt

Alexander Moszkowski (15 January 1851 – 26 September 1934) was a German satirist, writer and philosopher also of Polish-Jewish descent. He was the brother of the composer and pianist Moritz Moszkowski.

He was a friend of many celebrities in Berlin, among them the theoretical physicist Albert Einstein, about whom he was the first to publish a book in the summer of 1920 and consequently popularize the theory of relativity. In his autobiography he wrote: "At the beginning of the 20th century the question of the conceivability of other worlds with modified physics and mathematics will be highly employed."

== Life ==
He was born on 15 January 1851 in Pilica, near Prussia-Russia border. His parents emigrated the following year to Breslau where he grew up with his brother Moritz, who later achieved fame as a pianist and composer. As a young man Alexander Moszkowski moved to Berlin where he met Julius Stettenheim, who noticed his qualities as a writer and hired him for his satirical magazine Berliner Wespen, in which he worked from 1877 until 1886. However, there being many differences between Stettenheim and him, he founded his own satirical magazine, the Lustige Blätter, which reached large print runs particularly in the Weimar of the time.

Moszkowski was from 1892 a member of the Gesellschaft der Freunde. He was a personality of the Berliner society, and with celebrities such as Albert Einstein, he was among the first writers to bring the Theory of Relativity to a wider audience. He died on 26 September 1934 in Berlin.

== Works ==
In addition to his satirical works, the work of Moszkowski includes many popular language, philosophy and science-fiction books like his 1922 novel Die Inseln der Weisheit (The Islands of Wisdom), in which he prophetically described mobile telephones and holography and the acceleration of our present-day high-tech information society.

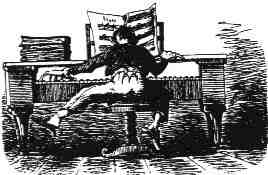
Illustration for Alexander Moszkowski's satire Anton Notenquetscher by Philipp Scharwenka.

- Marinirte Zeitgeschichte, Gesammelte Humoresken (1884)
- Anton Notenquetscher's Lustige Fahrten (1895)
- Das Buch der 1000 Wunder (1916)
- Sokrates der Idiot (1917)
- Der Sprung über den Schatten (1917)
- Die Ehe im Rückfall und andere Anzüglichkeiten (1918)
- Das Geheimnis der Sprache (1920)
- Die Welt von der Kehrseite (1920)
- Der Venuspark, Phantasien über Liebe und Philosophie (1920)
- Fröhlicher Jammer, Ein Vortrags-Brevier (1922)
- Einstein : Einblicke in seine Gedankenwelt : gemeinverständliche Betrachtungen über die Relativitätstheorie und ein neues Weltsystem (1922). Translated to English by Henry L. Brose as Conversations with Einstein (1970)
- Das Panorama meines Lebens (1924)

== Sources ==
- This article is based on the translation of the corresponding article of the German Wikipedia. A List of contributors can be found there at the History section.
