= Oskar Bie =

German art historian and publicist (1864–1938)

Oskar Bie (9 February 1864 – 21 April 1938) was a German art historian and author of Jewish origin.

== Life ==
Born in Breslau, Bie studied philosophy, art and music history at the universities of Breslau and Leipzig as well as at the Technische Hochschule in Charlottenburg (now Technische Universität Berlin). In 1886, he achieved his doctorate and habilitated in 1890 at the Technische Hochschule Charlottenburg in art history.

From 1894 1922, he was the chief editor of the literary magazine Die neue Rundschau and made it one of the leading cultural monthly magazines in Germany. As a critic of opera, music and art, he worked for the papers Berliner Börsen-Courier and Die Weltbühne.

In 1901, Bie was appointed professor. He taught aesthetics at the Musikhochschule Berlin from 1921. No reprints of his books were allowed after 1933.

He died in Berlin.

== Selected publications ==
- Zwischen den Künsten. Beiträge zur modernen Ästhetik (1895)
- Die Musen in der antiken Kunst (1887)
- Das Klavier und seine Meister (1898)
- Der Tanz als Kunstwerk (1905)
- Die moderne Musik und Richard Strauss (1906)
- Constantin Somoff (1907)
- Reise um die Kunst (1910)
- Die Oper (1913)
- Das Deutsche Lied (1926)
