= The Islands of Wisdom =

1922 novel by Alexander Moszowski

The Islands of Wisdom: The Story of an Adventurous Expedition
- Author: Alexander Moszkowski
- Original title: Die Inseln der Weisheit: Geschichte einer abenteuerlichen Entdeckungsfahrt
- Language: German
- Subject: Social and political ideas of European philosophy / utopias
- Genre: Science fiction, satire
- Set in: Berlin and Pacific Islands
- Publication date: 1922
- Publication place: Weimar Republic

Die Inseln der Weisheit (The Islands of Wisdom) is a 1922 novel by Alexander Moszkowski that features expeditions to various utopian and dystopian islands that embody various social-political ideas of European philosophy and extrapolates them for their absurdities when they are put into practice.

The novel's "island of technology" Sarragalla anticipates mobile telephones and a thorough mechanization of life.

The satire of utopias also reproduces the society described in Plato's The Republic.

== Characters ==
- Alexander Moszkowski, author and first-person narrator
- Donath Flohr, friend of the narrator
- Mr. Mac Lintock, multimillionaire from Chicago
- Eva Mac Lintock, his niece
- Ralph Kreyher, captain of the ship Atalanta
- Geo Rotteck, ship's officer
- Dr. Melchior Wehner, ship's doctor
