= Free Exhibitions =

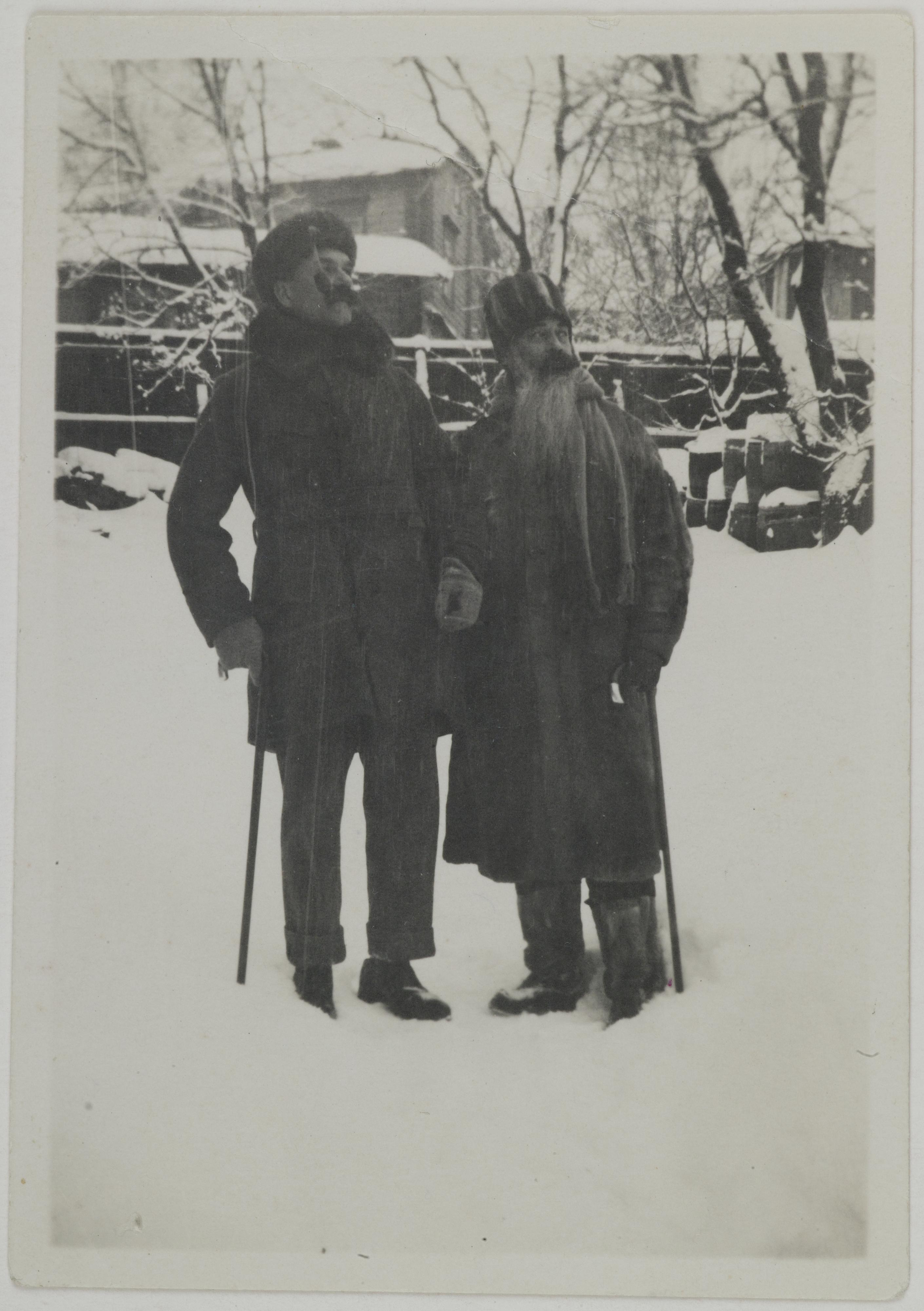
Wettenhovi-Aspa (right), with Akseli Gallén-Kallela. (1922)

The Free Exhibitions (Swedish: Den Fria Konstutställningen, Finnish: Vapaat taidenäyttelyt) were art exhibitions organized in Helsinki, Finland in the years 1896, 1898, 1900 and 1903. They were labeled "free" because they did not have a jury to decide whose paintings or sculptures could be on display as other art exhibitions in Finland did at the time. These exhibitions were organized by the artist Sigurd Wettenhovi-Aspa (1870–1946), who also had the largest number of works displayed in all of the Free Exhibitions. The artist Torsten Wasastjerna was also involved in the organization of the first two exhibitions. The exhibitions attracted attention among the press and public and even a few of Finland's most famous artists, including Eero Järnefelt and Walter Runeberg, participated in one of them. However, the exhibitions gradually lost their popularity, and at the last exhibition in 1903, Sigurd Wettenhovi-Aspa and his brother Ragnar Asp were the only two exhibitors.

== Wettenhovi-Aspa as an artist ==
Wettenhovi-Aspa studied art in Denmark, where he was taught by artists such as Kristian Zahrtmann and Peder Severin Krøyer. In 1892, Wettenhovi-Aspa moved to Paris after he was awarded a grant. While living in Paris, Wettenhovi-Aspa took part in the Salon de la Rose + Croix in 1893 with Finnish sculptor Ville Vallgren and in Salon de Champ-de-Mars in 1894. In 1895, he was awarded a gold medal in an art exhibition in St. Etienne, France. Wettenhovi-Aspa had made his debut as a painter in 1891 in the Finnish Art Society's exhibition. He was a regular participant in Finnish art exhibitions in the late 19th and early 20th centuries, but he also arranged many exhibitions in Finland and other Nordic countries. Throughout his career, Wettenhovi-Aspa was seen in the Finnish press as a person seeking publicity and sensation whose art was at best controversial and amateurish. Wettenhovi-Aspa was a much contested figure in the Finnish art world, but at the same time, he was friends with many famous Finnish creative artists including composer Jean Sibelius and painter Akseli Gallén-Kallela.

== Free exhibitions ==
=== 1896 ===
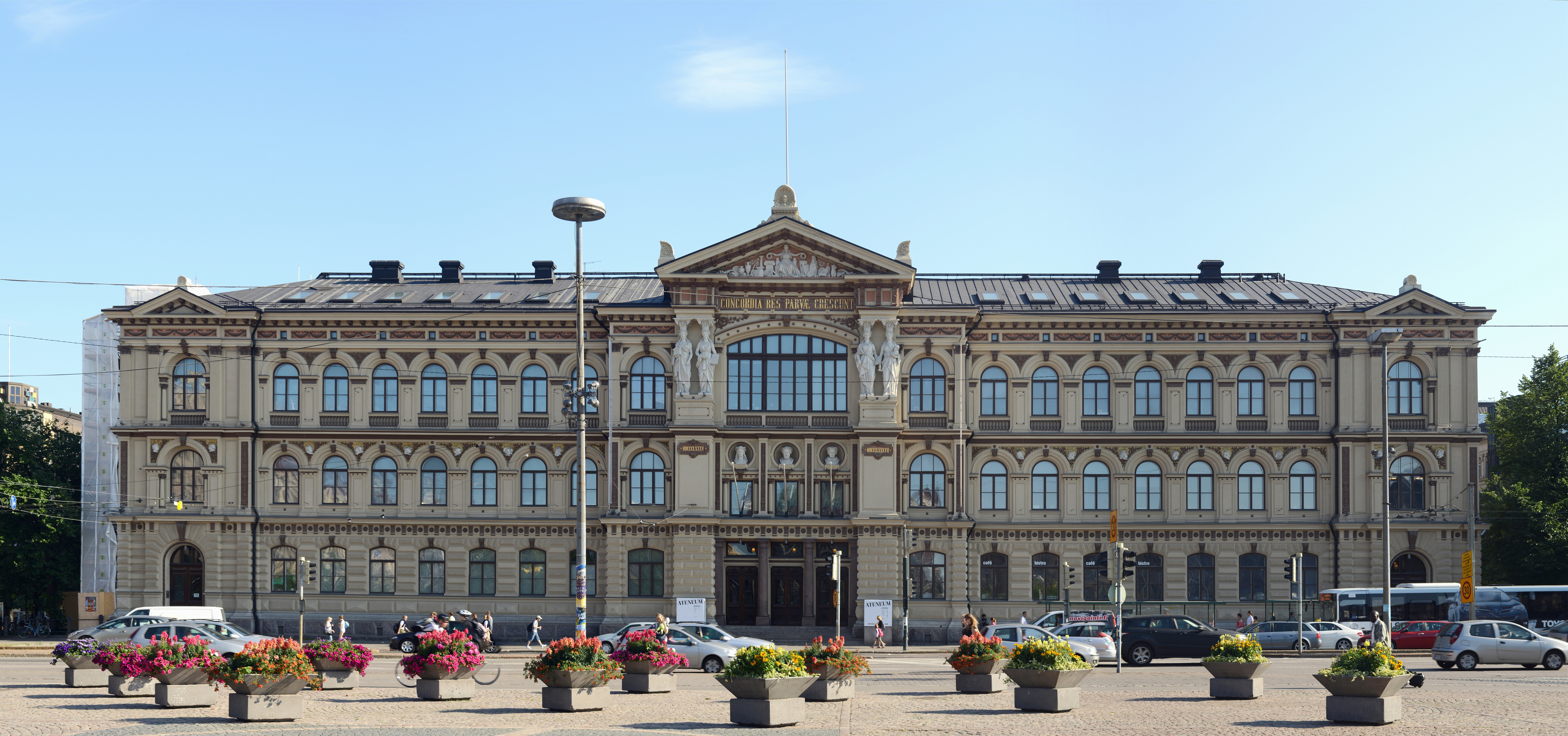
The Ateneum in Helsinki (2013)

All willing artists were urged to send their works to this Free Exhibition, which opened on 10 December 1896 in the Ateneum Art Museum's hall. The exhibition closed on 10 January 1897 and was seen by over 3,000 paying visitors. Wettenhovi-Aspa displayed 85 works of art and was thus the most substantial exhibitor. The other artists in the first Free Exhibition were Wettenhovi-Aspa's wife Divina Asp, his brother Ragnar Asp, co-organizer Torsten Wasastjerna, Thorsten Waenerberg, C. E. Sjöstrand, Karin Nordenswan and Miss Boldt. The exhibition expanded after its opening as artists like A. J. Rapp send their work to be exhibited there. As the majority of the art work on view was Wettenhovi-Aspa's, the press had the notion that the Free Exhibition was, in fact, his solo exhibition. Likely due to this, the other artists' pieces were not reviewed as closely as Wettenhovi-Aspa's. The press seemed to believe that in an open exhibition the works of art on display were weak and inadequate; paintings or sculptures made with skill were not expected to be encountered. Generally speaking, the press responded to the exhibition critically and questioned its artistic value. Nonetheless, the first Free Exhibition was also described as interesting, worth the visit and possessing potential.

=== 1898 ===
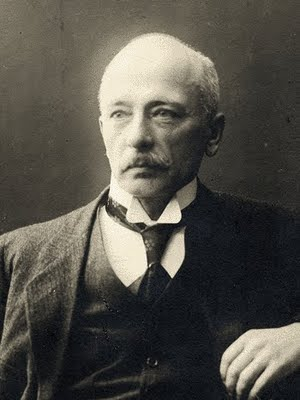
Eero Järnefelt (1920s)

The second Free Exhibition opened on 2 April 1898 in the Ateneum Art Museum's hall, once again organized by Sigurd Wettenhovi-Aspa and Torsten Wasastjerna. Twenty-three painters and four sculptors entered the exhibition; in addition, there were nine unsigned works. The artists were Walter Runeberg, Thorsten Waenerberg, Eero Järnefelt, Carl Eneas Sjöstrand, Alex Federley, Vilhelm Sjöström, J. Montell, Hanna Rönnberg, G. Rosinsky, Oskar Svenberg, Alexander Barkoff, Arthur Harald Gallén, Maria Kolnitsch, Baron Taube, A. J. Rapp, H. Sjernvall, J. F. Tuhkanen, Adolf von Becker, Hugo Backmansson, A. Sandberg, Elis Nyström, A. Loux, Ragnar Asp, Divina Asp and naturally Sigurd Wettenhovi-Aspa and Torsten Wasastjerna. Wettenhovi-Aspa had on display several sculptures and approximately 20 paintings. In total, there were 120 words of art being exhibited; of these, 106 were paintings and the rest were sculptures. The exhibition expanded again after its opening when J. E. Engelberg, among others, sent a few landscapes to be displayed. The second Free Exhibition closed on 26 April 1898, and in all, it had over 4,000 visitors. Once again, the exhibition was seen in the press as mainly an exhibition of Wettenhovi-Aspa's works. Other artists' did not receive as much notice as Wettenhovi-Aspa, with the exception of Alexander Barkoff, whose art was seen both as trash and interesting. Some of the critics regarded the exhibition as refreshing and interesting and wished it plenty of visitors. Others considered the exhibition substandard.

=== 1900 ===
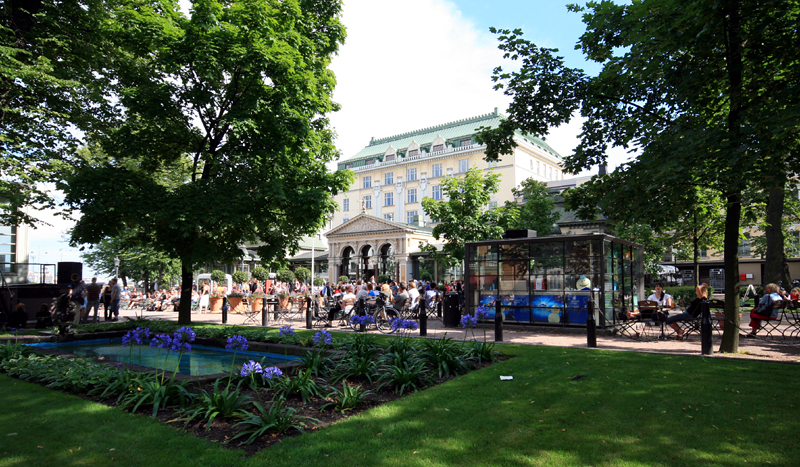
The Kappeli Restaurant (2007)

Wettenhovi-Aspa organized the third Free Exhibition alone in 1900. The exhibition opened on 11 November 1900, and unlike the previous two exhibitions, was not held in the Ateneum Art Museum because it was under renovation. Instead, the exhibition was organized in the Kappeli Restaurant on Helsinki's Esplanade. There were 9 participants in the third Free Exhibition: Sigurd Wettenhovi-Aspa, his brother Ragnar Asp, Alexander Barkoff, John Rafael Eklund, Teuvo Koskelo, Arvid Liljelund, A. J. Rapp, Karl Walter Smedberg and an artist going by the pseudonym "Henni". Arvid Liljelund's artwork was exhibited posthumously. The exhibition closed on 11 November 1900, and during the month it was open, it had over 5,700 visitors. Press focused once again mainly on criticizing Wettenhovi-Aspa and his works of art. Alexander Barkoff was said to stand out, and the other artists who were exhibited were mentioned only briefly. The exhibition was, yet again, seen as Wettenhovi-Aspa's solo exhibition. The exhibition's critiques were somewhat inconsistent. While some reporters said the artwork on display was ugly and amateurish, others felt the exhibition gave pleasure and food for thought.

=== 1903 ===
The fourth and the last Free Exhibition opened to the public on 5 April 1903. The venue was once again the Ateneum Art Museum. There were musical performances in the opening, and it was announced as the biggest and the most interesting Free Exhibition to date. The only exhibitors in the fourth Free Exhibition were Sigurd Wettenhovi-Aspa and his brother Ragnar Asp. Wettenhovi-Aspa had 47 pieces of artwork on display and Ragnar Asp had six. Wettenhovi-Aspa's pieces were history paintings, portraits, landscapes and busts. Ragnar Asp had made a few landscapes and a copy of a Rembrandt. Also, J. E. Engelberg sent a large landscape to the exhibition to be put on display after the opening. The exhibition was said to have had a substantial number of visitors when it closed on 28 April 1903. Because Wettenhovi-Aspa and his brother were the only participants in the exhibition, the press focused on Wettenhovi-Aspa's artwork and wrote virtually nothing about Ragnar Asp. Generally, it was thought that Wettenhovi-Aspa had grand ideas but that his technique was not good enough to realize them.

=== In relation to other art exhibitions in Nordic countries and in France ===
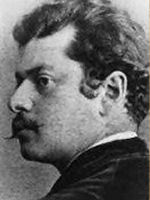
Ernest Josephson

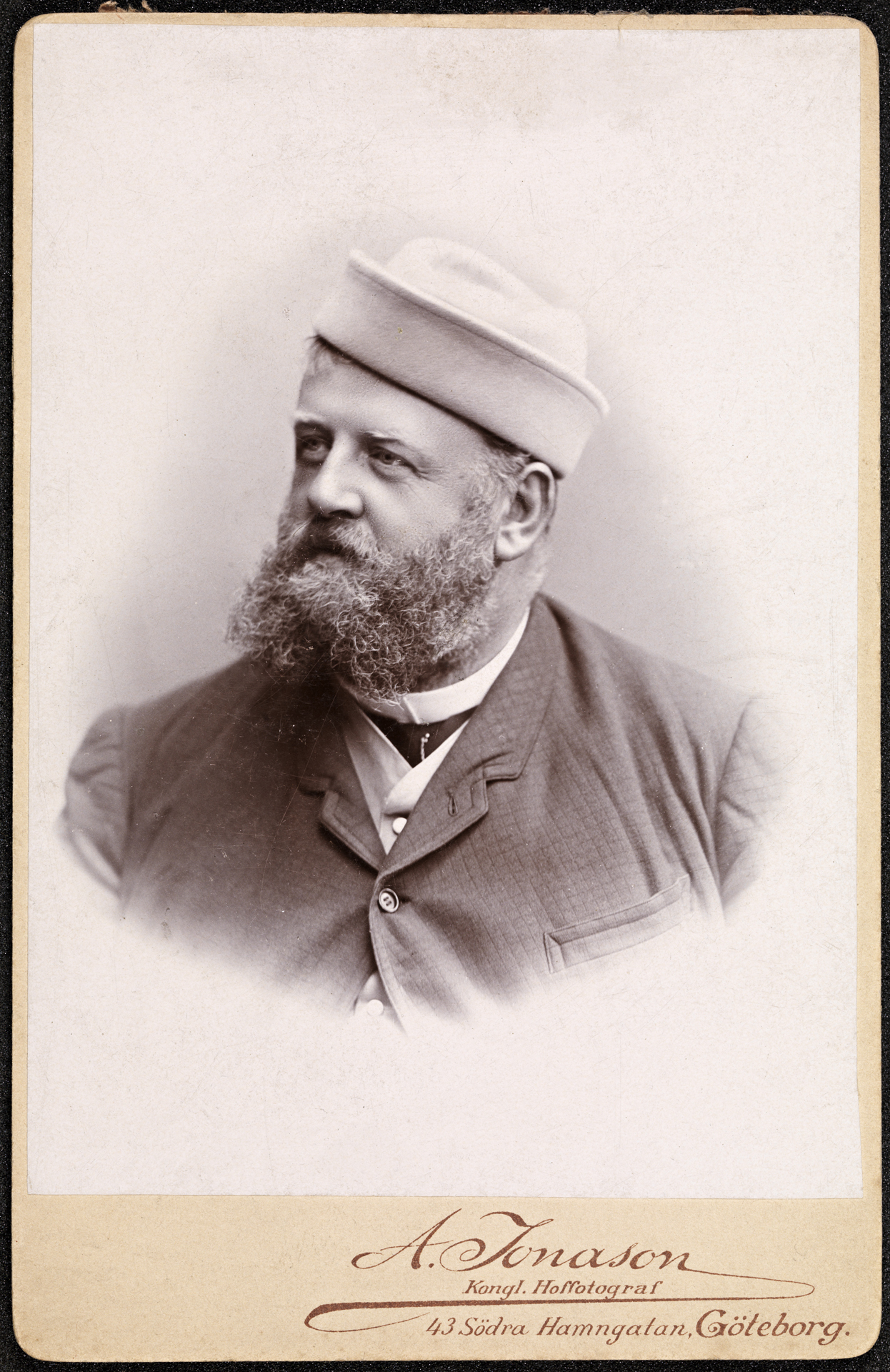
Frits Thaulow

Art life in Nordic countries was changing in the late 19th century. Old traditions were questioned and new art exhibitions were founded. Swedish artists, including Carl Larsson and Ernst Josephson, had founded an artists' society named Konstnärsförbundet in 1886. The society protested against the Swedish art life and education, both of which were thought to be stagnant. The Royal Swedish Academy of Arts arranged exhibitions sporadically, but Konstnärsförbundet held an annual exhibition from the year 1886 onwards. In 1882 in Norway, artists, including Frits Thaulow and Christian Krohg, established The Autumn Exhibition as an objection to Christiania's Art Society, which was viewed as bourgeois. Anyone could nominate their artwork to the exhibition, but there was a jury deciding whose pieces would be put on display. In Denmark, Den Frie Udstilling was founded in 1891 by young Danish artists. The Royal Danish Academy of Fine Arts was considered too conservative at the time and the artists wanted to create an alternative for their juried exhibitions. Den Frie Udstilling continues to arrange exhibitions that are free to all artists today. It could be argued that Den Frie Udstilling in Denmark and the Salon de la Rose + Croix in France influenced Wettenhovi-Aspa when he was living in Copenhagen and Paris. He might have wanted to bring something similar to the Finnish art world to what he had seen in Europe. The name Free Exhibition, Fria Utställningen, is the first obvious indicator that the Danish exhibitions might have been the model for the Finnish Free Exhibitions. Another indicator is the fact that Wettenhovi-Aspa was living in Denmark when Den Frie Udstilling was founded in 1891 and also took his Free Exhibition to Copenhagen in 1901. Additionally, Salon des Indépendants was a juryless exhibition, and in that regard, the similarities between it and the Free Exhibitions can be seen. As mentioned previously, Wettenhovi-Aspa took part in the Salon de la Rose + Croix.

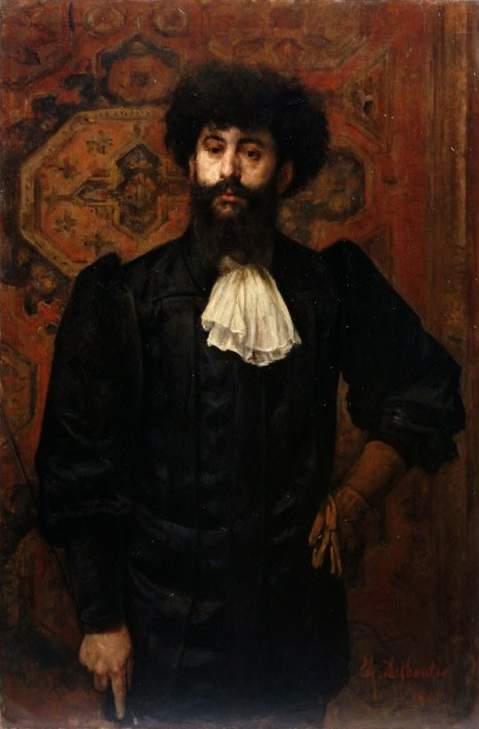
Joséphin Péladan

The founder of the salon, Joséphin Péladan, was a peculiar character in late 19th century Paris who might have influenced the young Wettenhovi-Aspa. Similarities between Péladan and Wettenhovi-Aspa are found upon examination of their public personas. They both organized exhibitions that had grandiose openings with musical performances. In addition, Wettenhovi-Aspa arranged a game of tombola as part of the second Free Exhibition's opening. Also, they were both ridiculed and criticized for organizing their exhibitions. The purpose of Free Exhibitions was said to be giving young artists an opportunity to get their art on view without the restrictions of a jury. An alternative motive for organizing Free Exhibitions might have been Wettenhovi-Aspa's wish to gain more visibility for his own art. One plausible explanation for the Free Exhibitions running their course might be that they were at first interesting to the public, but as a result of their artistic value being weak, the public lost their interest and its attitude became even derisive. Furthermore, the Free Exhibitions in Finland were perhaps identified too much with one person and because of this were a fleeting phenomenon in the Finnish art history.

== Sources ==
- Lindell, Elisa: Vapaat taidenäyttelyt 1896–1903 eurooppalaisessa ja suomalaisessa kontekstissa – Sigurd Wettenhovi-Aspan rooli. Thesis in art history. Department of Arts and Cultural Studies, University of Jyväskylä 2014.
