= Emil Faktor =

German writer

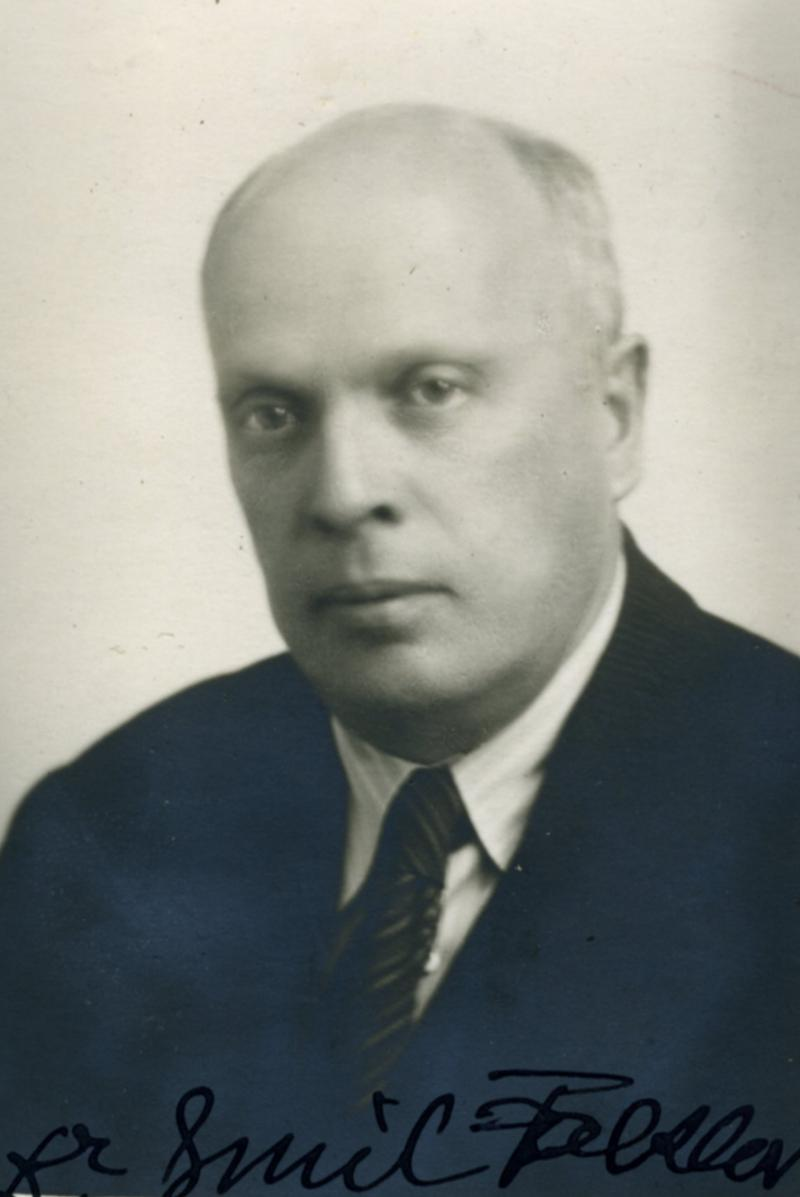
- Faktor in 1940
- Born: 31 August 1876; Prague, Bohemia, Austria-Hungary
- Died: 10 April 1942 (aged 65); Litzmannstadt Ghetto, Warthgau, Germany
- Occupations: Theatre critic Newspaper editor Writer-journalist
- Spouse: Sophie Sack (1890-1942)
- Children: Richard Faktor (lawyer: 1914-1942); Lili Faktor/Flechtheim (1917-2004)
- Parent(s): Eduard (שמעון) Faktor (ca. 1832 - 1910); Theresia (ריזל) Reimann (?-1899)

Emil Faktor (31 August 1876 – 10 April 1942) was a German language theater critic, editor and writer. Sources sometimes identify him as "Jussuf" which was the pseudonym under which his regular contributions to the Berliner Börsen-Courier (newspaper) appeared.

== Biography ==
Faktor was the son of German Jews. He studied law in his home city and received a doctorate of law degree in 1904. He also worked as an editor and critic for Bohemia magazine. In 1908 he moved from Prague to Berlin, where he wrote for the illustrated daily newspaper Der Tag. From 1912 he was responsible the "Feuilleton" section along with theater and music editorship at the Berliner Börsen-Courier (literally, "Berlin Stock Exchange Courier"), for which he became editor-in-chief in 1917. In the following years, he became one of the city's best-known theater critics.

Emil Faktor married Sophie Sack around 1913. Their children Richard and Lili were born in 1914 and 1917 during the war years. Fourteen years younger than her husband, Sophie Sack was a talented concert pianist whose teachers had included Artur Schnabel. As was so often the case at that time, she married just as her professional career was beginning to take off, and domestic duties now took precedence.

In addition to his journalistic work, Faktor also wrote poetry and plays. Among others, he published poetry books What I Seek (1899) and Jahresringe (1908), and comedies The Temperate (1914) and The Daughter (1917).

In 1931 Faktor was forced to resign - reportedly "at his own wish" - from his post as editor-in-chief because of his Jewish ancestry. In 1933 he returned with his wife Sophie to Prague. There he continued to work as a freelance journalist and critic for the Prague Tagblatt and the Prague Noon. The Faktors' daughter Lili fled to the United States of America in March 1939, and she arranged the affidavits necessary to permit her parents to follow her there, but the US authorities appear to have been applying restrictive immigration quotas: Emil and Sophie Faktor never obtained entry visas for the United States. On 21 October 1941 Faktor and his wife were deported from Prague and sent to the Litzmannstadt ghetto where they were killed on 10 April 1942.
