= Lustige Blätter =

Weekly German satirical magazine (1885–1944)

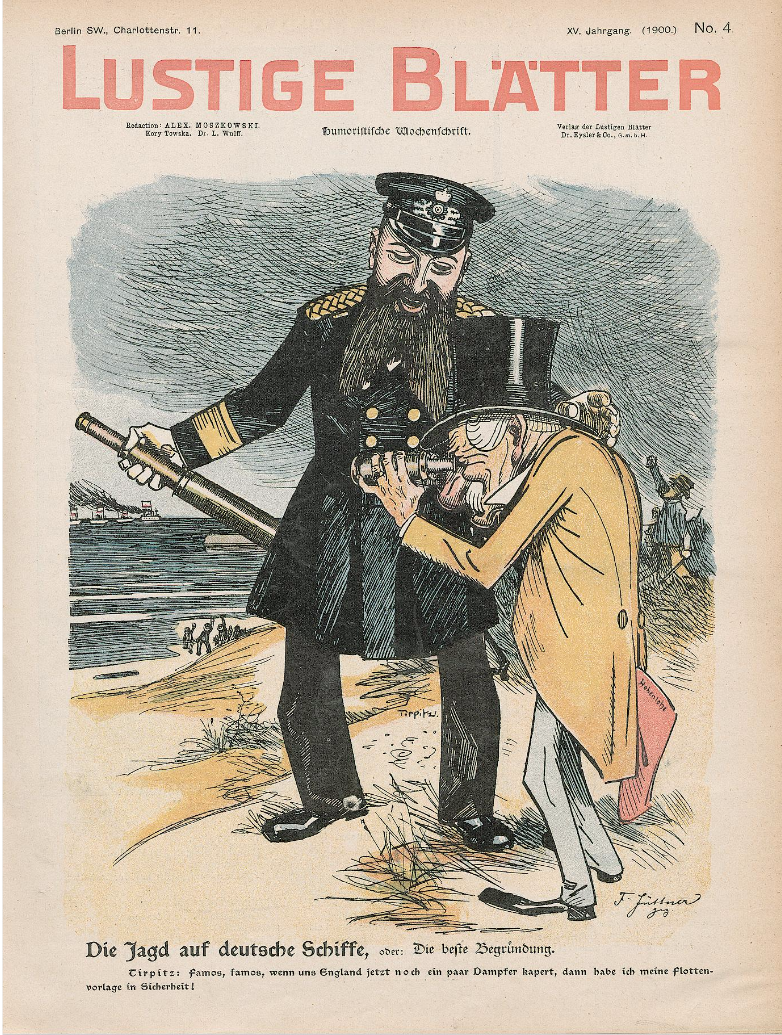
- Cover page of issue 4 dated 1900
- Categories: Satirical magazine
- Frequency: Weekly
- Publisher: Verlag Dr. Eysler & Co GmbH
- Founder: Alexander Moszkowski
- Founded: 1885
- Final issue: 1944
- Country: Germany
- Based in: Berlin
- Language: German
- OCLC: 10656989

Lustige Blätter (German: Comic Pages) was a satirical magazine published between 1885 and 1944 in Berlin. Its subtitle was schönstes buntes Witzblatt Deutschlands (German: Germany's most beautiful colorful humor paper).

== History and profile ==
Lustige Blätter was established by the writer Alexander Moszkowski in Berlin in 1885. From 1887 to 1891 it was a supplement to Berliner Börsen-Courier. Moszkowski and Paul von Schönthan were the founding editors-in-chief of the magazine. The former held the post until his retirement in 1927. The magazine was published on a weekly basis and featured satirical articles and cartoons about social and cultural events. Heinrich Zille, Lyonel Feininger, Walter Trier and Julius Klinger were among its leading caricaturists and illustrators. Other major contributors of the magazine were Bruno Balz, Betty Korytowska, Max Brinkmann, Rudolf Presber, Gustav Hochstetter, and Georg Mühlen-Schulte. Finnish cartoonist Sigurd Wettenhovi-Aspa also published his caricatures in the magazine which were mostly about the Russian Empire and Nicholas II. He was in exile in Paris during this period so that his caricatures were published anonymously.

The magazine held a liberal political stance. However, during the Nazi period it contained anti-semitic material. Lustige Blätter folded in 1944.
