= New Trier =

New Trier may refer to:

- New Trier Township, Illinois, United States
  - New Trier High School
- New Trier, Minnesota, United States
