= Sigurd Wettenhovi-Aspa =

Finnish artist (1870–1946)

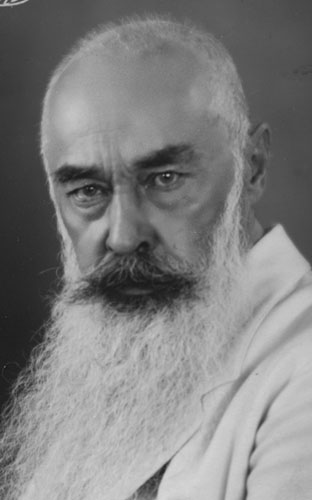
- Sigurd Wettenhovi Aspa in 1940
- Born: 7 May 1870; Georg Sigurd Wettenhovi Aspa Helsinki, Grand Duchy of Finland
- Died: 18 February 1946 (Age 75) Helsinki, Finland
- Resting place: Hietaniemi Cemetery, Helsinki
- Education: Royal Danish Academy of Fine Arts
- Occupations: Painter; Sculptor; Writer
- Known for: Free Exhibitions

Georg Sigurd Wettenhovi-Aspa (born. Wetterhoff-Asp, 7 May 1870 – 18 February 1946) was a Finnish multiartist: painter, sculptor, writer, and a pseudo-linguist. He is best known for his fantastical theories about the past of the Finnish people, whom he believed to have descended from Ancient Egypt.

Born in Helsinki, his parents were Georg August Asp (1834–1901), professor of anatomy at the University of Helsinki and Mathilda Sofia Wetterhoff (1840–1920), developer of female gymnastics.

Wettenhovi-Aspa studied art in Copenhagen in the Royal Danish Academy of Fine Arts from 1888 to 1891. He organized several art shows known as the Free Exhibitions. He died in Helsinki.

== Publications ==
- Pro patria (1900)
- La crise russe (1905)
- Finlands gyllene bok (1915)
- Lördagskvällar (1916)
- Receptsamling till goda inhemska bärviner, likörer och "nubbar" Receptsamling till goda inhemska bärviner, likörer och "nubbar" jämte några spikar till förbudslagens likkista av Jesus Kristus, Jesus Ben Syrach, Mårten Luther, Elias Lönnrot, Horatius, Ovidius, Shakespeare, A. von Hallen m.fl. (1919)
- Jutelmia ja muistelmia 1890-luvun Parisista ja August Strindbergin Inferno-vuosista. (1927)
- Fenno-ägyptischer Kulturursprung der alten Welt (1935)
- Kalevala ja Egypti. (1935)
- The Diamondking of Sahara (1935)
