= L'Illustration Européenne =

Belgian weekly newspaper

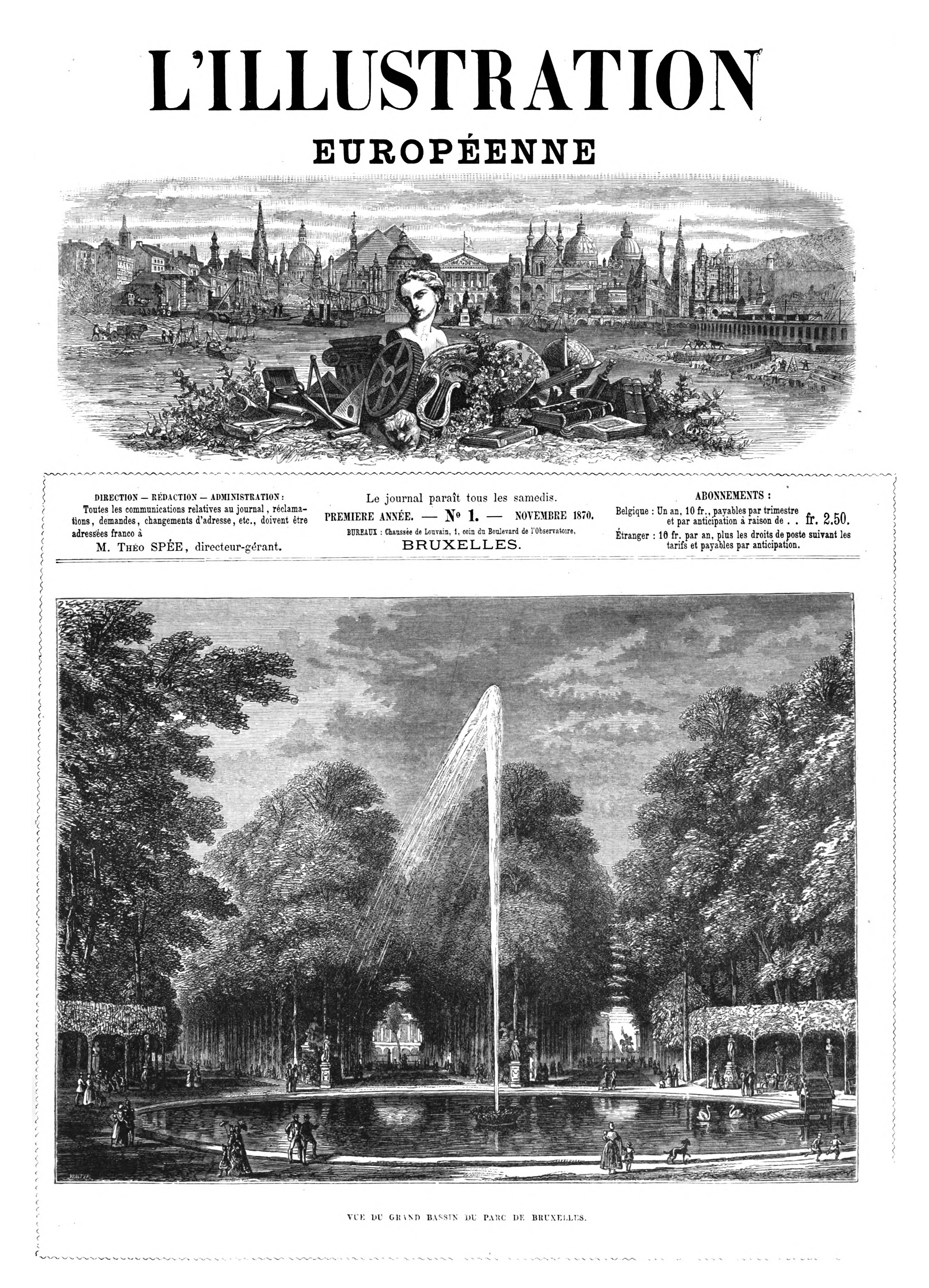
- Front page of the first issue
- Type: Illustrated weekly
- Founder: Théo Spée
- Launched: 19 November 1870
- Ceased publication: 1914
- Language: French
- City: Brussels
- Country: Belgium

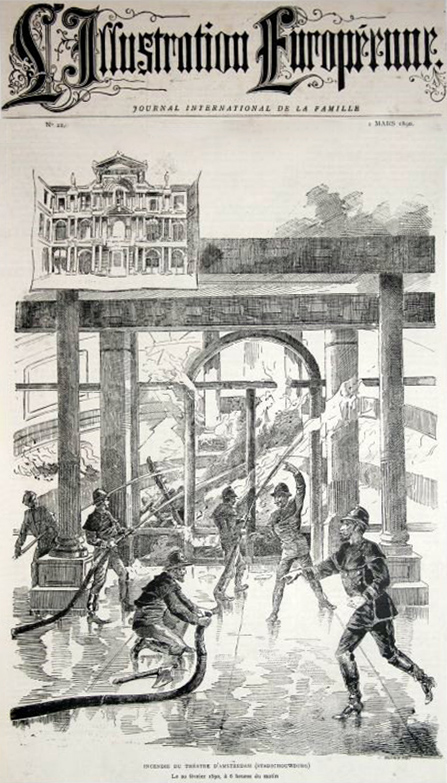
Front page, 1 March 1890, showing the fire at the Amsterdam Stadsschouwburg

L'Illustration Européenne (French pronunciation: [lilystʁasjɔ̃ øʁɔpeɛn]; 1870 – 1914) was a Belgian illustrated weekly newspaper providing general news, serialised fiction, historical anecdotes, short biographies of famous figures, and travel writing. The illustrations (portraits, views, and so forth) that accompanied the stories were the paper's main selling point. The first manager and editor was Théo Spée.

In 1885, L'Illustration Européenne became the first Belgian periodical to print a halftone photograph.

The owners of the Parisian illustrated weekly L'Illustration attempted to sue the owners of L'Illustration Européenne for unfair competition in having given their publication a misleadingly similar name. They were unsuccessful in the Belgian courts, but in 1888 did get the French courts to ban the sale of the Belgian weekly in France.
