= Julius Stettenheim =

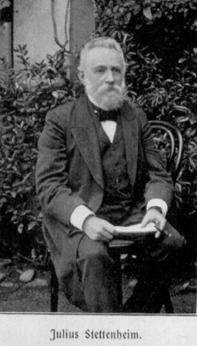
Julius Stettenheim

Julius Stettenheim (born 3 December 1831 in Hamburg, Germany, died 30 October 1916 in Lichterfelde) was a German writer, author of humorous sketches, farces and musical comedies, who also wrote under the pseudonym "Wippchen".
