= Rotterdamse Schouwburg =

Theatre in Rotterdam, Netherlands

Coordinates: 51.9201196°N 4.4740945°E

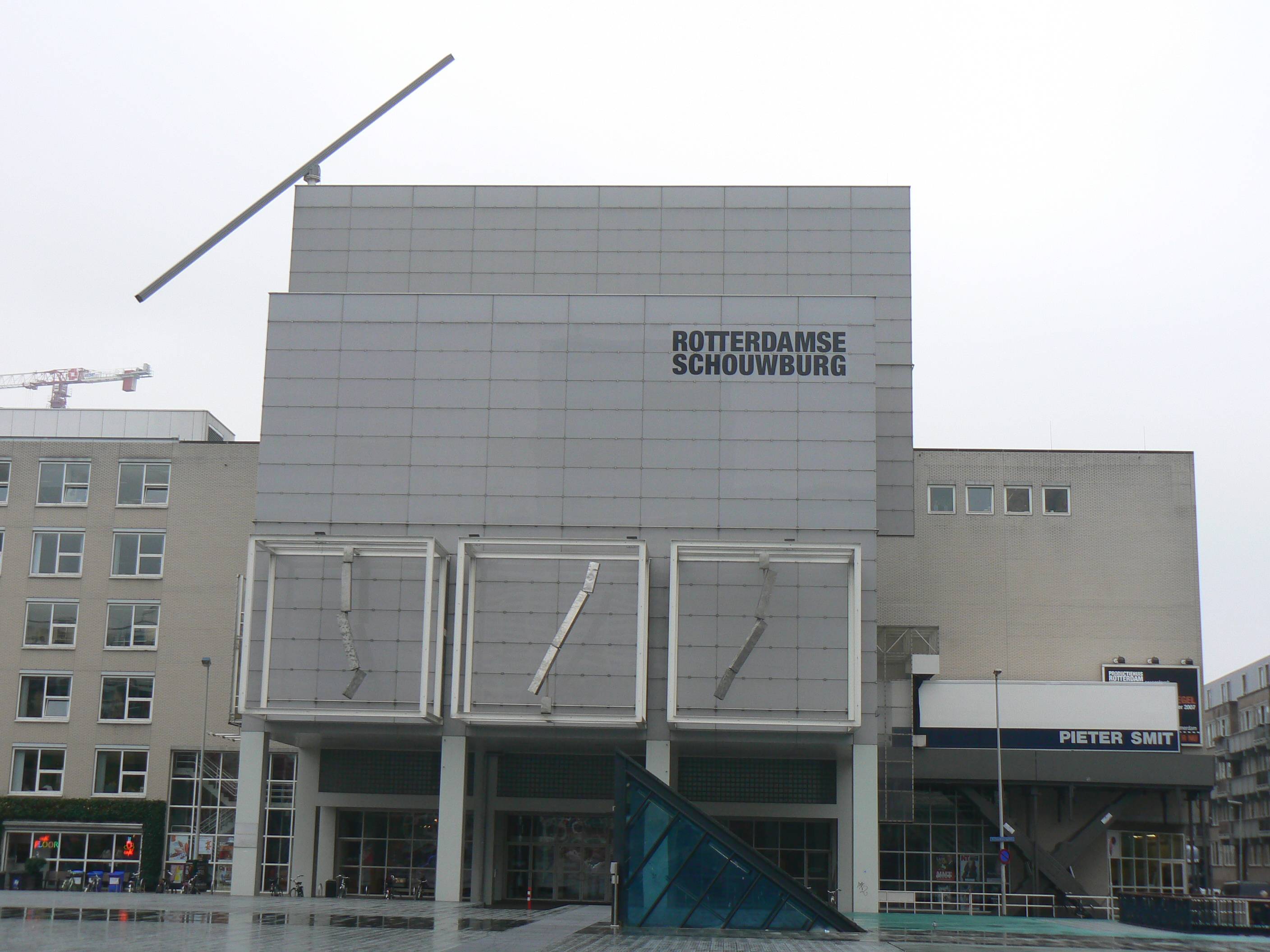
Outside of the theatre

Rotterdamse Schouwburg is a theatre in Rotterdam in The Netherlands.

The first theatre was constructed in 1773–1774. It was replaced by a second structure in stone in 1852. A third building was inaugurated in 1887. The third Rotterdamse Schouwburg was destroyed during the German bombing of Rotterdam in 1940.

The present building of the Rotterdamse Schouwburg was inaugurated in 1988 on address Schouwburgplein 25, 3012 CL Rotterdam
