= Johanna Wattier =

19th-century Dutch actress

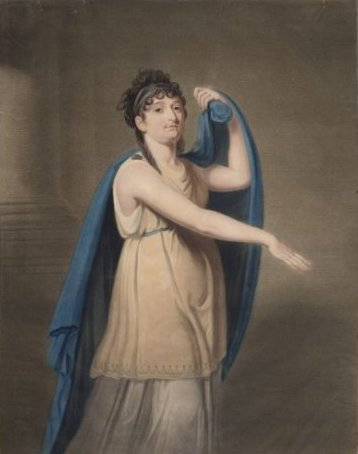
Johanna Cornelia Ziesenis-Wattier in the role of Epicharis for the Amsterdam Stadsschouwburg, by Charles Howard Hodges, 1805

Johanna Cornelia Wattier (Rotterdam, 13 April 1762 - Voorburg, 23 April 1827) was an 18th-century actress from the Northern Netherlands, known for her performances in Amsterdam. She made her debut at 15 in 1778 in Rotterdam and in 1780 at the Stadsschouwburg Amsterdam. After a few years she became the latter's main actress.

== Biography ==
She was the daughter of the dancing teacher Jean Baptiste Wattier and Anna Cornelia de Bourghelles. She married the architect and sculptor Bartholomeus Wilhelmus Henricus Ziesenis (1762-1820) in 1801, but continued to act, even after their son was born. She had debuted already as a child on the stage of Rotterdam with her siblings. In 1780, she was active in Amsterdam. She debuted there as Margaretha in the tragedy by William Havre Korn (1753? -1826) Aleid van Poelgeest. She became known as a great tragedienne, and in 1784 she became the premier actress of Amsterdam. She also toured. Wattier was the student of Marten Corver and is remembered as an example of the new natural way of acting, which became fashionable during her time at the stage. She was described as a natural talent, expressive and with a beautiful voice. In 1800, she was the highest-paid actor in the Netherlands. In 1806, Louis Bonaparte invited her to perform in Paris. In 1808 her yearly salary was f 4000, making her the best-paid actress of her times. When Napoleon himself visited Amsterdam in 1811, she performed for him, which impressed him so much he gave her a pension of F 2000. She retired from the stage for health reasons in 1815. She accompanied her husband to the Hague, where he was architect for renovations for the Noordeinde Palace.

Her portrait was painted by many leading artists of her day, and many poets wrote poems in her honor. When she died, the play running at the Rotterdam theatre was cancelled the day of her funeral.

Wattier was the sister-in-law of Ward Bingley.
