= Stadsschouwburg =

Theatre in Amsterdam

Coordinates: 52°21′50″N 4°52′55″E

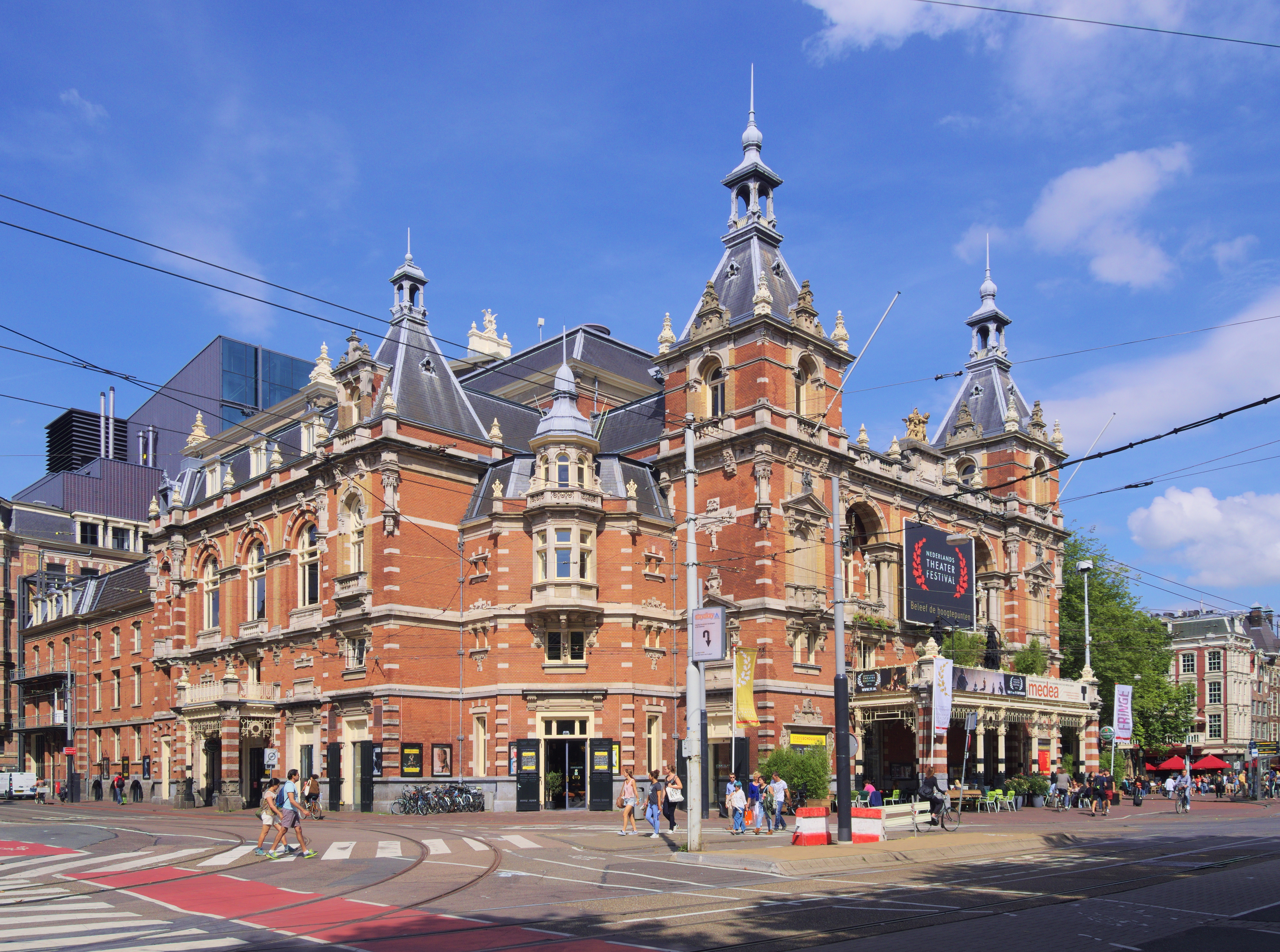
Present-day Stadsschouwburg

The Stadsschouwburg (Dutch pronunciation: [stɑtˈsxʌubʏr(ə)x]; Dutch: Municipal Theatre) of Amsterdam is a theatre building on the Leidseplein in Amsterdam, Netherlands. The building was built in 1894 in the neo-Renaissance style, and was the home of the National Ballet and Opera.

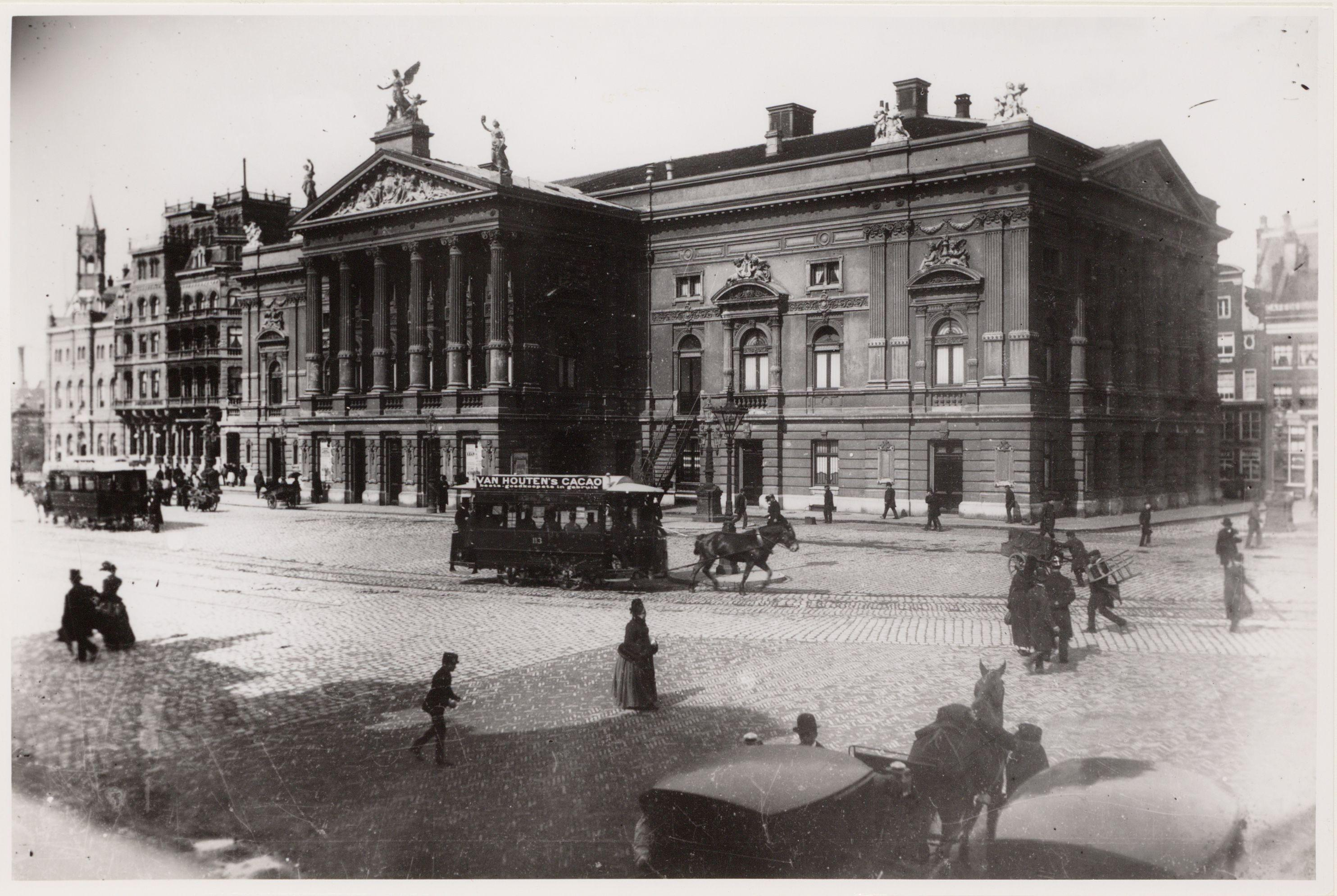
The original building in 1874

== History ==
=== Rederijkerskamers ===
The first rederijkers (Dutch orators) appeared at the end of the 15th century in Amsterdam. In the 16th century, these so-called precursors of modern theatre organized themselves into rederijkerskamers, which can be compared to theater companies. At that time, there were no permanent theater buildings in Amsterdam, and the shipping company cherries performed on temporary stages, from carts (during processions) or in public spaces. Rederijkerskamers that performed in Amsterdam were: "In Liefde Bloeyende" and "'t Wit Lavendel". The latter was also known as the "Brabantsche Kamer", since its members mainly hailed from Brabant and the Flemish areas.

=== Duytsche Academie ===
In 1617, the dramatists Samuel Coster and Gerbrand Adriaenszoon Bredero—along with their Rederijkerskamer "In Liefde Bloeyende"—founded the Duytsche Academy. This institution was formed after the example of Italian academies, to popularize science through lectures in the national language. The Academy was established in a wooden building at Keizersgracht in Amsterdam, on the site of the modern hotel Blakes.

=== First Schouwburg of Van Campen ===
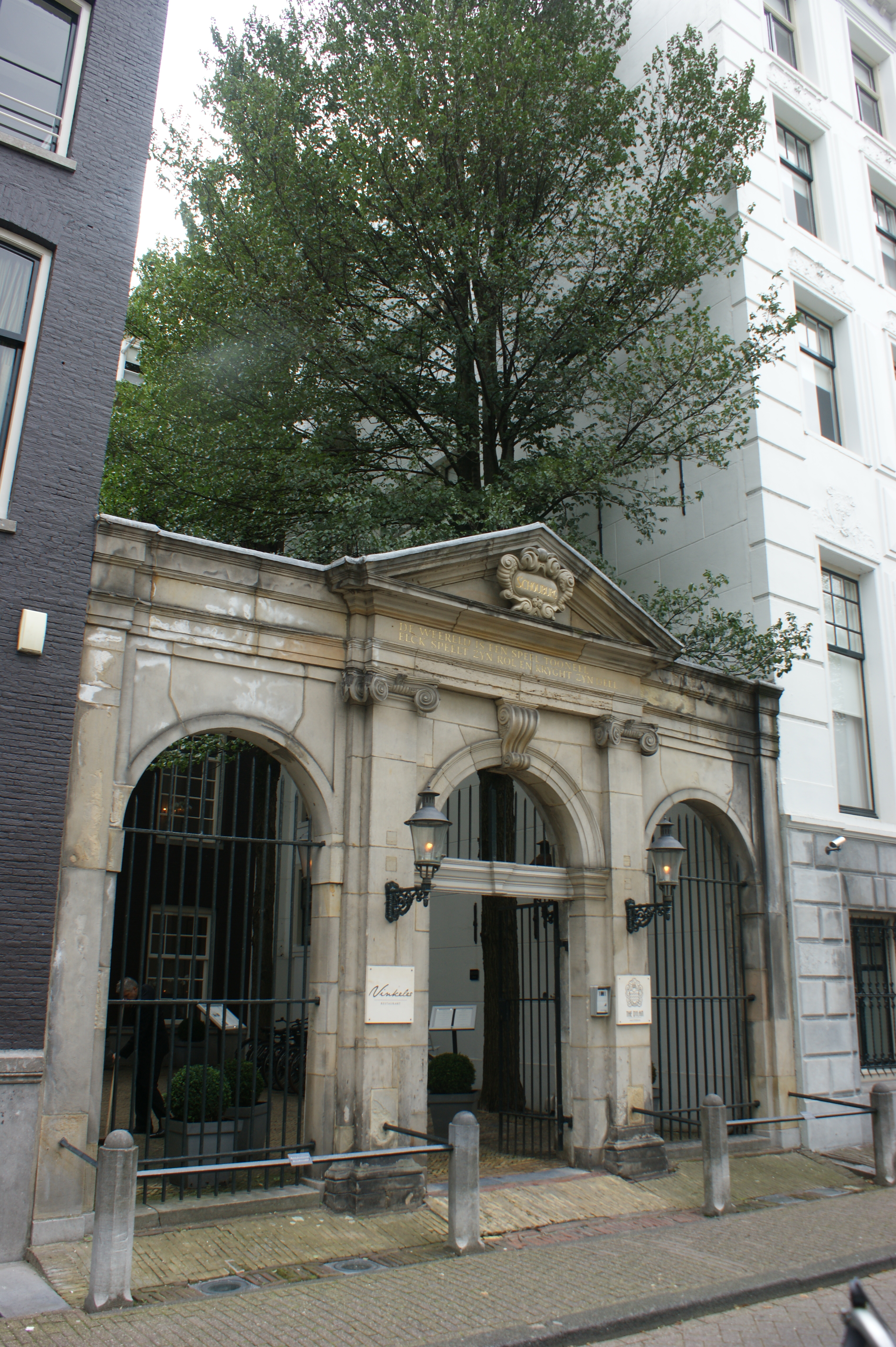
Keizersgracht 384, the old entrance gate to the theatre

The Schouwburg of Van Campen was a theatre located at Keizersgracht 384 in Amsterdam, Amsterdam's first city theatre. The site is now occupied by a hotel.

=== New Theater ===
In 1664 it was decided that the small theater of Van Campen had to be replaced by a larger theater building more in tune with the customs and Baroque architecture of the time. This new theater was twice as large as the old, and opened on 26 May 1665. Its first stone had been laid by the youngest daughter of the playwright Jan Vos.

The Amsterdam story writer Jan Wagenaar gives an ample description of this building, mentioning in particular the theatre machinery, through which men could fall through the air or disappear below the stage. Gerard de Lairesse helped decorate the interior.

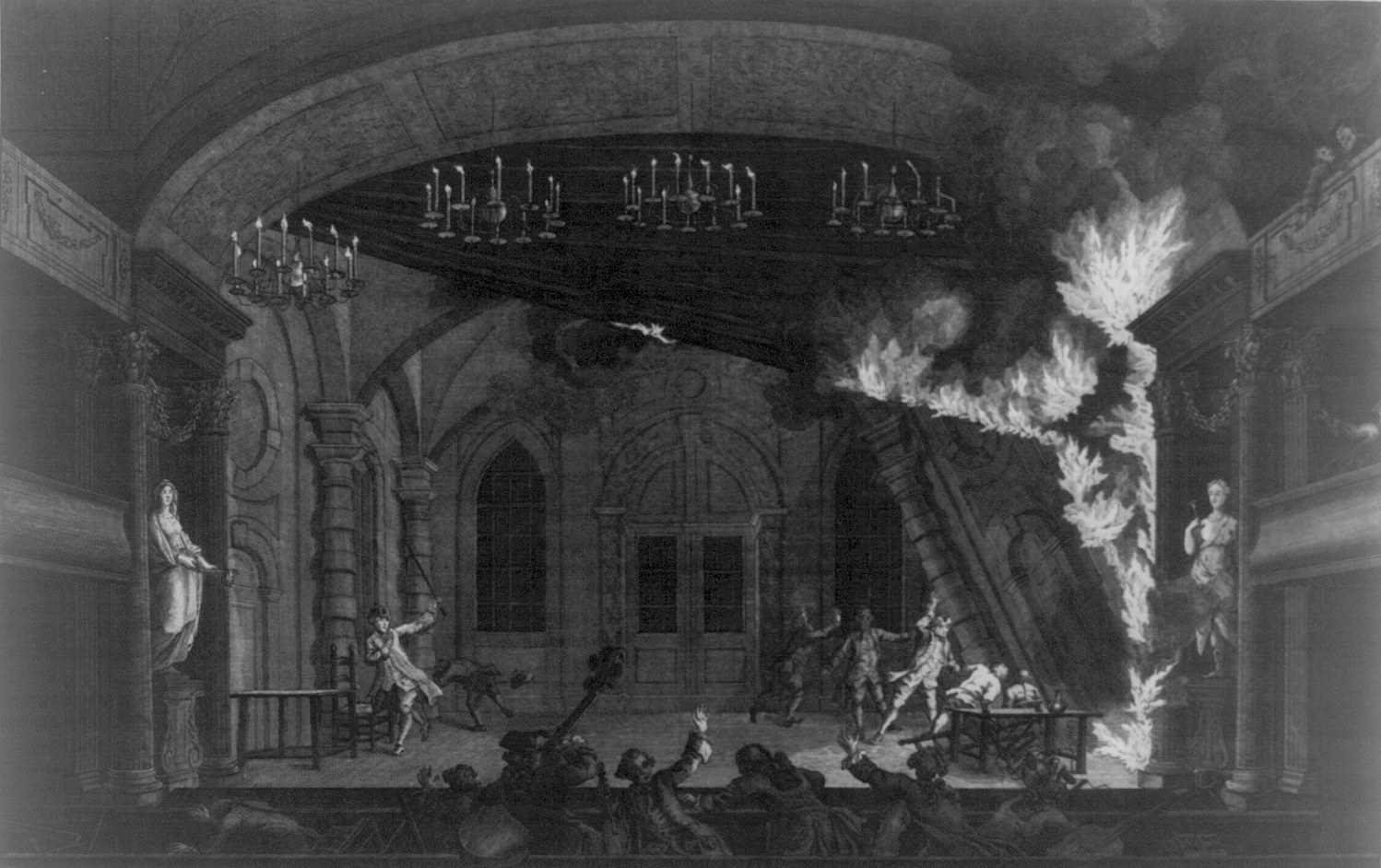
The new theater catches fire, 1772

This building was regularly extended and adapted but on 7 May 1772, caught fire during a performance, after a theatre servant had carelessly gone round the building with a naked candle from the stage lighting. The fire quickly burnt itself out, yet killed 18 people, destroyed 22 houses in the surroundings, and was so large that he it could be seen all the way from The Hague, Utrecht and on the island of Texel. The rubble became valuable due to the gold and the jewels in it, and the site was sold by its owners after the fire.

=== Leidseplein ===
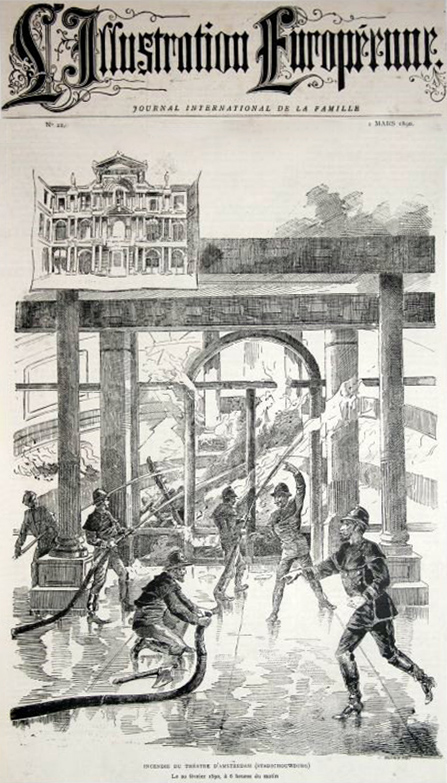
Firefighters at the burning Stadsschouwburg, February 1890 (from L'Illustration Européenne)

The city theatre moved to the Leidseplein and opened on 13 September 1789 with the première of Lucretia Wilhelmina van Merken's tragedy Jacob Simonszoon de Ryk. The building had a wooden structure behind a stone facade. It burned down in 1890.

The present theatre was built between 1892 and 1894 to a design of Jan L. Springer (1850–1915), with the cooperation of his father J. B. Springer and Adolf Leonard van Gendt. The rebuilding was supported by the prominent banker, philanthropist and senator A. C. Wertheim. In 1982 it became a Rijksmonument. From the end Second World War until the opening of the Stopera in 1986, the Dutch National Opera was based in the Stadsschouwburg.

== Culture and theatre ==
Whenever AFC Ajax has a major win, they often go to the steps of the cities theater to be publicly applauded. The normal programme of events encompasses all sorts of theatrical forms, mostly by Dutch writers.

The Boekenbal (book ball) is traditionally held in the Stadsschouwburg and it marks the beginning of the annual Boekenweek (book week).

== Bibliography ==
- Worp, J.A.: Geschiedenis van den Amsterdamschen Schouwburg 1496-1772. Amsterdam: S.L. van Looy, 1920.

== See also ==
- Polly Cuninghame - Maria Gartman - Johanna Wattier
