= Adriaan van Hees =

Dutch actor (1910–1976)

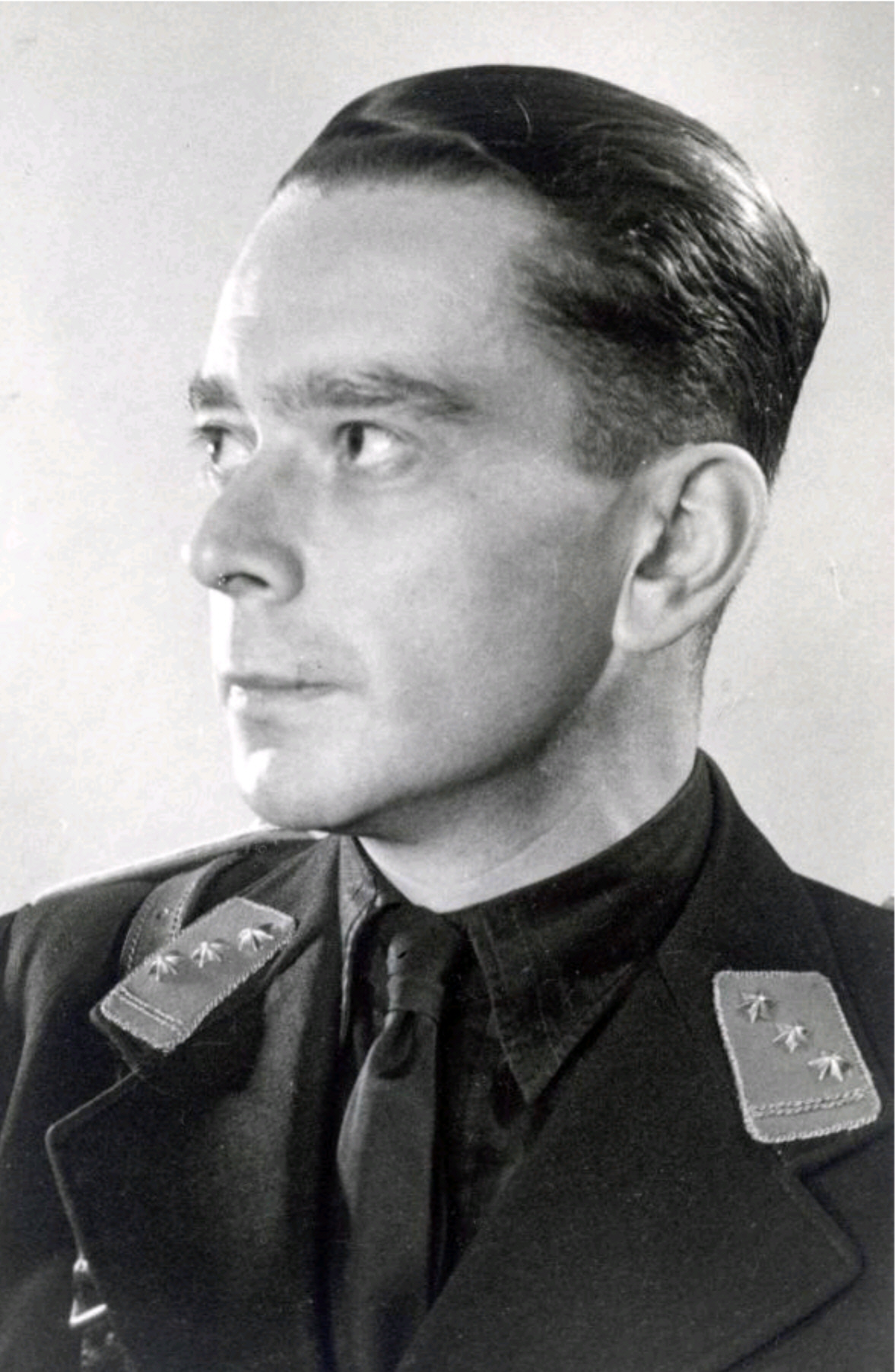
Adriaan van Hees in NSB uniform, c. 1942

Adriaan Nicolaas Johan van Hees (3 May 1910 – 2 December 1976) was a Dutch actor and member of the National Socialist Movement in the Netherlands (NSB). Van Hees was trained in Amsterdam and Germany, and spent a few years in theater and film. He quit professional acting to join the NSB, giving speeches and overseeing the organization's theater division, arguing that the change he thought necessary in Dutch drama had to come from political revolution. He became depressed and suicidal when he discovered he was part Jewish; still, he tried to join the SS but was denied. After the war, he was banned from the stage for ten years, and sentenced to five years in prison.

== Biography ==
=== Early career ===
Van Hees was born in Rotterdam, the son of a theater director from Haarlem. He attended the Theaterschool in Amsterdam from 1927 to 1929, but left for Germany, claiming the quality of education was inferior in Amsterdam. In Germany, he attended drama schools in Düsseldorf and Berlin. From 1931 to 1934 he worked under Cor van der Lugt Melsert with the Vereenigd Rotterdamsch-Hofstad Tooneel, a company that also featured Piet Rienks and Annie van Duyn. After an argument with van der Lugt, he left for Berlin again in March 1933. When he returned in May 1933 he joined the National Socialist Movement in the Netherlands (NSB), and argued that the drastic improvement necessary in Dutch theater could only come about after a revolutionary change in Dutch politics and society.

In July 1933 van Hees toured the Dutch West Indies with the company De Dietsche Spelers and from 1933 to 1935 he performed in various plays, but he quit the theater in 1935 to focus exclusively on his party work for the NSB. He suffered from severe depression when he found out, in 1934, that his grandfather on his mother's side was Jewish, making him one quarter Jewish under the Nuremberg Laws. He felt he suffered from a split personality, being so fully convinced of the racial politics of which he himself was the intended victim. He contemplated suicide to escape what he called "the conflict of the bastard", but after the war the judge who presided over his case sneered that this was nothing but "third-rate theatrics".

He performed in a few pre-war movies, and participated in theatrical events organized by radio stations. For the NSB paper Het Nationale Dagblad he wrote theater reviews in which he connected theater with national-socialism. In 1937–1938 he did a fourteen-month tour of the Dutch East Indies with Cor Ruys's company.

=== Wartime ===
In early 1940 van Hees returned to the Netherlands. He was appointed leader of the film department of the Nationale Werknemers Vereniging, later called Nederlands Arbeidsfront, a national-socialist union. He was one of the speakers at the NSB party meeting in Lunteren on 22 June 1940, at the Muur van Mussert, where he called for vengeance for the death of eight NSB members who had been executed by Dutch soldiers during the German invasion of May 1940. With the rank of opperhopman, van Hees led the singing school of the Weerbaarheidsafdeling (WA), and he functioned as theater advisor to the NSB leadership, writing a book, Nieuw tooneel voor een nieuw publiek ("New drama for a new audience"). On 11 July 1941 he married the youngest daughter of Barthold Arnold van der Sluijs, an NSB member who later became mayor of Zaandam and then Alkmaar, and they had a son the next year. In July 1942 he began working for the Nederlandsche Omroep, the Dutch media outlet installed by the occupying Germans in 1940 on the model of the Reichs-Rundfunk-Gesellschaft. One of his radio programs was a course in elocution.

Despite his non-Aryan background he volunteered in August 1942 for the Waffen-SS unit Germania. He did not pass the inspection. In 1944 van Hees wanted to join the Nederlandse Landwacht, a paramilitary organization founded by the Germans. On the recommendation of Hanns Albin Rauter, SS and police leader in the Netherlands, he asked Anton Mussert to designate him an "honorary Aryan". This did not happen, and van Hees played no further role of importance in the NSB. He was no longer asked to speak publicly, and his isolation increased after he was fired from the Nederlandsche Omroep. He went into hiding after Dolle Dinsdag, when rumors of liberation by the Allies spread.

== After the war ==
In March 1945 Adolphe Engers mentioned van Hees as one of four people who should be removed from Dutch theater. By August he had been banned from the stage for ten years.

Van Hees had intended to leave Europe if the Germans won the war. He was sentenced in 1949 to five years in prison; the prosecutor had asked for six years. In his defense he said he joined the NSB to "exorcise a demon". He died in Vlissingen in 1976.

== Filmography ==
- Malle Gevallen (1934) as Piet Janssen (the Klit)
- Het leven is niet zo kwaad (1935) as Heer Bergman
- Jonge harten (1936) as Hans
- Zomerzotheid (1936, based on a Cissy van Marxveldt book) as Gerrit-Jan (final film role)
