= Jacob Merkelbach =

Dutch photographer (1877–1942)

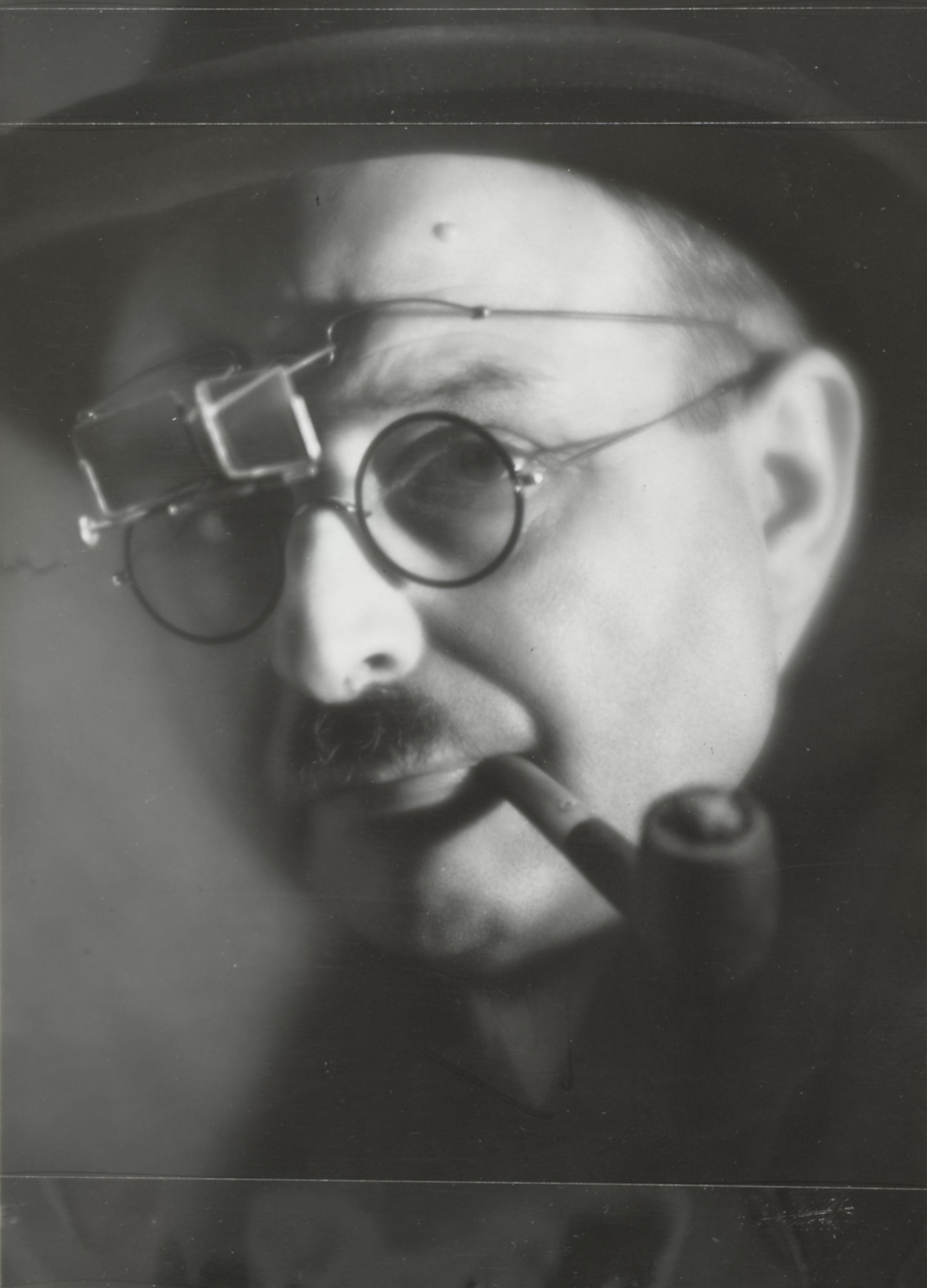
- 1920 self=portrait
- Born: Jacobus Merkelbach; 29 April 1877; Amsterdam, Netherlands
- Died: 6 February 1942 (aged 64); Amsterdam, Netherlands
- Occupation: Photographer
- Children: Maria Antonia Merkelbach (daughter)

Jacobus (Jacob) Merkelbach (Amsterdam, 29 April 1877 – Amsterdam, 6 February 1942) was a Dutch photographer, specializing in portraiture.

The Rijksmuseum in Amsterdam, Netherlands, holds a permanent collection of some 208 of his photographs, available for both viewing and scientific research. Such research revealed that for some 28 of them he had used the now long-defunct Jos-Pe dye imbibition process, a technique common in early commercial photography.

His daughter, Maria Antonia Merkelbach, was also a photographer.

== Gallery ==
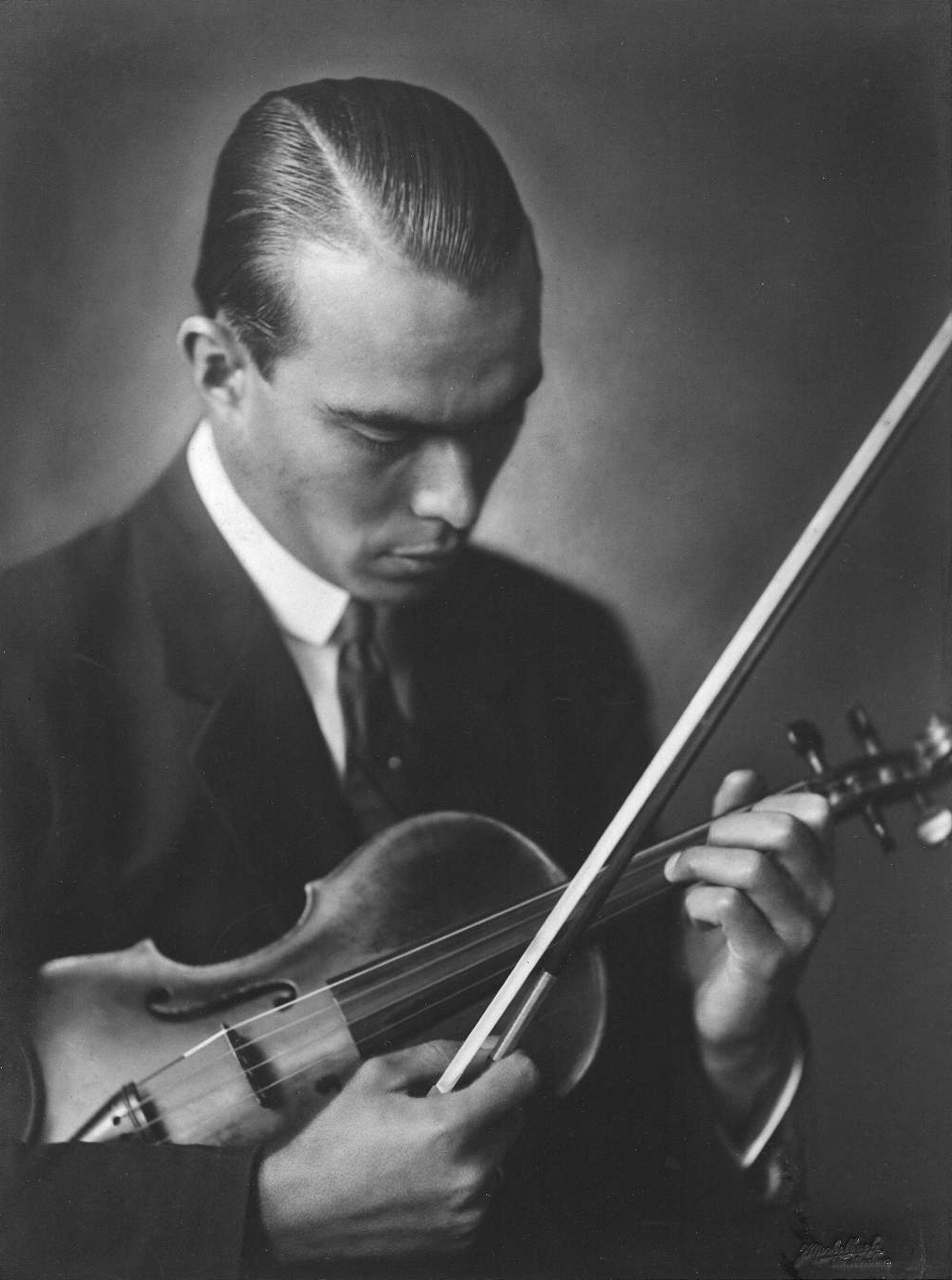
Francis Koene

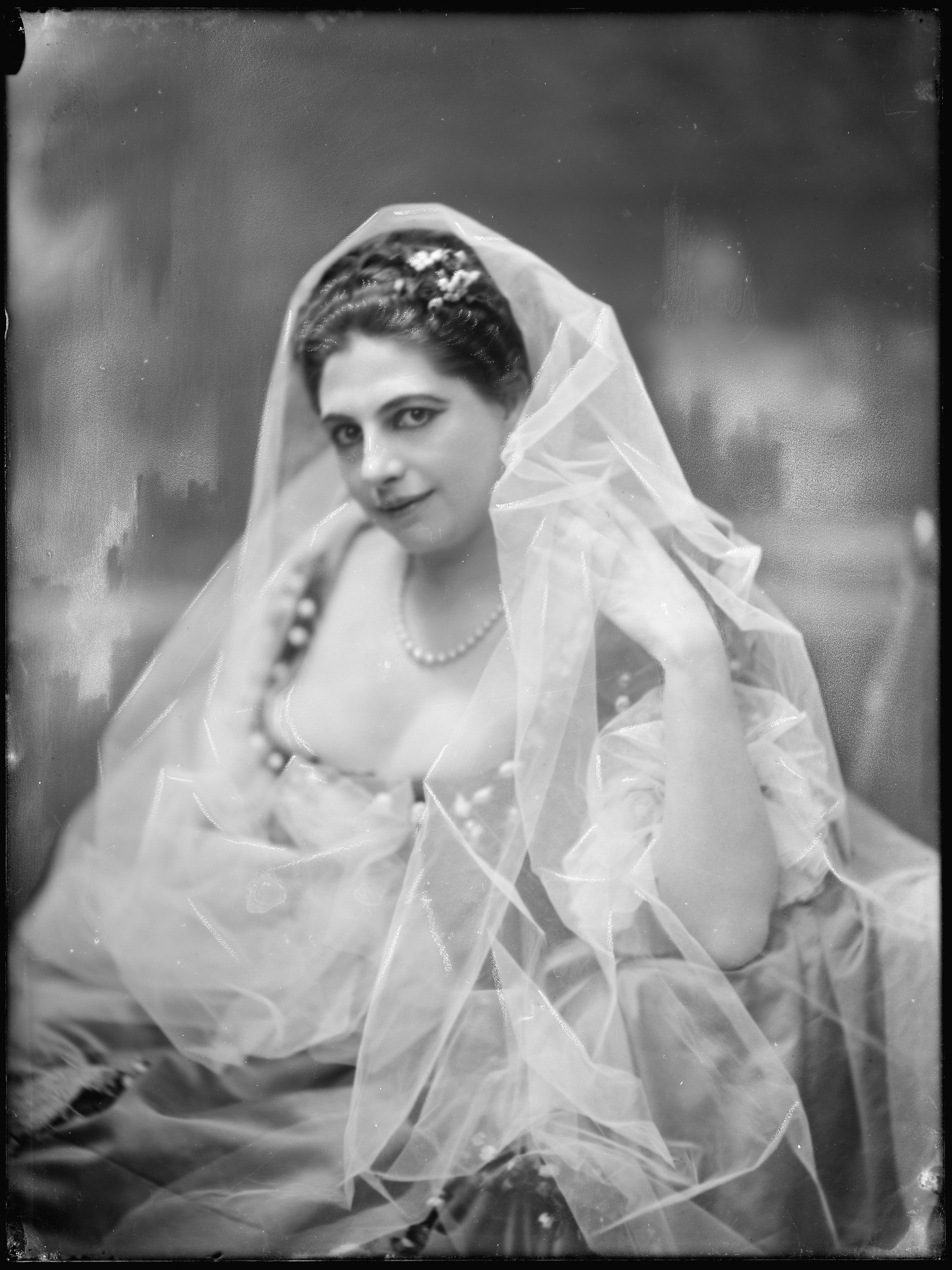
Mata Hari

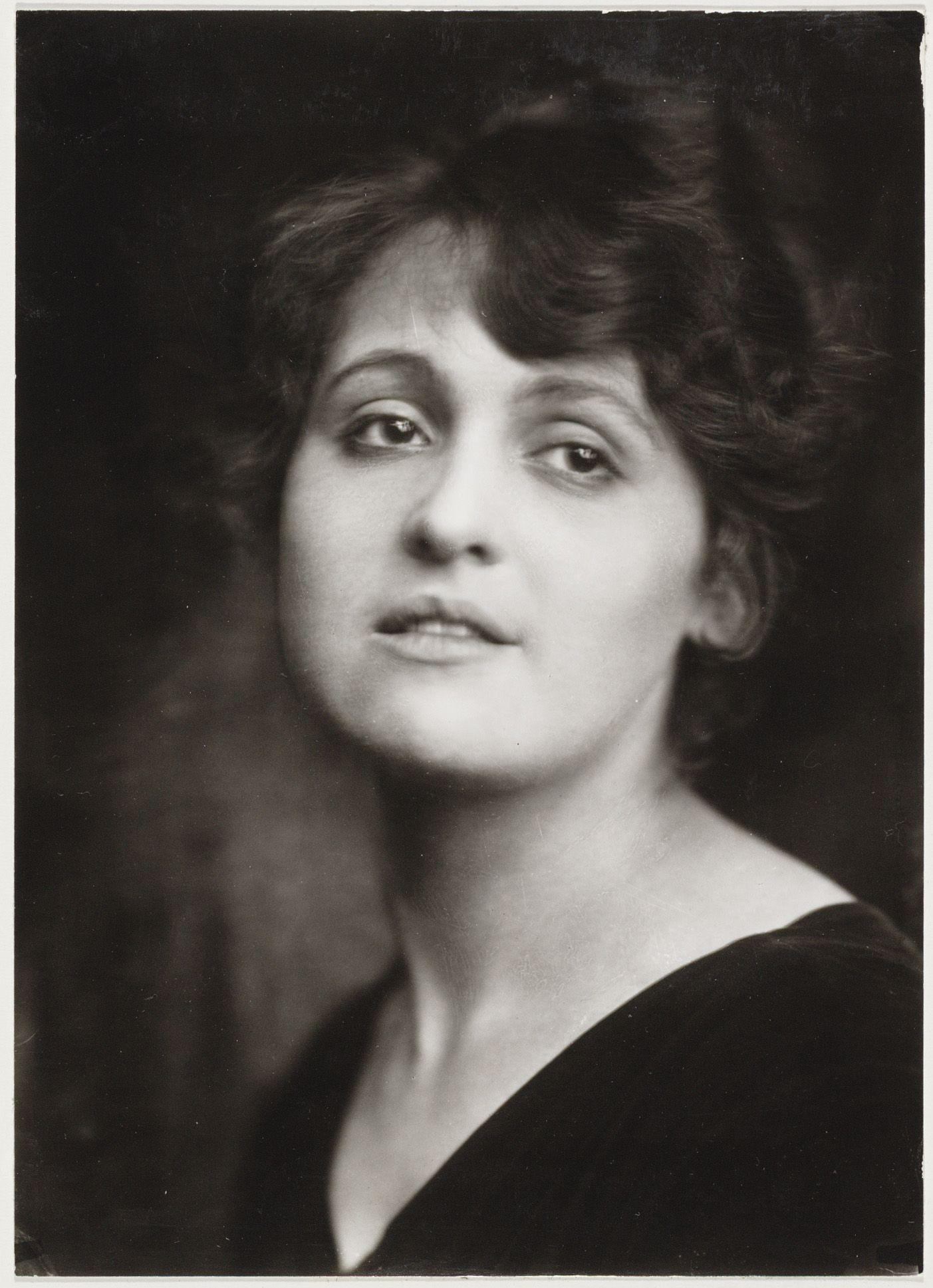
Nola Hatterman

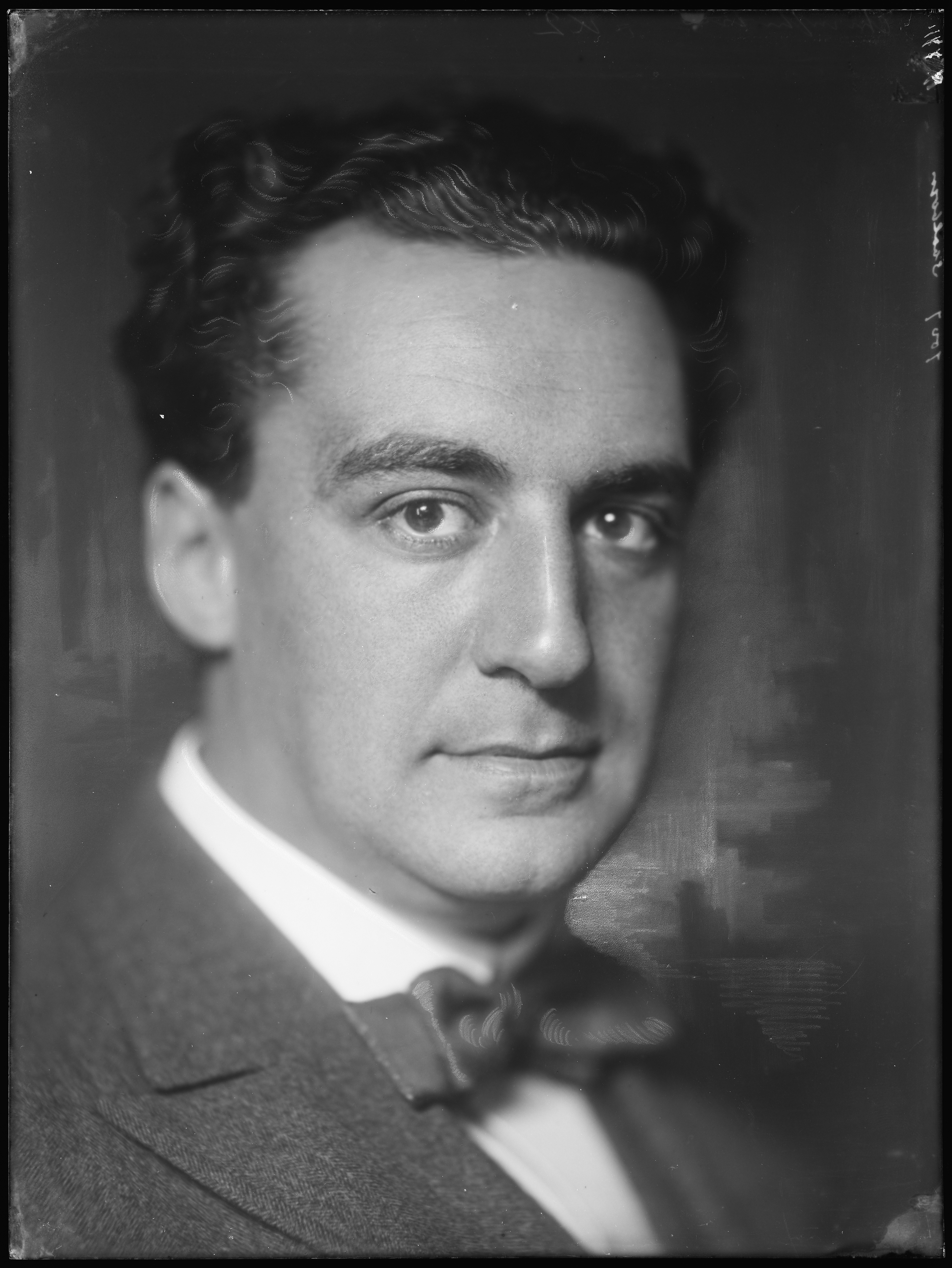
Louis Saalborn

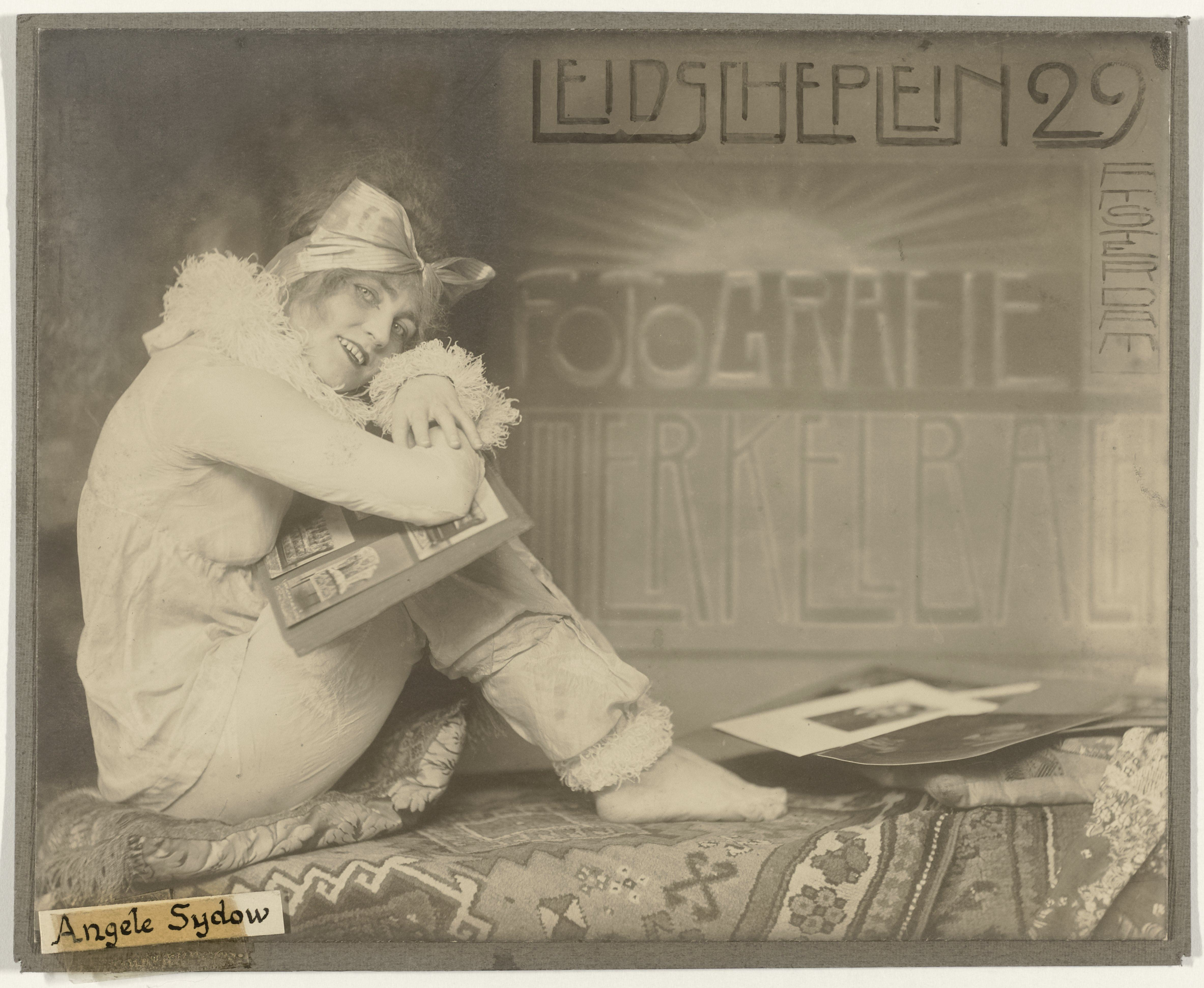
Angèle Sydow

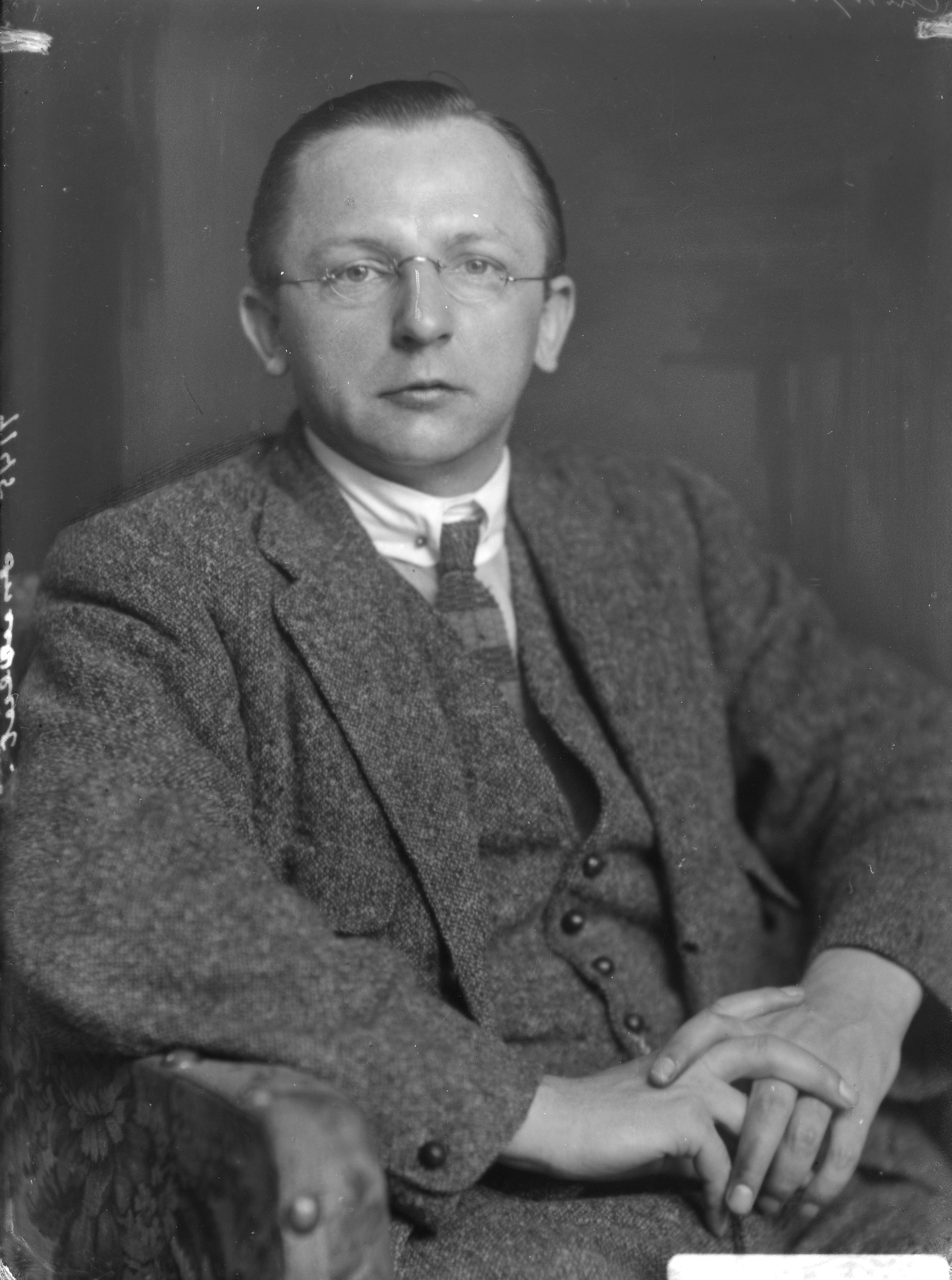
Henk Sneevliet

== See also ==
- List of Dutch artists
- List of people from Amsterdam
- List of photographers
