= Het Mysterie van de Mondscheinsonate =

- Directed by: Kurt Gerron
- Written by: Willy Corsari (novel), Walter Schlee (scenario)
- Release date: 7 November 1935
- Running time: 91 minutes
- Country: Netherlands
- Language: Dutch

Het Mysterie van de Mondscheinsonate is a 1935 Dutch mystery film directed by Kurt Gerron.

== Cast ==
- Louis De Bree ... Inspecteur Lund
- Louis Saalborn... Enrica's man
- Wiesje Van Tuinen ... Enrica
- Ank van der Moer ... Vrouw van taxichauffeur
- Enny Meunier ... Lucie Maerlant
- Annie Verhulst ... Katharina
- Darja Collin ... Yva, Sascha's partner
- Bill Benders ... Taxichauffeur
- Raoul de Bock ... Zoontje taxichauffeur
- Charles Braakensiek
- Claire Claery ... Duits dienstmeisje
- Paula de Waart
- Harry Dresselhuys ... Verloofde van Lucie
- Bart Elferink
- Ludzer Eringa
- Egon Karter ... Sascha Darinoff
- Frans Meermans
- Wim Paauw ... Joost Maerlant
- Johan Schilthuyzen
