= Een Zomerzotheid =

- Directed by: Hans van Meerten
- Written by: Walter Schlee (writer), Cissy van Marxveldt (novel)
- Release date: 1936
- Country: Netherlands
- Language: Dutch

Een Zomerzotheid is a 1936 Dutch film directed by Hans van Meerten.

== Cast ==
- Henry Berg
- Leo de Hartogh
- Pam Ingenegeren
- Jenny Moerdijk
- Elly Sternheim
- Theo Valck-Lucassen
- Adriaan Van Hees
