= Maria Antonia Merkelbach =

Dutch photographer (1904–1985)

Mies Merkelbach
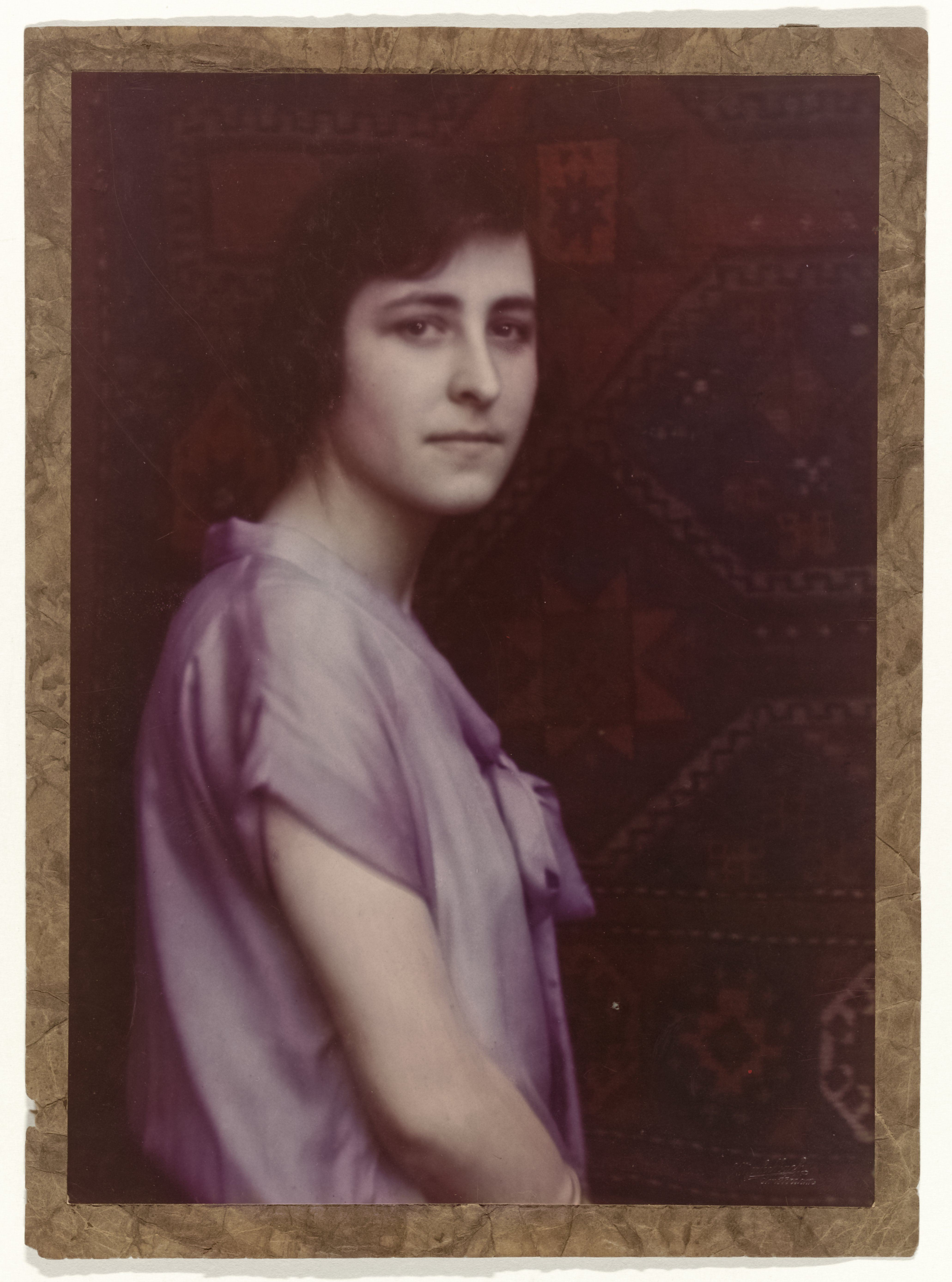
- Born: Maria Antonia Merkelbach; 21 April 1904; Amsterdam
- Died: 2 April 1985 (aged 80); Amsterdam
- Occupation: Portrait photography

Maria Antonia (Mies) Merkelbach (1904–1985) was a professional photographer, designer, and painter. In photography she followed her father, Jacob Merkelbach, a famous fashion photographer in Amsterdam, by working in his well-known studio called "Atelier J. Merkelbach" that he established in April 1913. She also worked for the studio as a high-fashion clothing model. She directed the studio after her father's death in 1942 until 1969. She and her husband took many portrait pictures of Queen Wilhelmina out of which one portrait was chosen as a state photograph.

== Biography ==
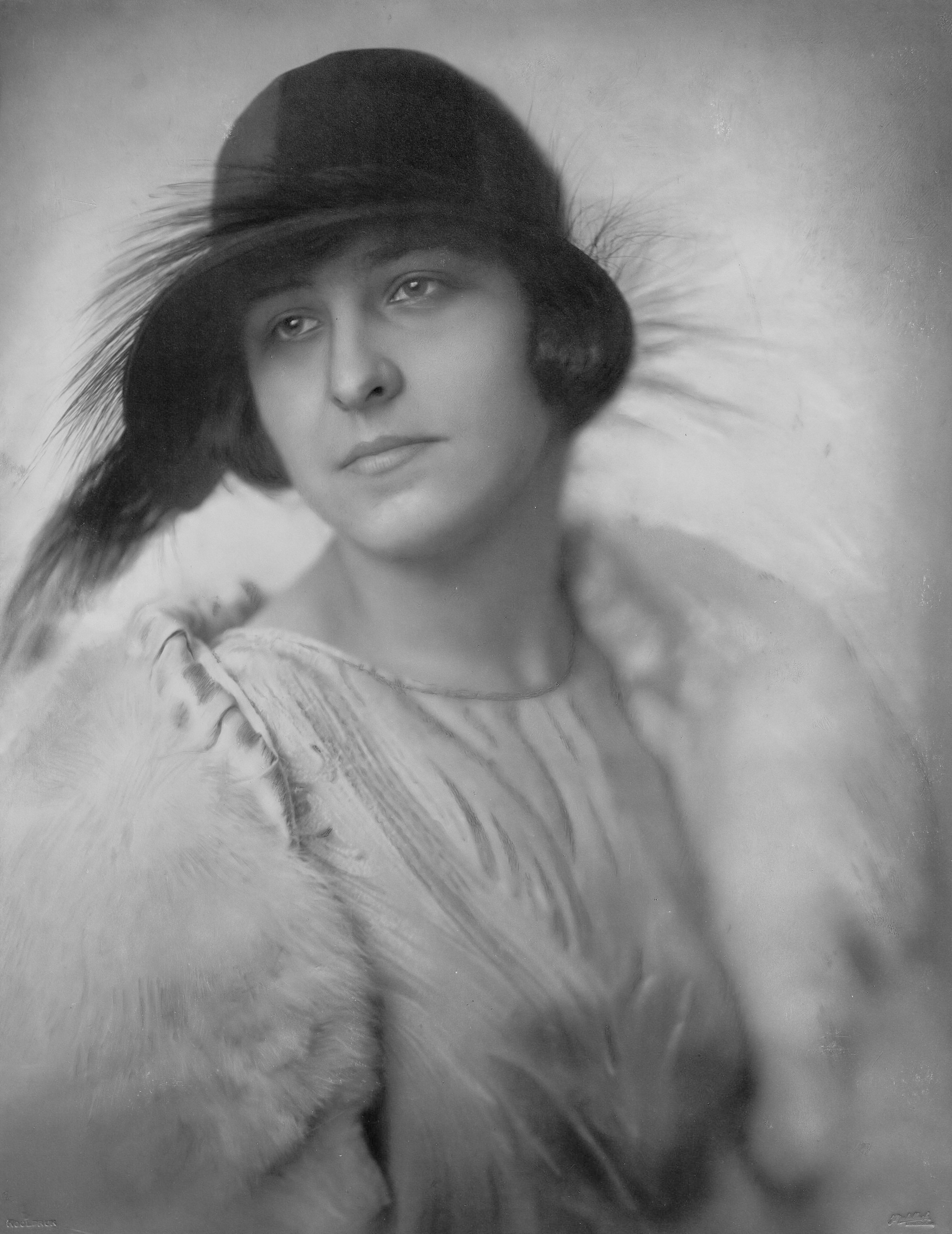
Portrait of Mies by Jacob Merkelbach (1924)

Maria Antonia Merkelbach (aka: Mies), also known as Mies Merkelbach or Mies Rosenboom-Merkelbach, was born in 1904 at Amsterdam. Her father was Jacobus Merkelbach (1877–1942), a photographer, and her mother was Josephine Maria Wilhelmina Harmsen (1881–1969); she was the eldest daughter among their four children. Her father, a well-known fashion photographer of portraits, had established his "Atelier J. Merkelbach" in 1913, above the fashion house Hirsch & Cie on the Leidseplein where she started working after her education and training in photography. After secondary school education, she attended the Dagteken- Art and Craft School for Girls, Amsterdam where she was tutored in drawings, which helped her later in her profession in retouching of photographs. After the learning process, she joined her father's firm in 1924, and initially started work of developing the negatives, enlargements, printing, and retouching of photographs. On 11 May 1939, she married Bobby Rosenboom who had been working in her father's studio since 1932 as a photographer; he had brought about innovations in the studio by adopting artificial light, and taking pictures for commercial advertising. They started living at the Van Baerlestraat.

Her work with her father on a regular basis resulted in large portrait photography in Vienna and Berlin-style Atelier Merkelbach, which expanded their customer base which consisted of theater artists, authors, commissioners, politicians, businessmen and rich people of Amsterdam. Dressed in extravagantly fashionable clothes she also modeled for photographs for her studio; some of her pictures were her "wearing luxurious fur, a beautiful blue raincoat, a glamorous evening dress, and various fashionable hats." These pictures from 1924, including her sister Jo's, were displayed in the show windows of the Hirsch fashion house, which enhanced the reputation of the studio as well as the fashion house. Her father who took these pictures liked them very much. A particular portrait which he liked was of Mies wearing a hat dressed in light colored evening gown with a wrap around made of fur, which he printed in many forms and formats including a carbon print of 40x 50 cm size. He entered this photo in an exhibition in 1925 in a salon in Bandung, the city then under the Dutch East Indies.

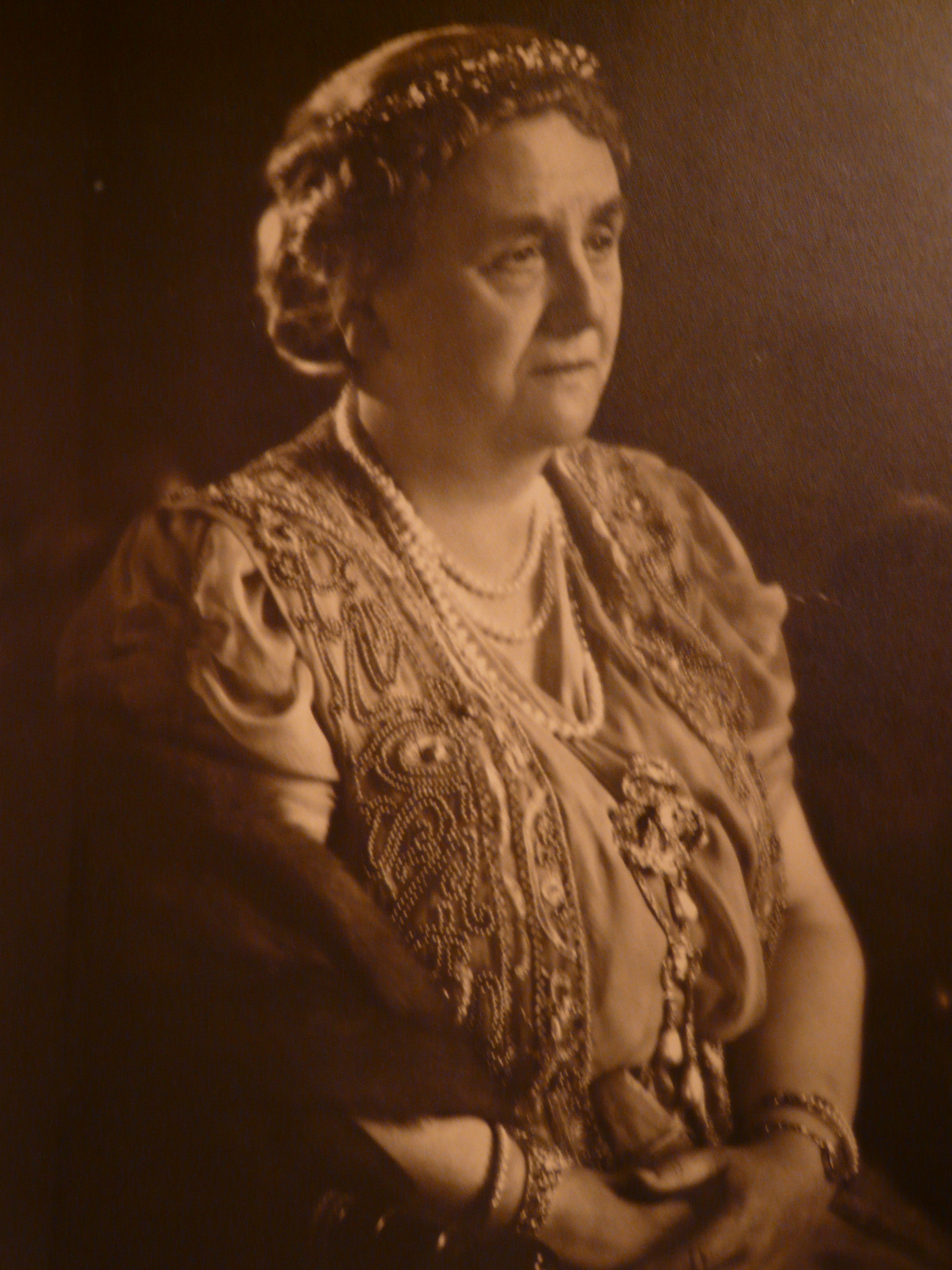
State Portrait of Queen Wilhelmina taken in 1948 in the Studio J. Merkelbach

The Atelier Merkelbach continued to function during the World War II even though the fashion house Hirsch on the ground floor had ceased to function; during this period; her studio even had an anti-aircraft gun on its roof. However, her husband Rosenboom was incarcerated on charges of espionage by the Germans, in the Landsberg am Lech prison for two years from 1941 to 1943. During this period for the first time she started operating the cameras and also started managing the studio. There was tragedy as her father died in 1942 leaving a large debt. She then took charge of the studio and worked vigorously by taking portrait photographs of well-known families, apart from photographs of officers and staff of the occupation forces. She even took pictures for issuing false passports, which put her in a state of tension and fear of being caught as the German soldiers used to frequent her studios.

After the war, she continued to manage the studio while her husband was engaged in reconstructing the Cinetone Studios which had been damaged during the war. But in 1948, she and her husband came together to take portrait pictures of Queen Wilhelmina; one of these pictures was selected as the official state portrait. Apart from these photographs she also modeled for fashion photos, from the 1920s, for several advertising agencies such as the Delana fashion stores in Amsterdam, and the Reggers, Amsterdam goldsmith; for the latter she posed wearing jewelry.

On 29 April 1969, which was the birth anniversary of her father, she closed her establishment as the market for her type of work had dropped as result of the market getting flooded with handheld instant cameras. She then sold her studio's large glass negatives to the Theatre Museum, the Print Room of Leiden University, and to the Deutsches Museum. She also transferred 150,000 glass negatives to the City of Amsterdam. She then diversified her interest to work on paintings as an expressionist and making oil portraits. She also started doll making. Her husband died in 1978.

She died on 2 April 1985 in Amsterdam. She was childless.

== Some photographs by Mies Merkelbach ==
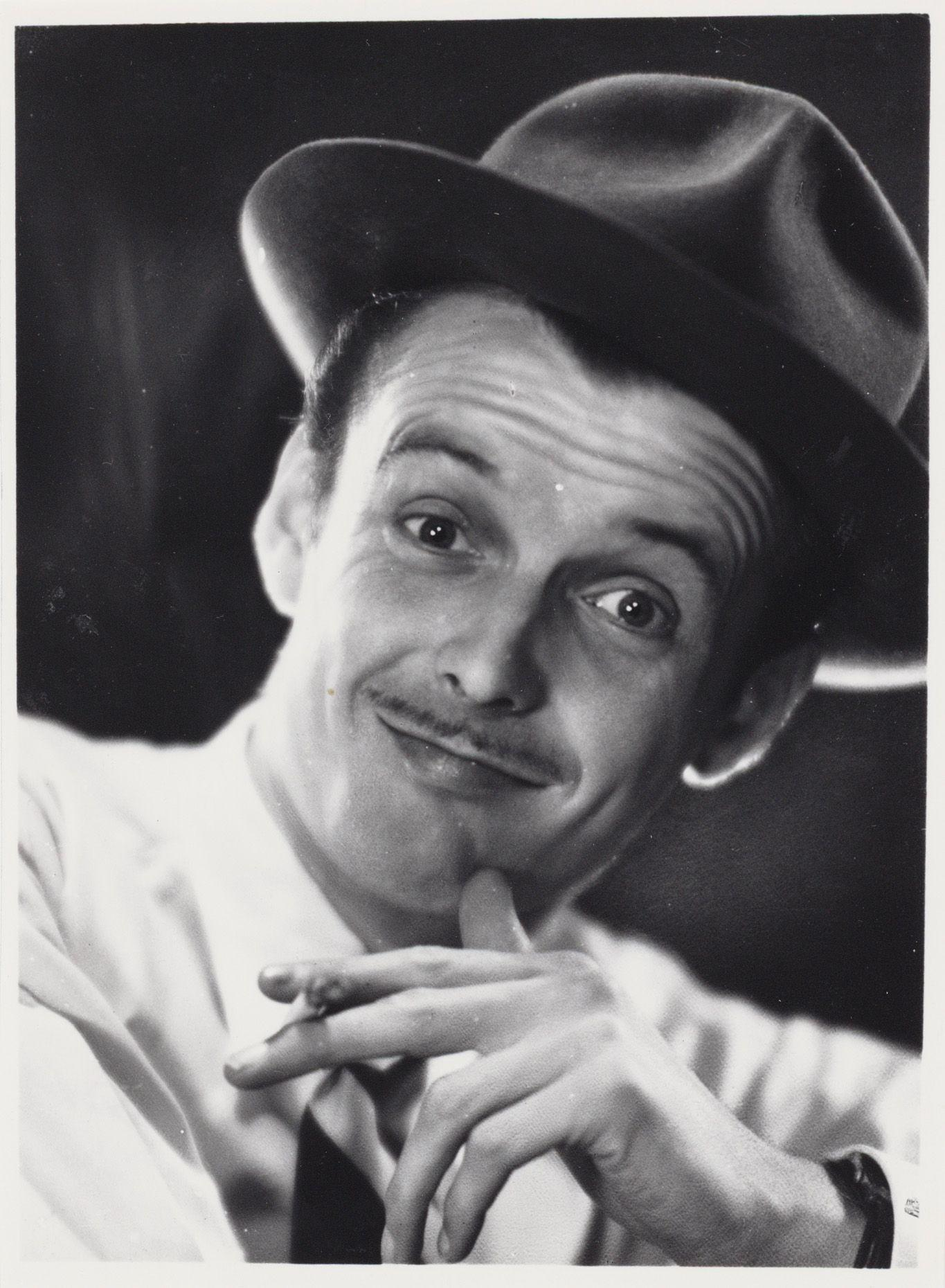
Toon Hermans (1947)

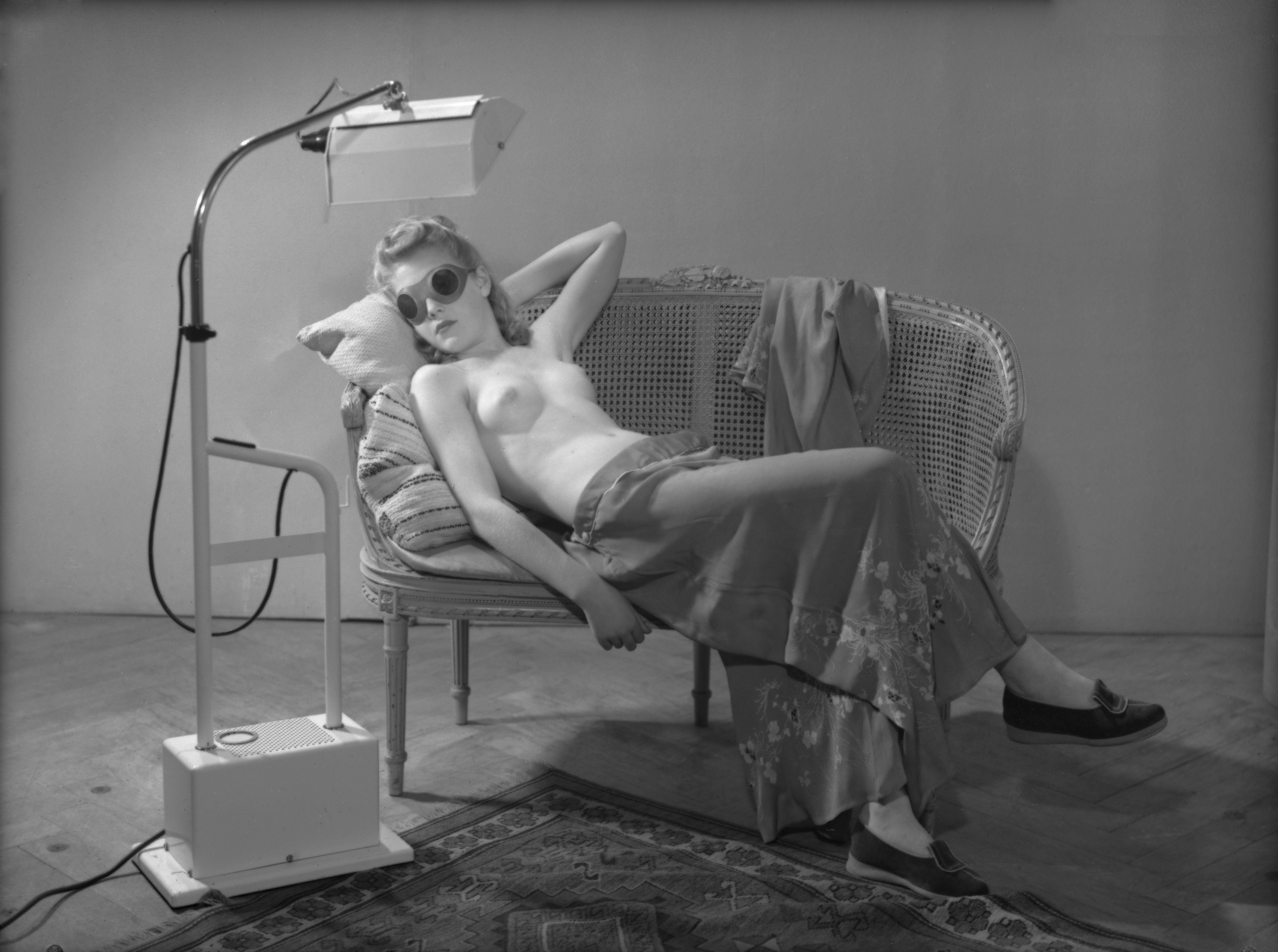
Philips tanning lamp advertisement (1946)

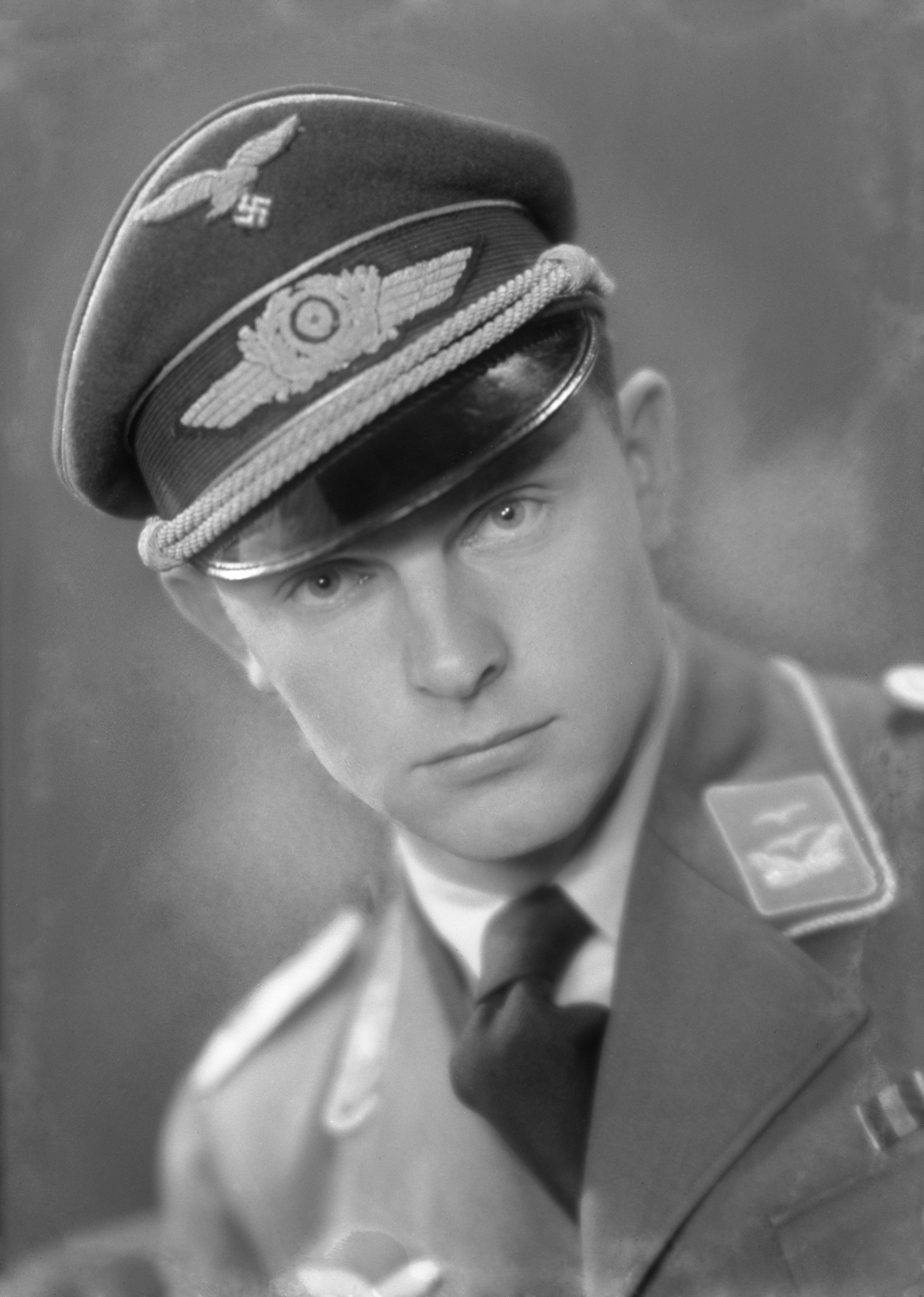
Luftwaffe Oberleutnant Hahn (1942)

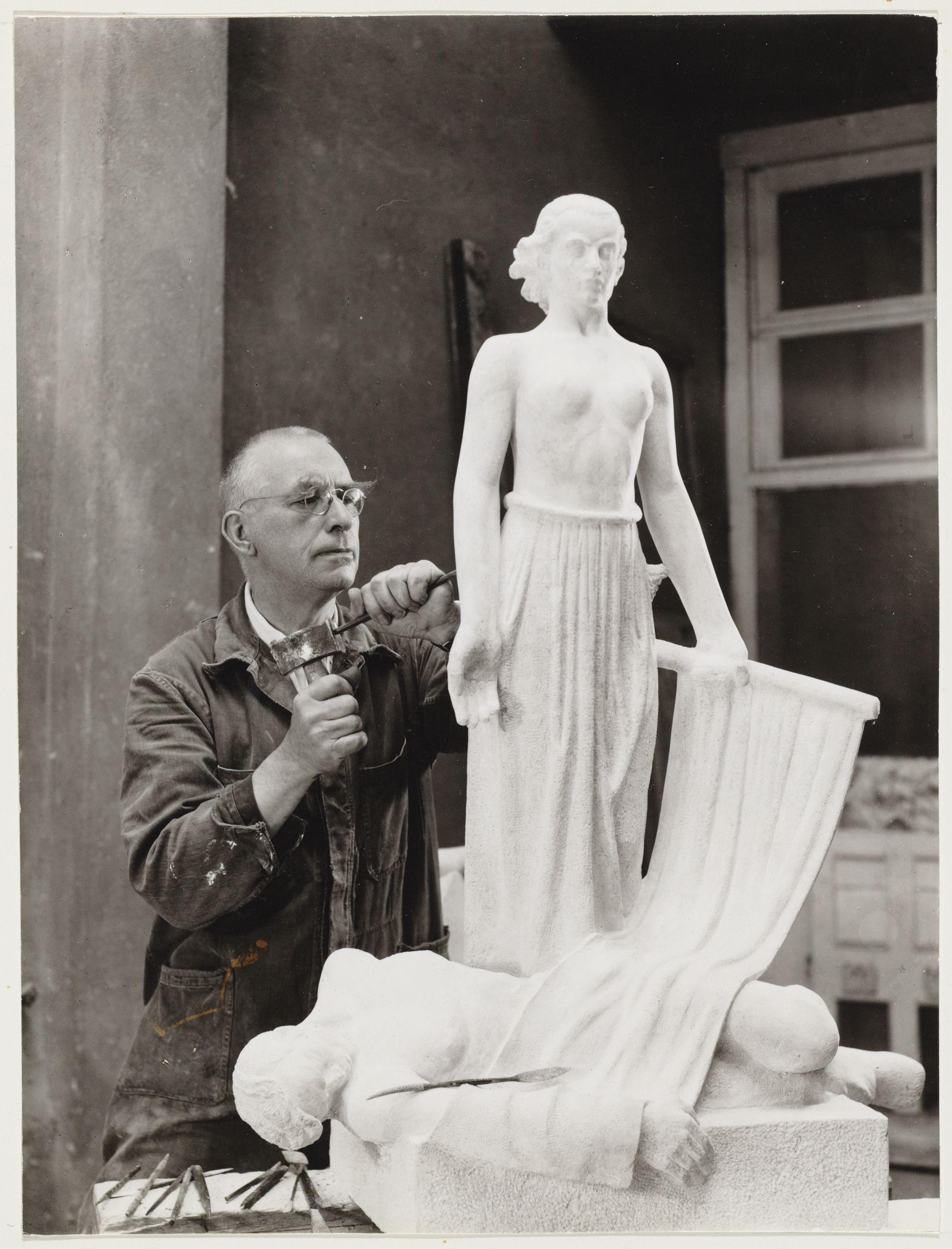
Hildo Krop (1947)

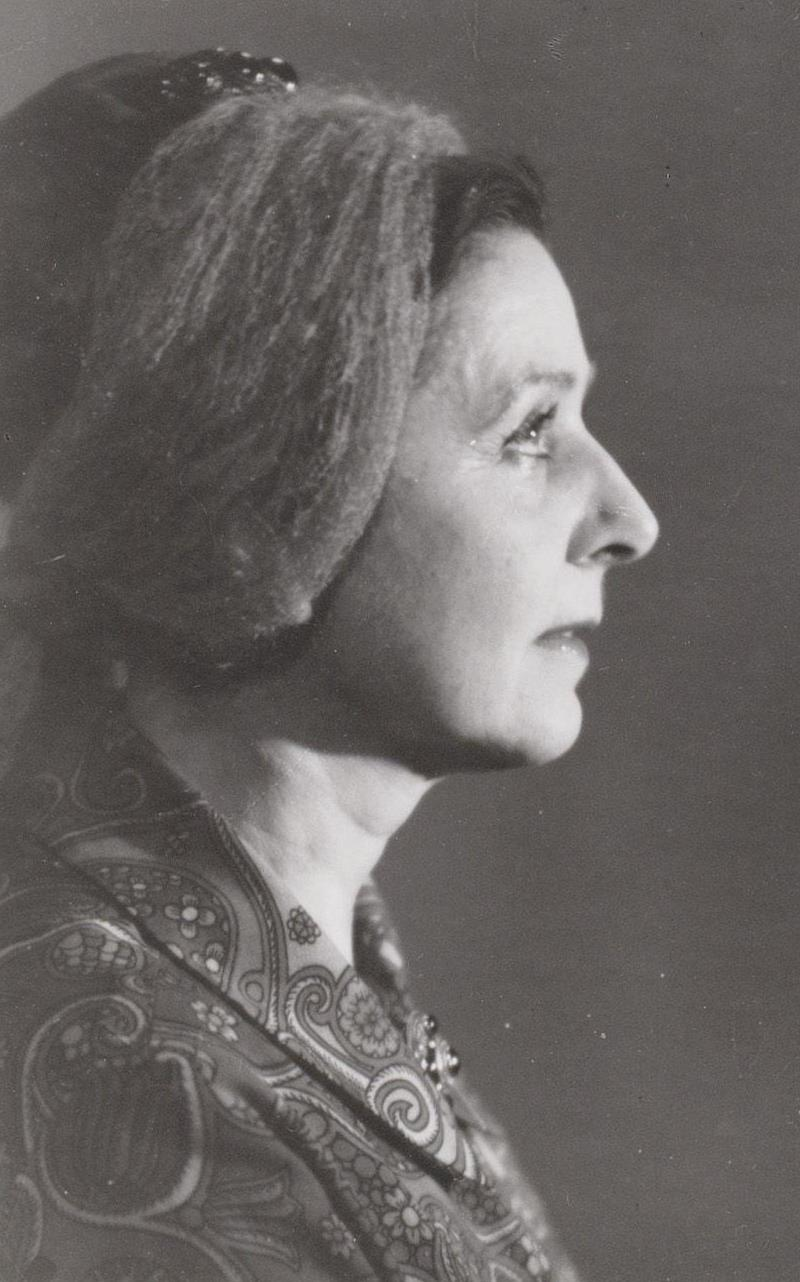
Cissy van Bennekom (1967)
