= Academy of Theatre and Dance =

Division of Amsterdam University of the Arts

Coordinates: 52°22′10″N 4°54′6″E

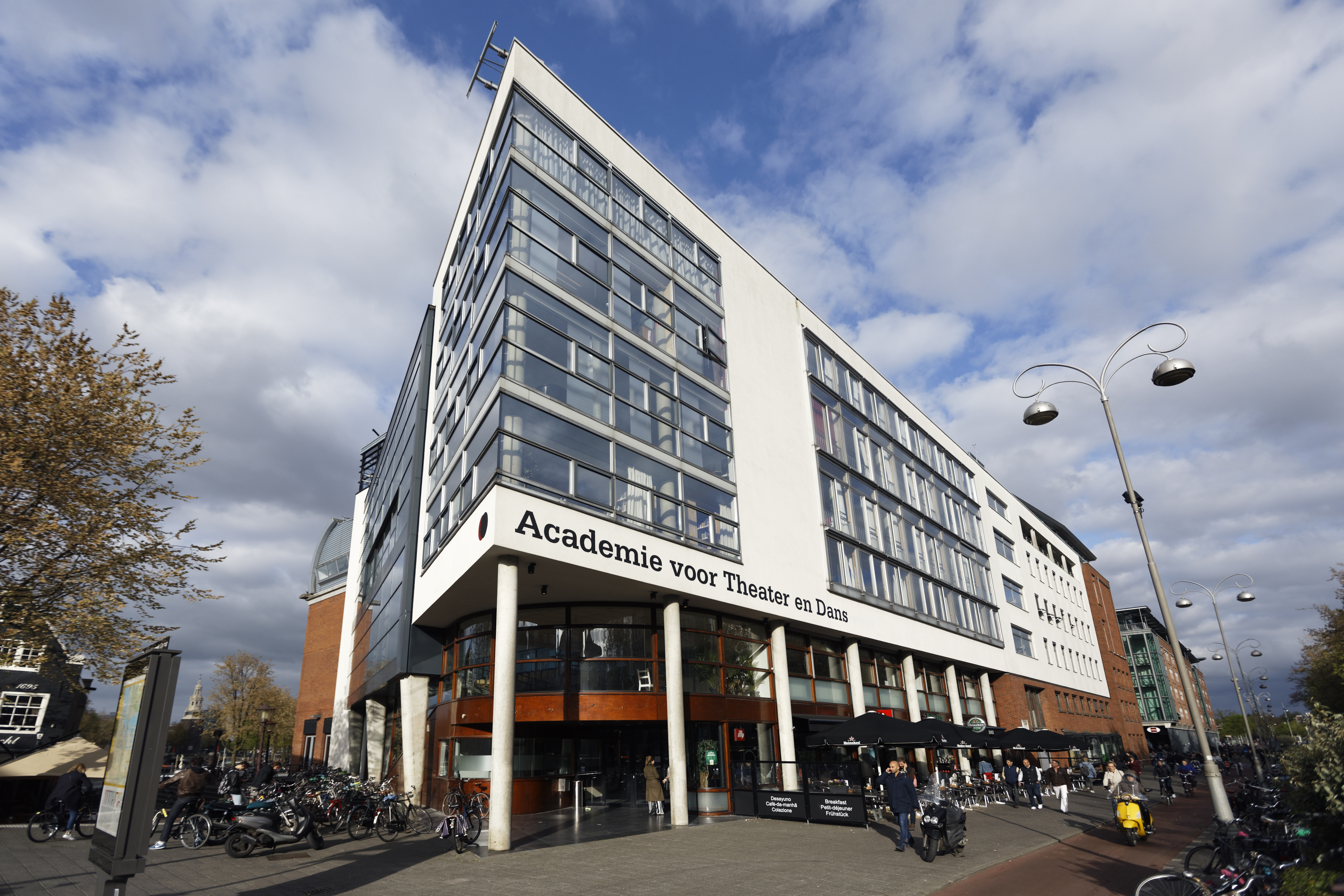
Academy of Theatre and Dance

The Academy of Theatre and Dance is a faculty of the Amsterdam University of the Arts which was known as de Theaterschool until September 2016. It runs four year Bachelor's degree courses in theatre and dance, and two year Master's degree courses offered by DAS Graduate School. The staff of instructors and guest instructors amounts to about sixty persons, nearly all also in active in the theatrical and dance field.

== History ==
The Amsterdamse Toneelschool was set up in 1874 and was at first established in the Marnixstraat 150. There Anna Sablariolles was registered as first pupil, and Maria Gartman as one of its first instructors. In 2001 it merged with the Kleinkunstacademie, founded in 1960 by Boris Blom

== Alumni ==
- Joop Admiraal
- Karin Bloemen
- Gijs Blom
- Acda en de Munnik
- Javier Guzman
- Rutger Hauer
- Katja Herbers
- Jeroen Krabbé
- Petra Laseur
- Willem Nijholt
- Ank van der Moer
- Josine van Dalsum
- Adriaan van Hees
- Carice van Houten
- Kasper van Kooten
- Martine Sandifort
- Henk van Ulsen
- Ramses Shaffy
- Aart Staartjes
- Stephen West
- Thijs Römer
- Rutger de Bekker, Diederik Ebbinge and Remko Vrijdag (better known as De Vliegende Panters)
- Youp van 't Hek (expelled during his introductory period)
