= Walter Schlee =

German screenwriter

- Occupation: Screenwriter
- Years active: 1925-1936 (film)

Walter Schlee (15 December 1894, Kępno - 5 February 1964, Lugano) was a German screenwriter. The Jewish Schlee left German following the Nazi Party's takeover of 1933. He then worked in the Netherlands along with other exiles such as Max Ophuls.

== Selected filmography ==
- Furnished Room (1929)
- The Blonde Nightingale (1930)
- A Thousand Words of German (1930)
- Dangers of the Engagement Period (1930)
- Pension Schöller (1930)
- Twice Married (1930)
- The Unfaithful Eckehart (1931)
- Storm in a Water Glass (1931)
- Such a Greyhound (1931)
- Ash Wednesday (1931)
- The True Jacob (1931)
- The Stranger (1931)
- Wibbel the Tailor (1931)
- The Testament of Cornelius Gulden (1932)
- The Escape to Nice (1932)
- A Night in Paradise (1932)
- The Big Bluff (1933)
- The Sandwich Girl (1933)
- Tell Me Who You Are (1933)
- Marion, That's Not Nice (1933)
- Een Zomerzotheid (1935)
- Suikerfreule (1935)
- Het Mysterie van de Mondscheinsonate (1936)
- The Trouble With Money (1936)

== Bibliography ==
- Ernest Mathijs. The Cinema of the Low Countries. Wallflower Press, 2004.
