= Maria Gartman =

Dutch actress (1818–1885)

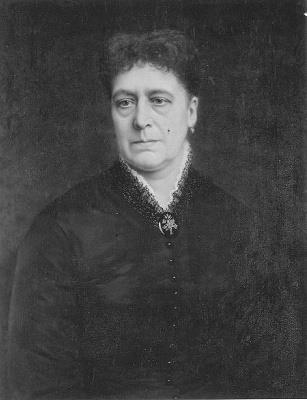
- Born: 31 December 1818
- Died: 30 September 1885

Maria Johanna Kleine-Gartman (31 December 1818 – 30 September 1885) was a Dutch stage actress and drama teacher.

Born in The Hague to the actor and ballet dancer Lawrence Gartman (1792-1828) and Philip Pina Jelgerhuis Maria. She married musician Leonard Ambrose Little (1818-1883) in 1836.

She was engaged at the Amsterdamse Schouwburg 1834–1846, at the Jean Eugène Duports Salon des Variétés in Nes 1846–56, at the Amsterdamse Schouwburg 1856–59, at the 'Vereenigde Tooneelisten' in 1859–63, a third time at the Amsterdamse Schouwburg 1863–72, at the 'Vereenigde Tooneelisten' in 1872–76, and at the 'Het Nederlandsch Tooneel' in 1876–85.

She was an instructor at the Amsterdam theatre school from its inception in 1874.

She died in Amsterdam.
