= Angèle Sydow =

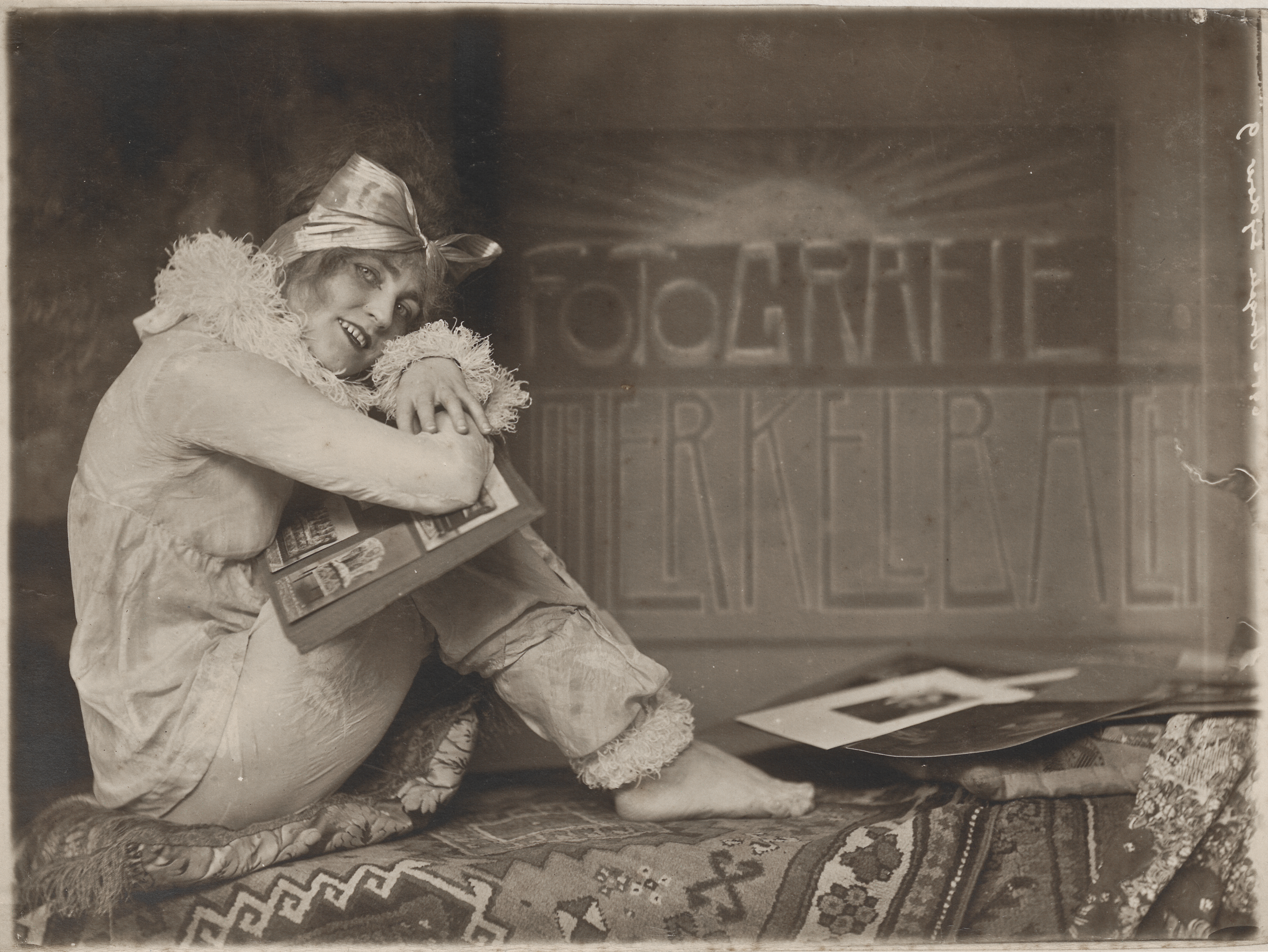
Studio photo by Jacob Merkelbach

Angèle Sydow (Śmiłowo, Poland 15 March 1890–The Hague, The Netherlands 18 December 1960) was a Polish–Dutch dancer. She was born near Kolmar as the daughter of Adelbert Sydow and Cecilia Graczyk.

== Gallery ==
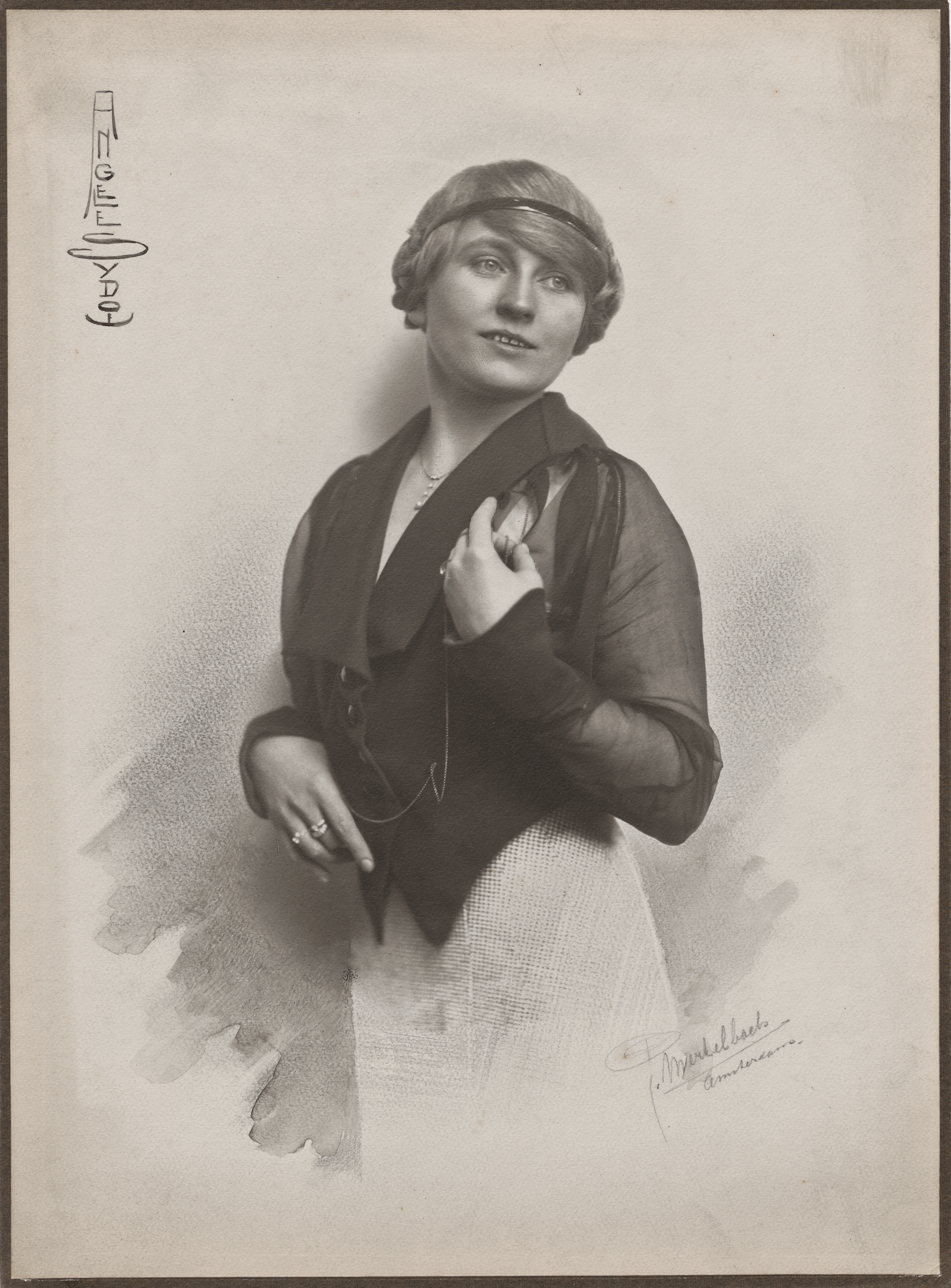

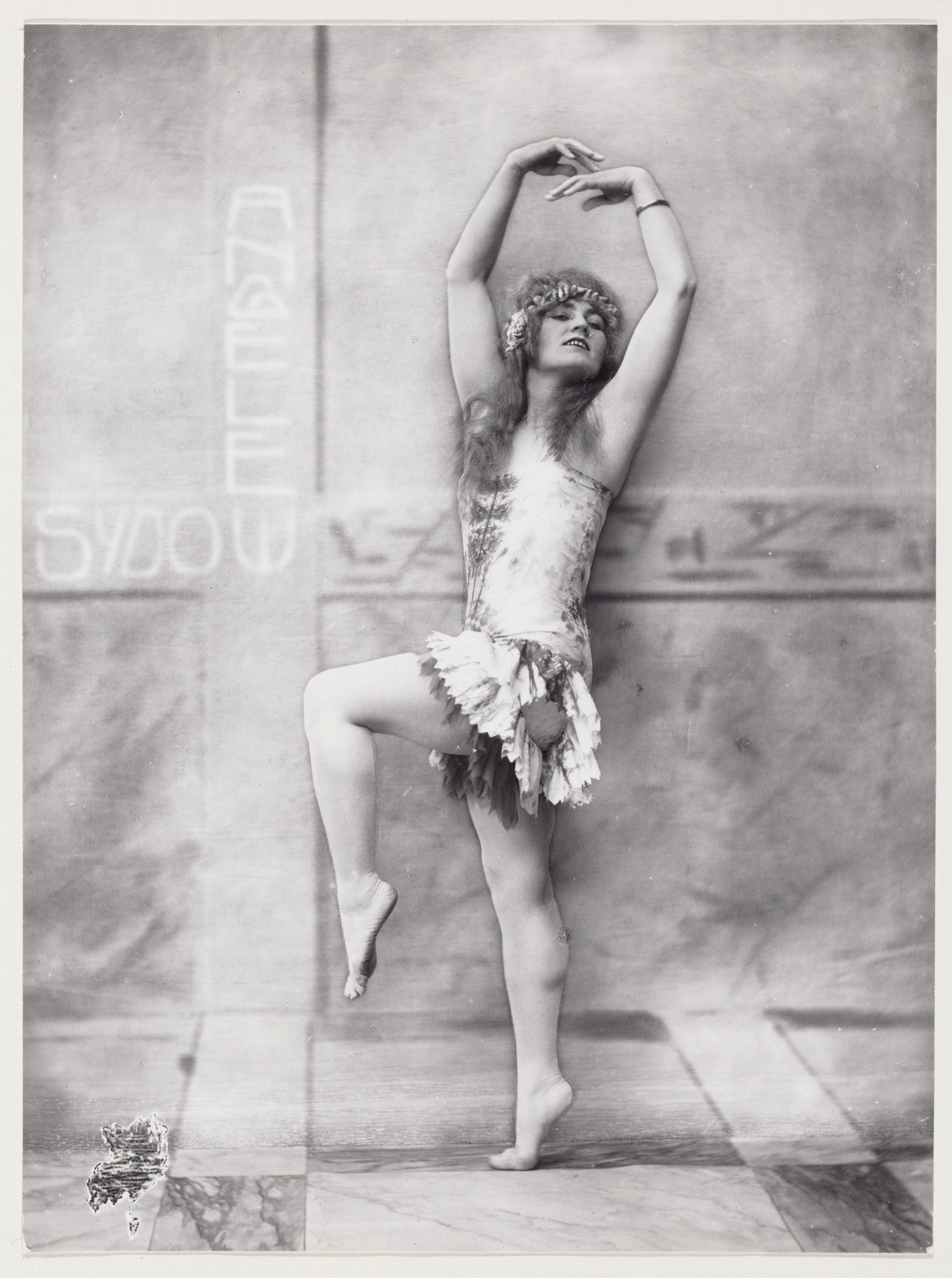
