= Joop ter Heul =

Joop ter Heul is a fictional character in a series of five books written for teenage girls by Dutch novelist Setske de Haan (1889-1948), who wrote under the pen name Cissy van Marxveldt. Joop is high-spirited, headstrong, and stubborn. The first four books, published from 1918 to 1925, deal with her high school years, her young adulthood, her marriage, and her sons. The last book was not written until more than twenty years later. The initial four books are remembered today for being a strong influence on diarist Anne Frank, both in the character of Joop, whom she identified with and in the epistolary style in which the books were written, which she adapted for her diary.

== FILM ==
In 1968 Joop ter Heul was the title of a film in the Netherlands based on the Marxveldt character.

== See also ==
- Cissy van Marxveldt
- Anne Frank
- The Diary of a Young Girl from entry dated Wednesday, October 14, 1942
- People associated with Anne Frank
