= Mussert's Wall =

Wall

Coordinates: 52°5′45″N 5°38′43″E

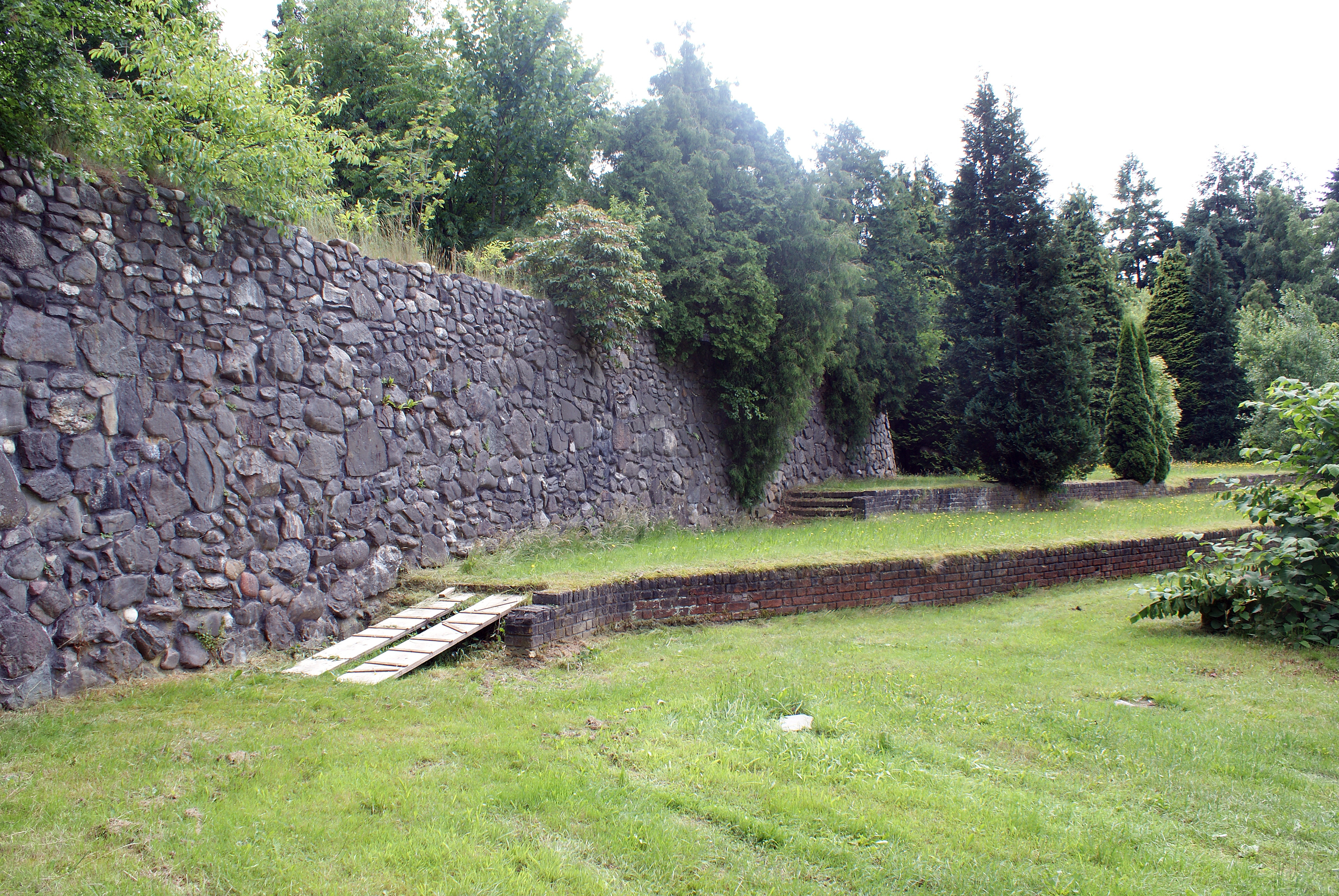
Wall of Mussert

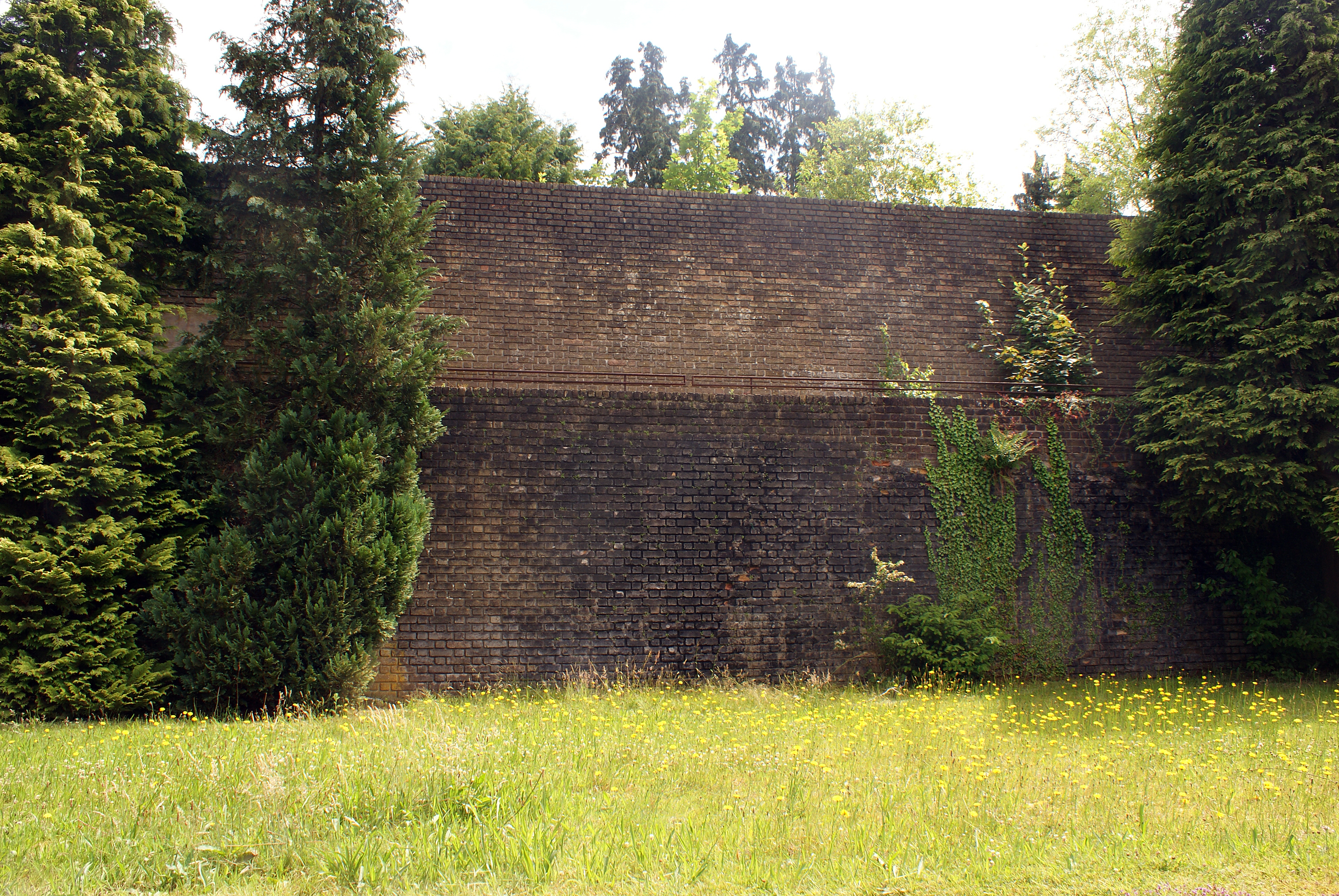
Wall of Mussert

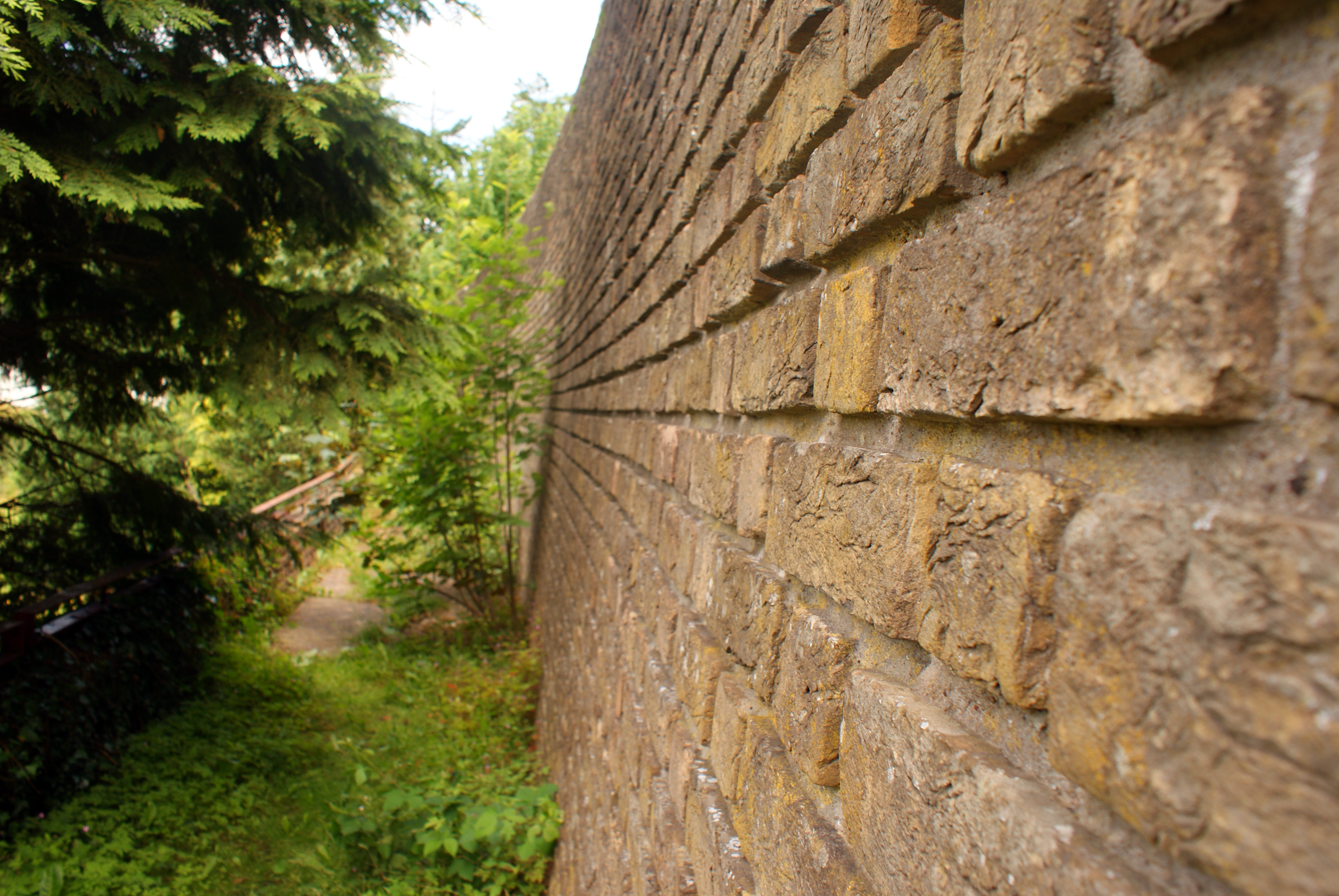
Wall of Mussert

The Mussert's Wall (Dutch: Muur van Mussert) is all that remains of a rally ground with buildings and monuments planned by Anton Mussert and his National Socialist Movement in the Netherlands (NSB) to house party meetings and hold national events to celebrate national-socialist thought in the Netherlands. The wall was built in 1938, on a plot of land the NSB had acquired near Lunteren in Gelderland, in the center of the country, and was inspired by the Nazi party rally grounds in Nuremberg.

Between 1936 and 1940, the NSB organized annual Hagespraken at the location, open-air propaganda meetings based on a supposed Germanic ideal and modeled after similar meetings in Germany. The place was visited by tens of thousands of NSB members, though the atmosphere was more that of a boy scout jamboree. One of the speakers at the (last) meeting on 22 June 1940 was Adriaan van Hees, who called for vengeance for the death of eight NSB members who had been executed during the German invasion of May 1940. After 1940, mass gatherings of a political kind were forbidden by the German occupying forces; after the war, the wall fell into disrepair. As of 2015 the wall, overgrown in places, is little more than a boundary for a local campground; the masonry is crumbling and the associated buildings are ruined.

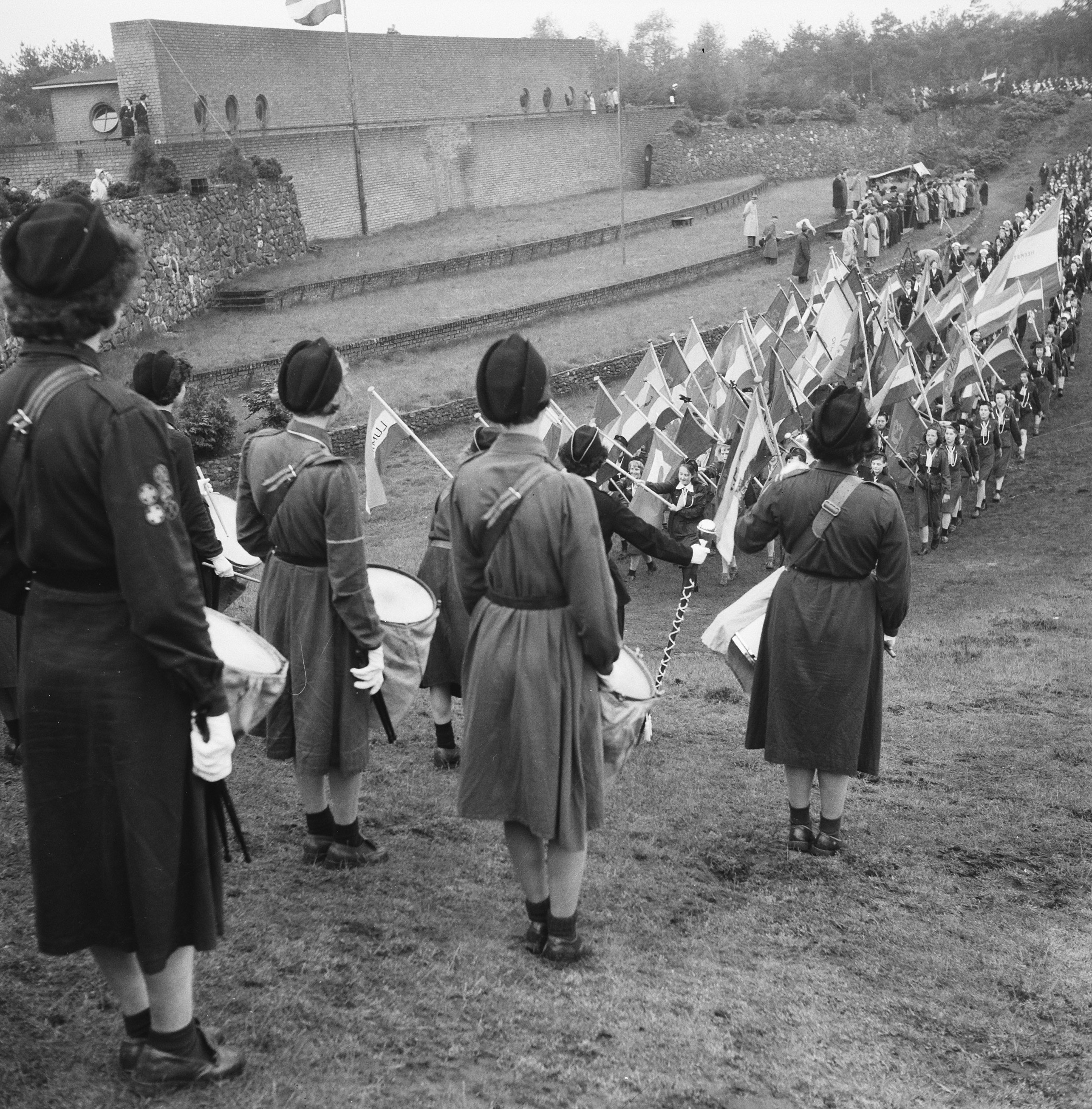
Muur van Mussert after the war, May 1951 during a scouting jubilee

In the early 2000s, the municipality of Ede wanted to have the wall declared a monument but backtracked, after protests by war veterans and others (including the Center for Information and Documentation Israel, an organization founded by the Dutch Jewish community), some of whom feared that the place would become a gathering point for the extreme right.
