= Lunteren =

- Town
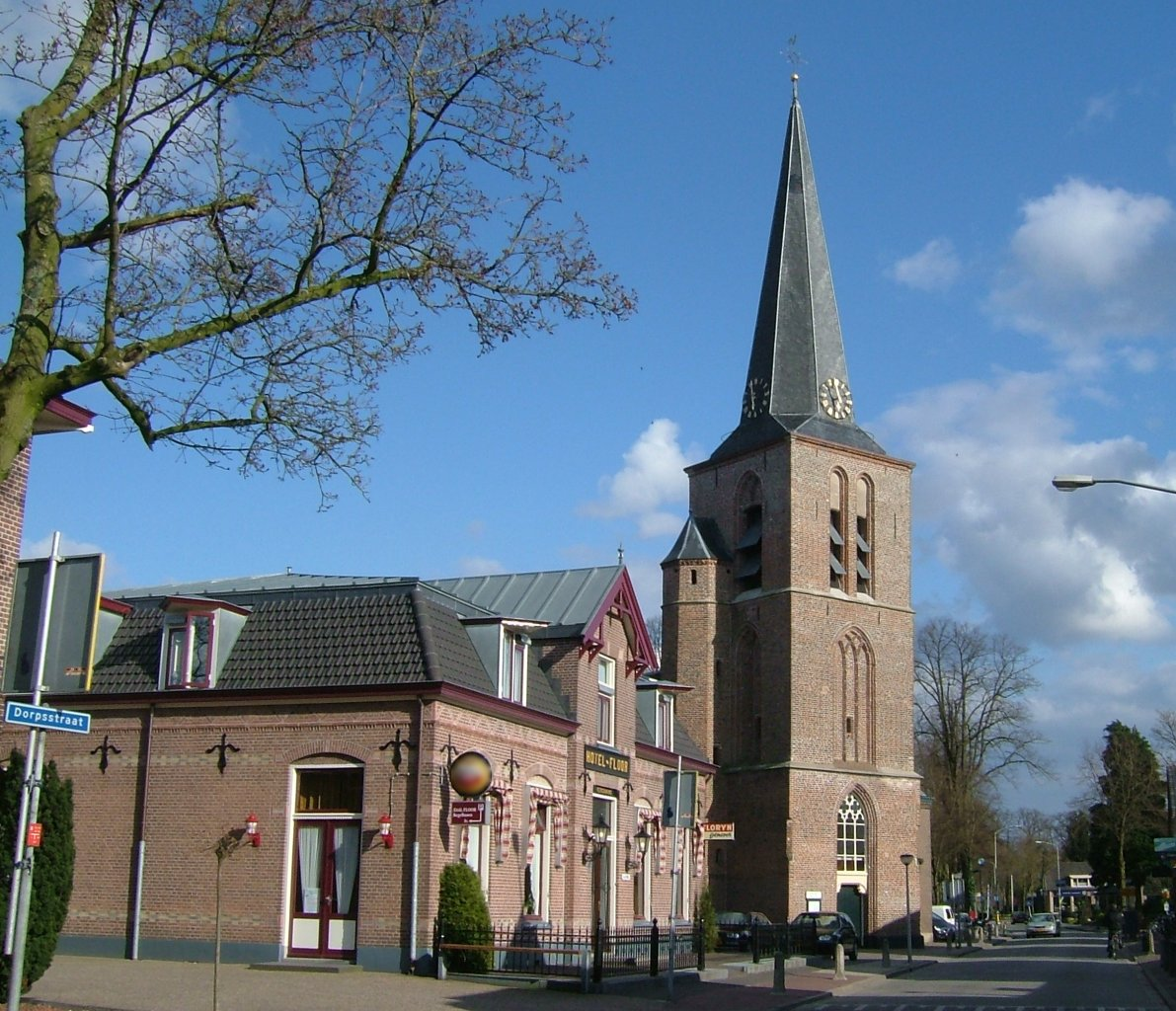
- The old church in Lunteren and the immediate surroundings

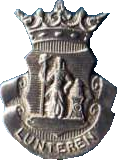
- Coat of arms

- Location in the Netherlands Lunteren (Netherlands)
- Coordinates: 52°5′14″N 5°37′19″E
- Country: Netherlands
- Province: Gelderland
- Municipality: Ede

Area
  - Total: 50.95 km^{2} (19.67 sq mi)
- Elevation: 16 m (52 ft)

Population (2021)
  - Total: 13,775
  - Density: 270.4/km^{2} (700.2/sq mi)
- Time zone: UTC+1 (CET)
  - Summer (DST): UTC+2 (CEST)
- Postal code: 6741
- Dialing code: 0318

Lunteren is a town in Gelderland, the Netherlands. It has a railway station on the line between Amersfoort and Ede.

It is well known for three conference centres in the vicinity, including Het Bosgoed, which mostly hosts academic conferences and De Werelt Congress Hotel.

It is also famous because the Geographical Center of the Netherlands is located northeast of the village, and because the National Socialist Movement in the Netherlands ("NSB") held their annual Hagespraken (propagandistic open-air meetings) there between 1936 and 1940. In 1938, the NSB built what is known as the Muur van Mussert ("wall of Mussert") there, which was planned as the first step in a large conglomeration of buildings and monuments for the party.

Lunteren was a separate municipality until 1818, when it was merged with Ede.

== Notable people ==
Hugo de Vries (1848–1935), botanist, died in Lunteren

== Gallery ==
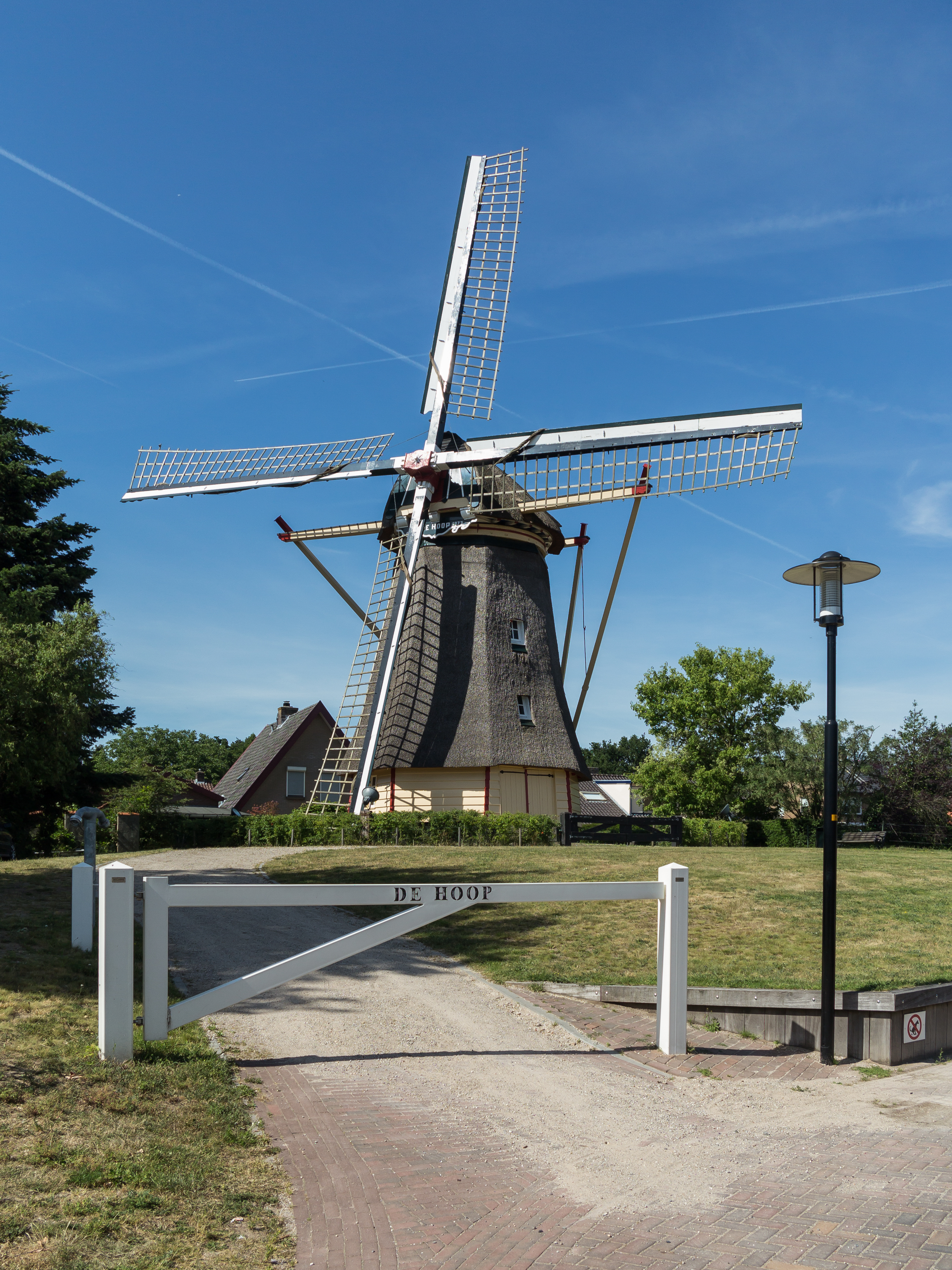
Windmill de Hoop, for milling corn

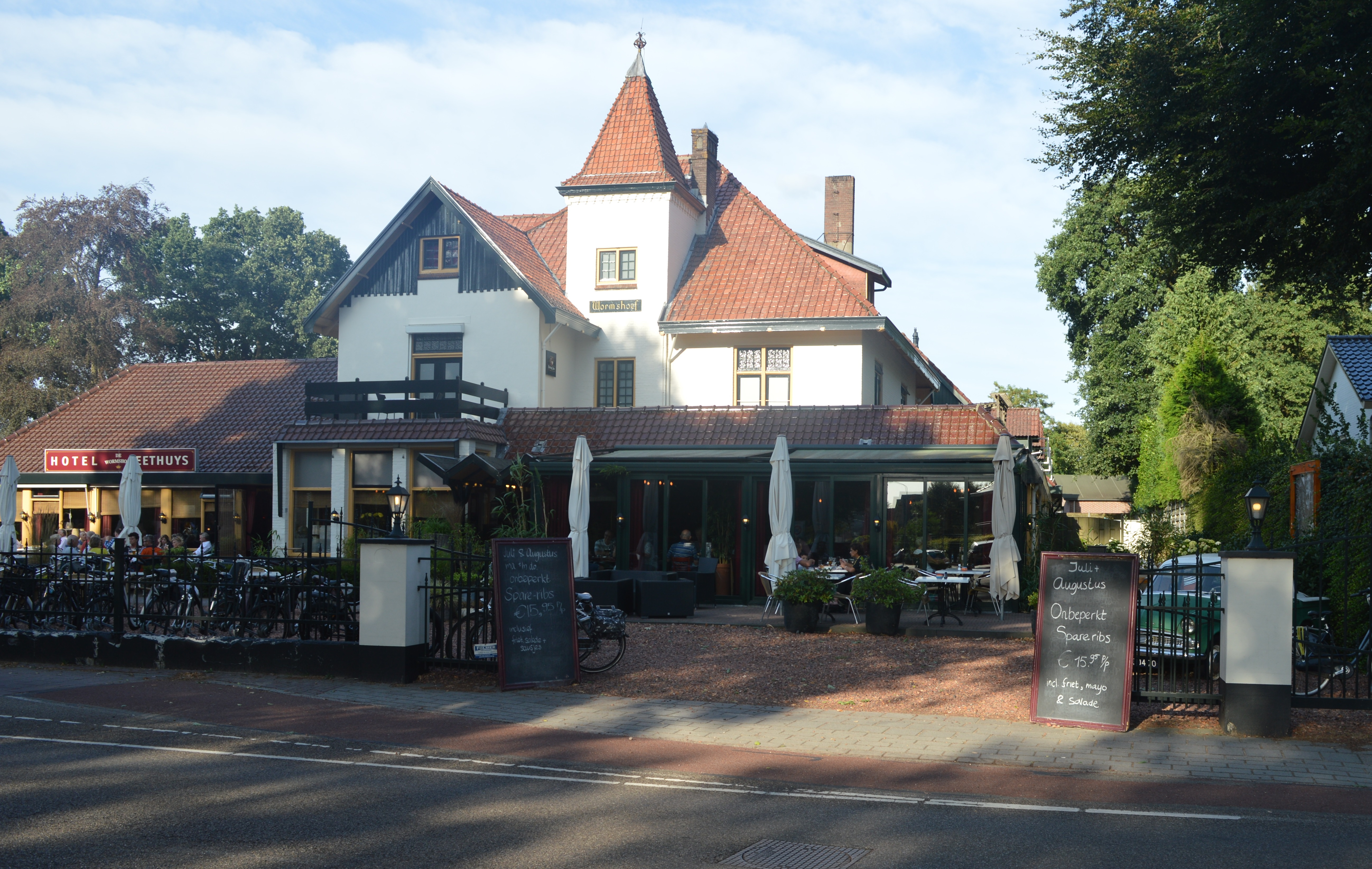
Restaurant De Wormshoef

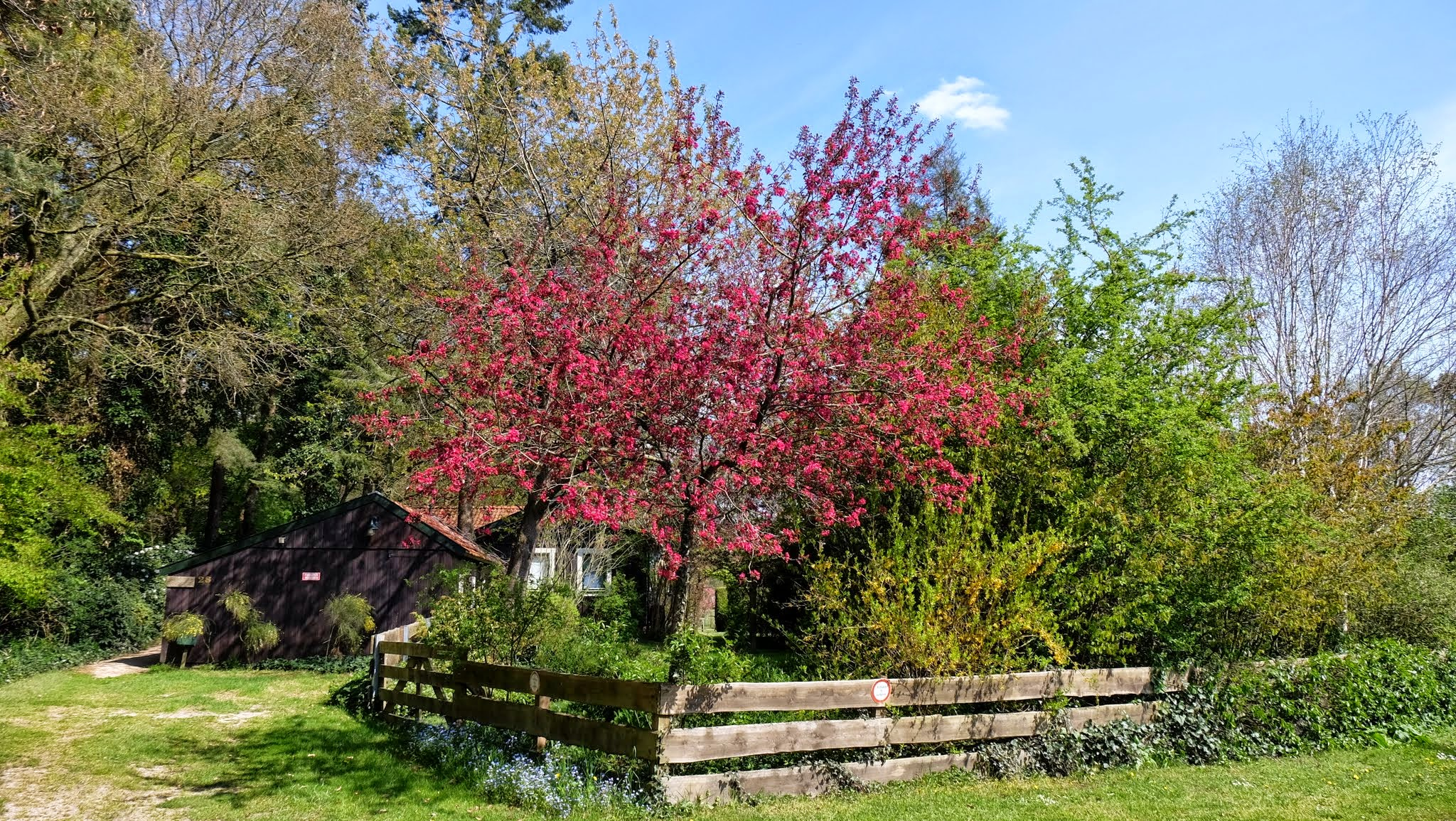
Tree in bloom

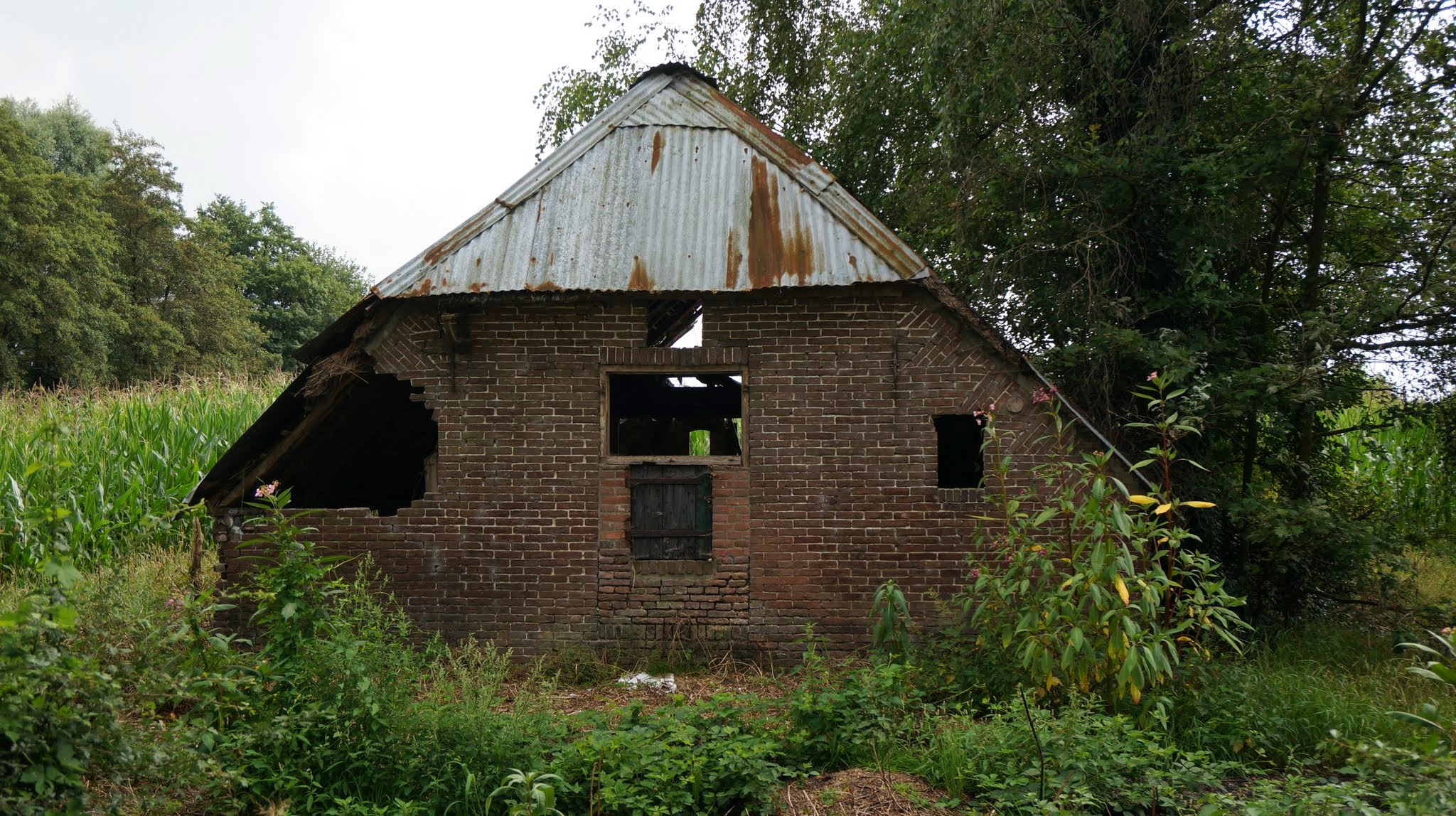
Abandoned barn in Lunteren
