= Young Hearts (1936 film) =

Jonge Harten
- Directed by: Charles Huguenot van der Linden, Heinz Josephson
- Written by: Charles Huguenot van der Linden, Heinz Josephson
- Release date: May 8, 1936
- Running time: 74 minutes
- Country: Netherlands
- Language: Dutch

Young Hearts or Jonge Harten is a 1936 Dutch film directed and written by Charles Huguenot van der Linden and the German exile Heinz Josephson.

== Cast ==
- Rini Otte ... Annie
- Leo de Hartogh ... Peter
- Lizzy Dernburg ... Maja
- Adriaan Van Hees... Hans
- Martha Posno ... Sip
