= Louis Saalborn =

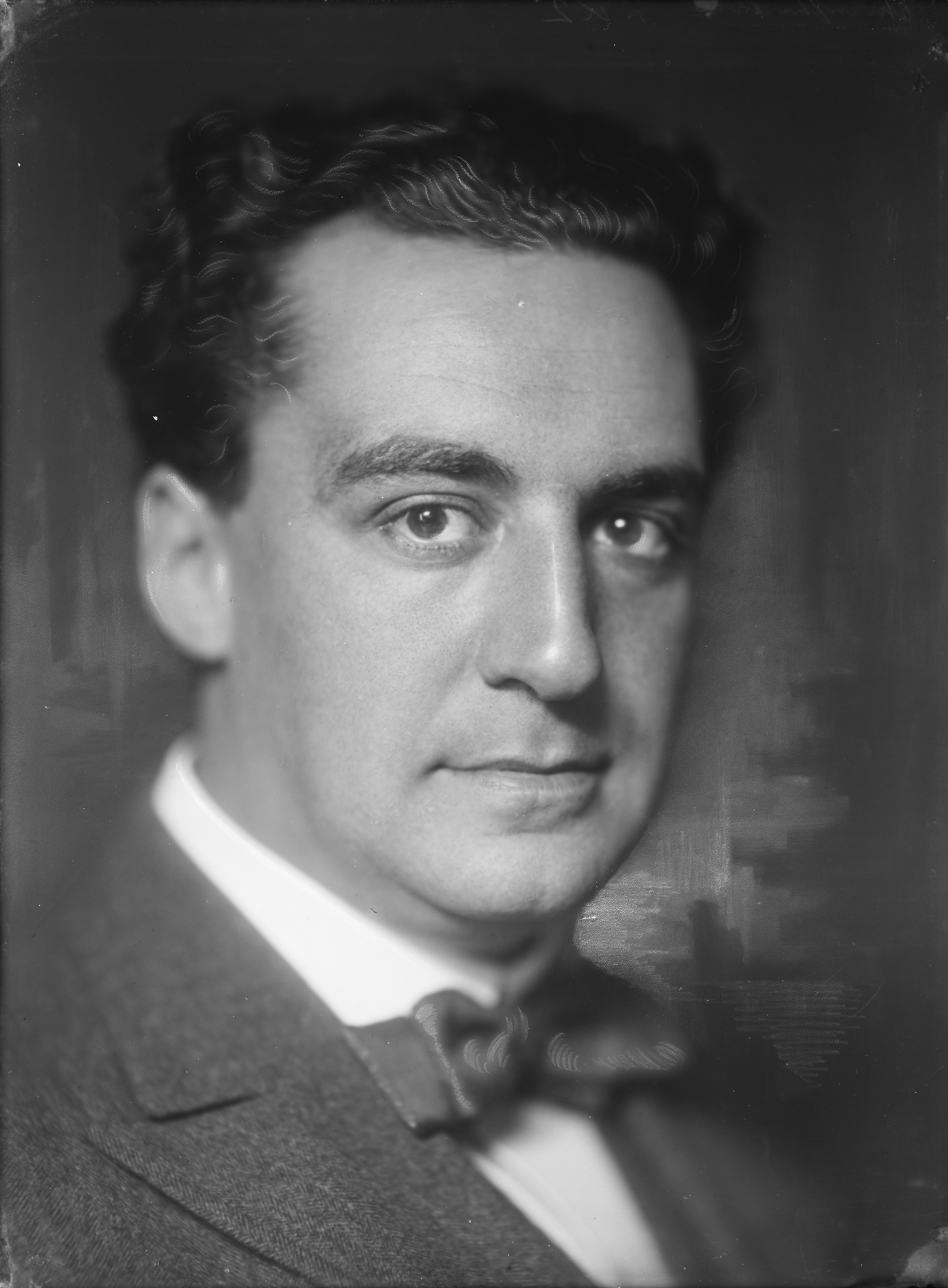
Portrait of Louis Saalborn

Louis Saalborn (Louis Alexander Abraham Zaalborn (Rotterdam, 13 June 1891–Amsterdam, 18 June 1957) was a Dutch polymath with mid-20th century careers in film and theatre, painting, and music.

== Film ==
1925

1932
