= Cor Ruys =

Dutch stage actor (1889–1952)

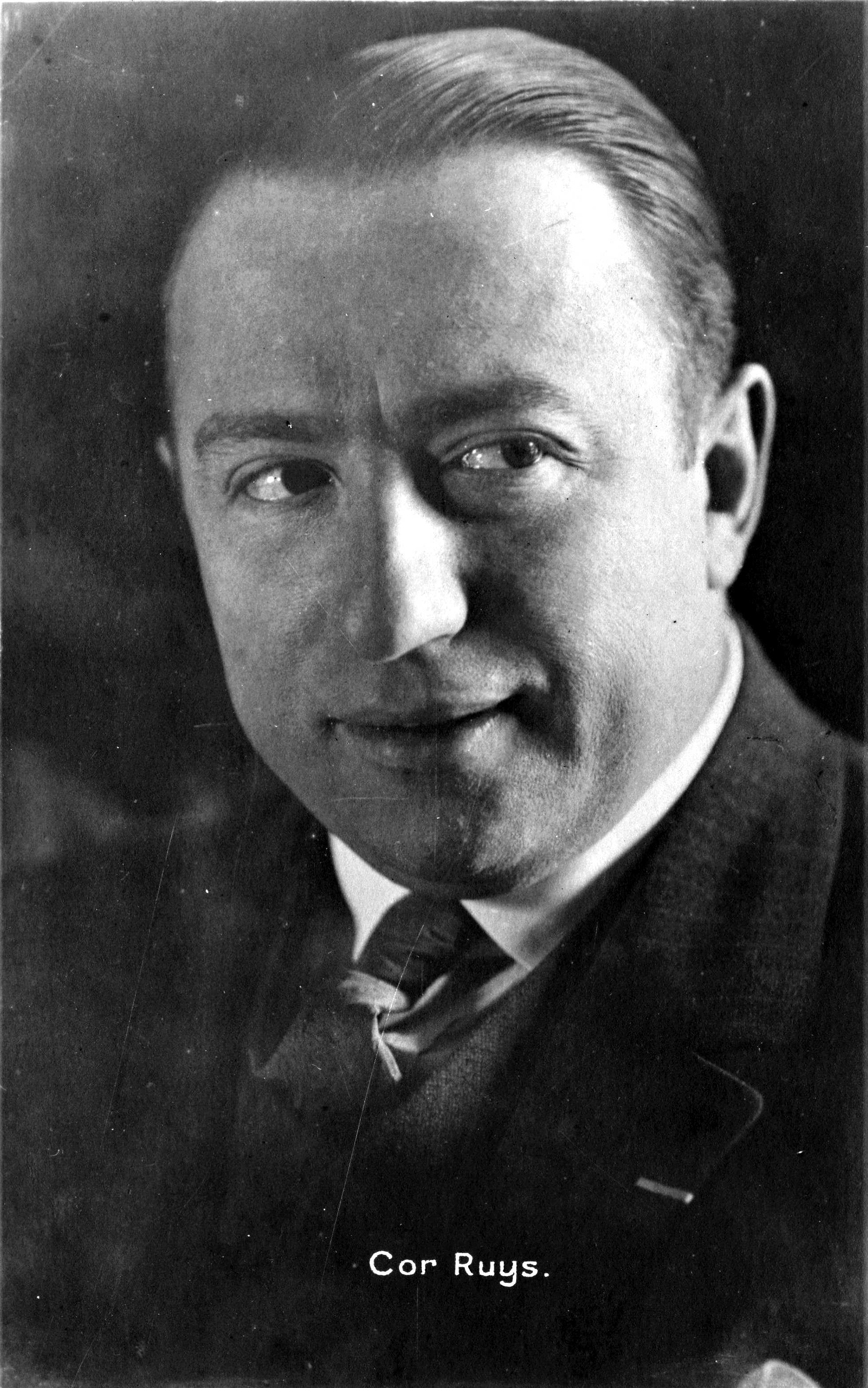
- Portrait photograph by Willem Coret, ±1935
- Born: Cornelis Ruijs; 10 February 1889; Amsterdam, Netherlands
- Died: 22 September 1952 (aged 63); Amsterdam, Netherlands
- Occupations: Actor, stage director
- Years active: 1905–1952
- Spouse: Tilly Lus (m. 1915)

Signature
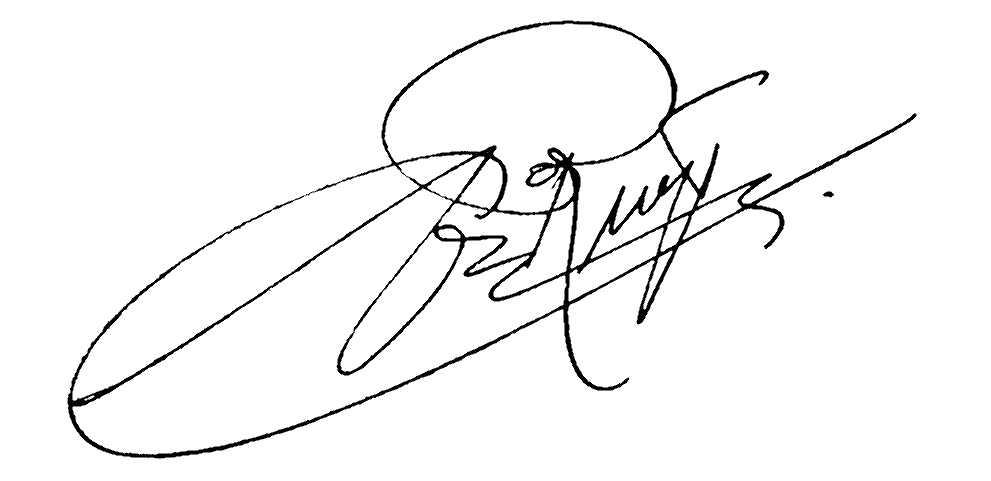

Cor Ruys (Cornelis Ruijs, 10 February 1889 – 22 September 1952) was a Dutch actor, stage director and comedian. He is best known for playing the character of 'Potasch' in Potash and Perlmutter by Montague Glass several times and his lead performance in Henry Koster’s 1935 film The Crosspatch.

== Biography ==
On February 10, 1889, Cor Ruys and his twin sister Hetty were born in Amsterdam. Cor's parents were actors Guillaume Gérard Corneille Ruys and Henriëtte Mathilde Spoor. He went to the three-year HBS, where together with classmates Albert van Dalsum and Adolf Bouwmeester he founded the "HBS-Bond" to organize theatre productions.

In 1905, Ruys started his acting career at the Nederlandsche Tooneelvereeniging of Adriaan van der Horst; initially as a volunteer, but after only three months he got a permanent commitment. It was here that he achieved his first success with an improvised imitation of the then popular operetta star August Kiehl during a performance of The Rising Sun by Herman Heijermans. During this period Ruys met actress Tilly Lus, whom he would later marry. Three directors were, according to him, "of priceless and lasting influence": Gustave Prot, Eduard Verkade, whom he described as "the inimitable director of intellect, of erudition, of psychology", and Nap de la Mar, whose company he – much to the surprise of many – joined in 1918 and who helped him develop the talent for improvisation for which he would become famous.

During his career he toured the Dutch East Indies several times, as an actor, but from 1919 on also as a director with his own company. From 1922 to 1924, he was the lead director at the Princesseschouwburg in The Hague. For his acclaimed staging of the piece Mademoiselle Bourat by Claude Anet, he was named Officer in the Ordre des Palmes académiques. Several years later he was also named officer in the Order of Orange-Nassau.

In the 1920s/30s his collaborations with Louis de Bree enjoyed great popularity. Ruys and De Bree regularly performed together as a duo in pieces such as Vicki Baum's Grand Hotel, Marcel Pagnol's Monsieur Topaze and, most notably, Potash and Perlmutter. The two also starred together in the extremely popular feature film The Crosspatch by Henry Koster, which played in Dutch cinemas for no less than seven years and proved a commercial success in the United Kingdom as well.

In the summers of 1940 to 1943, Ruys and his company took over the Kurhaus Cabaret in Scheveningen; the first regular company to perform there since the death of Louis Davids. Later the cabaret was renamed the Cor Ruys Summer Theater. There he played popular characters such as Flip Bangert, a man who is terribly afraid of his wife, and Piet Piederiet, a flutist without a palate, in often largely improvised skits.

On the night of 21–22 September 1952, Cor Ruys died at the age of 63 in an Amsterdam hospital, where he had recently been admitted to rest. On 25 September, between 10:00 and 11:00, a public farewell was held in the Municipal Theatre of Amsterdam. Between two and three thousand admirers brought Ruys their last greetings.

== Filmography ==
- De Damescoupeur (1919) — Jacques
- The Crosspatch (1935) — Baron Van Hergershuizen
- Komedie om Geld (1936) — Moorman

== Sources ==
- Kramer, F. (1925). Cor Ruys. Amsterdam: De Branding
- Du Croo, M. H. (1946). Cor Ruys. Maastricht: Leiter Nypels.
- Ruys, Gene (1974). Cor Ruys: acteur, regisseur, toneelleider. Zutphen: Walburg pers ISBN 9060112822
