= Suzanna Sablairolles =

Dutch stage actress

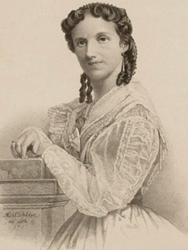
- Born: 13 January 1829; Middelburg, Zeeland, Netherlands
- Died: January 13, 1867 (aged 38); Amsterdam, Netherlands
- Occupation: actress
- Partner: Pierre Auguste Morin
- Children: 4
- Parents: Jacob Hendrik Sablairolles (father); Johanna Scholten (mother)
- Relatives: Wilhelmina Sablairolles (sister); August Kiehl (nephew)

Suzanna Nannette Sablairolles (13 January 1829, Middelburg – 13 January 1867, Amsterdam) was a Dutch stage actress.

== Life ==
She was born to actor Jacob Henry Sablairolles (1793–1833) and costume dresser Johanna Scholten (1793–1842). Her sister, Wilhelmina Sablairolles, was also an actress. Her nephew, August Kiehl, was an actor and playwright.

She was active at the Zuid-Hollandsche Tooneelisten in The Hague in 1839-1853, at the Amsterdamse Schouwburg 1853-1857 and 1859–1867, and the Rotterdamse Schouwburg in 1857-1859.

Suzanna Sablairolles was known for her roles as the heroine of romantic tragedies. She had a long-term love relationship with her colleague Pierre Auguste Morin from 1851; the couple often played onstage lovers, which was much appreciated by the public. She had four children with Morin, but they did not marry. She was very popular and referred to as "The jewel of the theatre company" and the darling of the public.

She died in childbirth in the middle of a successful tour and her death was much reported in the media.
