= Mary Dresselhuys =

Dutch actress (1907–2004)

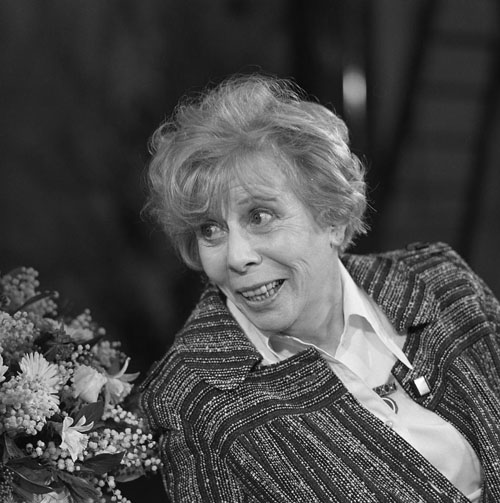
Mary Dresselhuys in 1982

Mary Dresselhuys (January 22, 1907 – May 19, 2004) was primarily a Dutch stage actress, although she also appeared in a number of films. She was born in Tiel, the Netherlands, and died in Amsterdam. She and her husband, Cees Laseur, were the parents of actress Petra Laseur.

Dresselhuys portrayed more than 150 characters during her long career. She acted in a wide range of roles but was most known as the Queen of Comedy, and continued to perform well into her 90s. After she turned 80, she asked Paul Haenen to write a play, Een bijzonder prettig vergezicht ('A particularly pleasant view'), in which she and her daughter could perform together. At age 85, she played a part in Eline Vere, and at 90 she was back on stage to do a retrospective of her career, together with Paul Haenen.

== Early years ==
Dresselhuys began acting while still a gymnasium student. Spending her vacations with her grandmother in The Hague, she took every opportunity to go to the theatre, getting a front row seat if possible. Already in her teens she managed to see about 200 plays, making notes about the plays and actors she saw in a notebook which she kept throughout her life. After high school Dresselhuys spent half a year in at English boarding school, after which she took the entrance exam for the Toneelschool (drama school) in Amsterdam without her parents' knowledge. She passed.

After graduation, in 1929 Dresselhuys, won her first role in the play Men trouwt geen meisjes zonder geld (One Doesn't Marry Girls Without Money). From 1931 until 1945 she performed with the Centraal Tooneel company. In 1958, she appeared onstage in Wie is Janus? (Who is Janus?), a translation of Carolyn Green's play Janus.

Selected filmography:

- The Crosspatch (De Kribbebijter) (1935) .... Mary
- The Village on the River (Dorp aan de rivier) (1958) .... Mrs. Van Taeke
- Vroeger kon je lachen ('You used to be able to laugh') (1983) .... Woman at station
- Eline Vere (1991) .... Mevrouw van Raat
