= Wilhelmina Sablairolles =

Dutch stage actress (1818–1891)

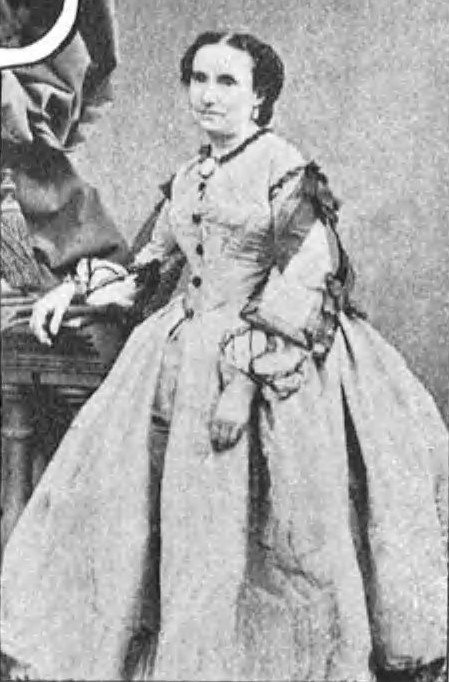
- Born: 11 August 1818; The Hague, Netherlands
- Died: August 19, 1891 (aged 73); Rotterdam, South Holland, Netherlands
- Occupation: actress
- Spouse: Jean Cretien Valois
- Children: 8
- Parents: Jacob Hendrik Sablairolles (father); Johanna Scholten (mother)
- Relatives: Suzanna Sablairolles (sister); August Kiehl (nephew)

Wilhelmina Gerretje Sablairolles (11 August 1818 – 19 August 1891) was a Dutch stage actress. She was born into a thespian family and began her career as a child. As an young woman, she performed in breeches and ingénue roles. Her stage career lasted for forty-two years.

== Biography ==
Sablairolles was born on 11 August 1818 in The Hague to Jacob Hendrik Sablairolles, an actor, and Johanna Scholten, a costume dresser. Her sisters, Suzanna Nannette, Sophie Theodora, and Henriëtte Jacqueline, also became actresses. She was raised in the Protestant faith.

As a child, Sablairolles was involved with a theatre company ran by Willem Weddelooper and, from 1833 to 1876, with Le Gras, Van Zuylen, and Haspels in Rotterdam. She was also involved at the Zuid-Hollandsche Tooneelisten. She performed for the first time at the age of four, as Karel in August Wilhelm Iffland's The Player of Revanche Prague. She performed at the Kleine Komedie in Rotterdam until 1884. Her career began with child roles and later progressed to breeches roles and ingénue roles.

In 1845, Sablairolles married the painter Jean Cretien Valois. She gave birth to eight children, six of whom lived to adulthood. Three of their daughters, Wilhelmina, Jacqueline Henriette, and Esther Johanna went on to become actresses. She was the aunt of the actor and playwright August Kiehl.

Her husband became the theater director at Koninklijke Schouwburg in 1854, after which she was often given leading roles. Sablairolles was referred to "The Hague's wife Kleine", in reference to Maria Kleine-Gartman, who was a leading actress in the Netherlands.

Sablairolles died on 19 August 1891 in Rotterdam.
