= Charles Vandenhove =

Belgian architect (1927–2019)

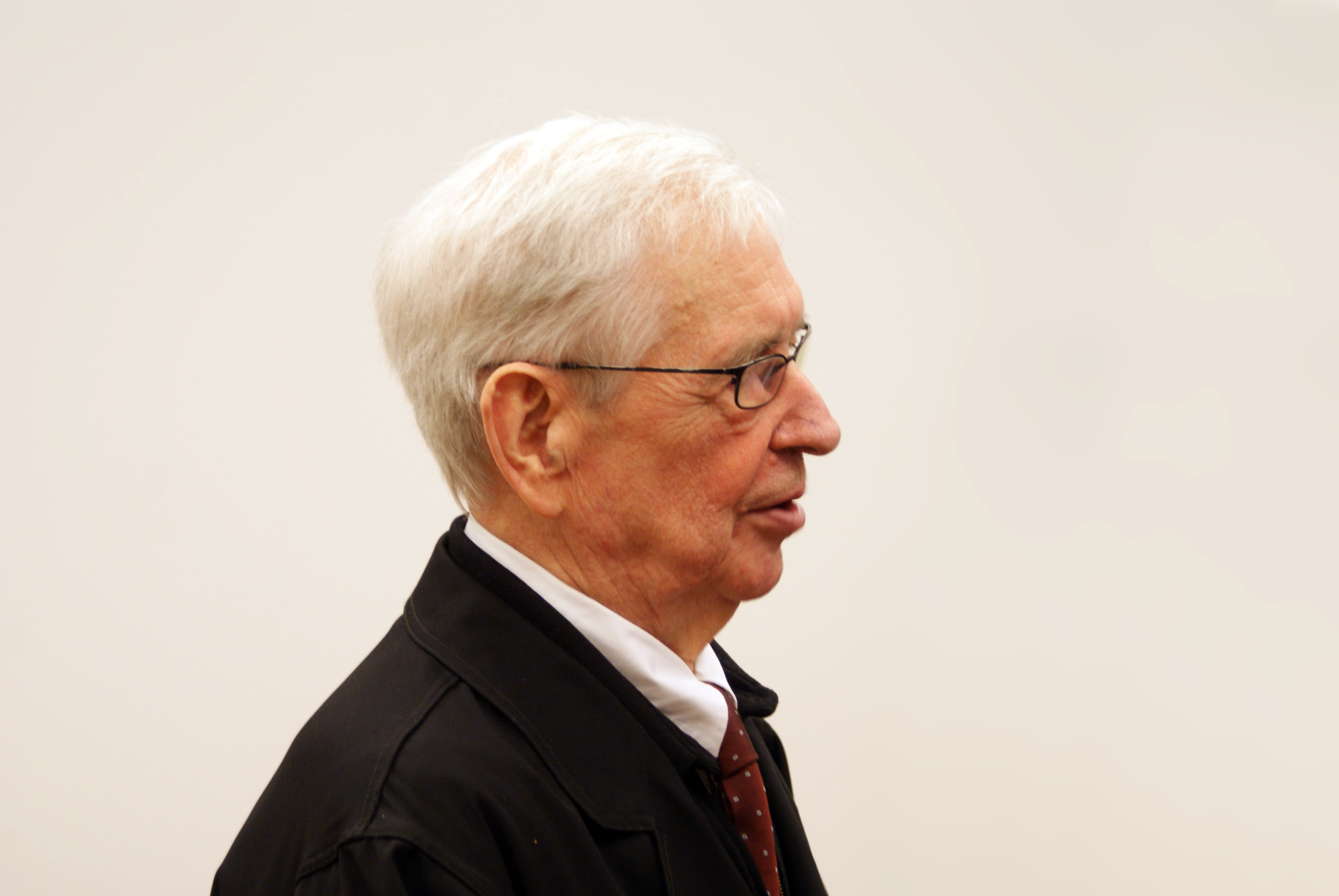
- Vandenhove in 2010
- Born: 3 July 1927; Teuven
- Died: 22 January 2019 (aged 91)
- Occupation: Architect
- Projects: Academisch ziekenhuis C.H.U., Liège Renovation of the Koninklijke Schouwburg, The Hague

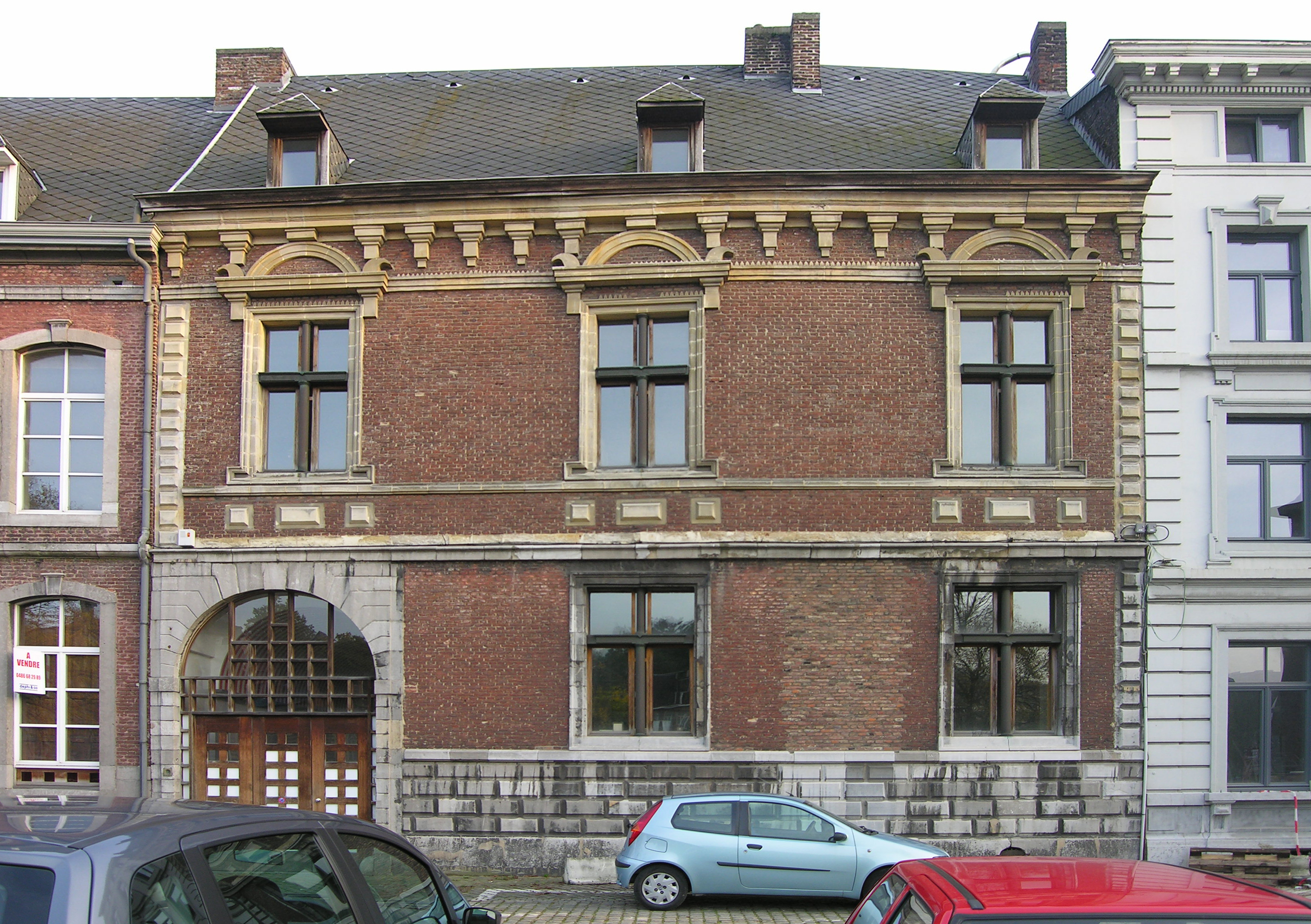
Hôtel Torrentius, 16th century home in Liège, renovated in 1981 by Vandenhove

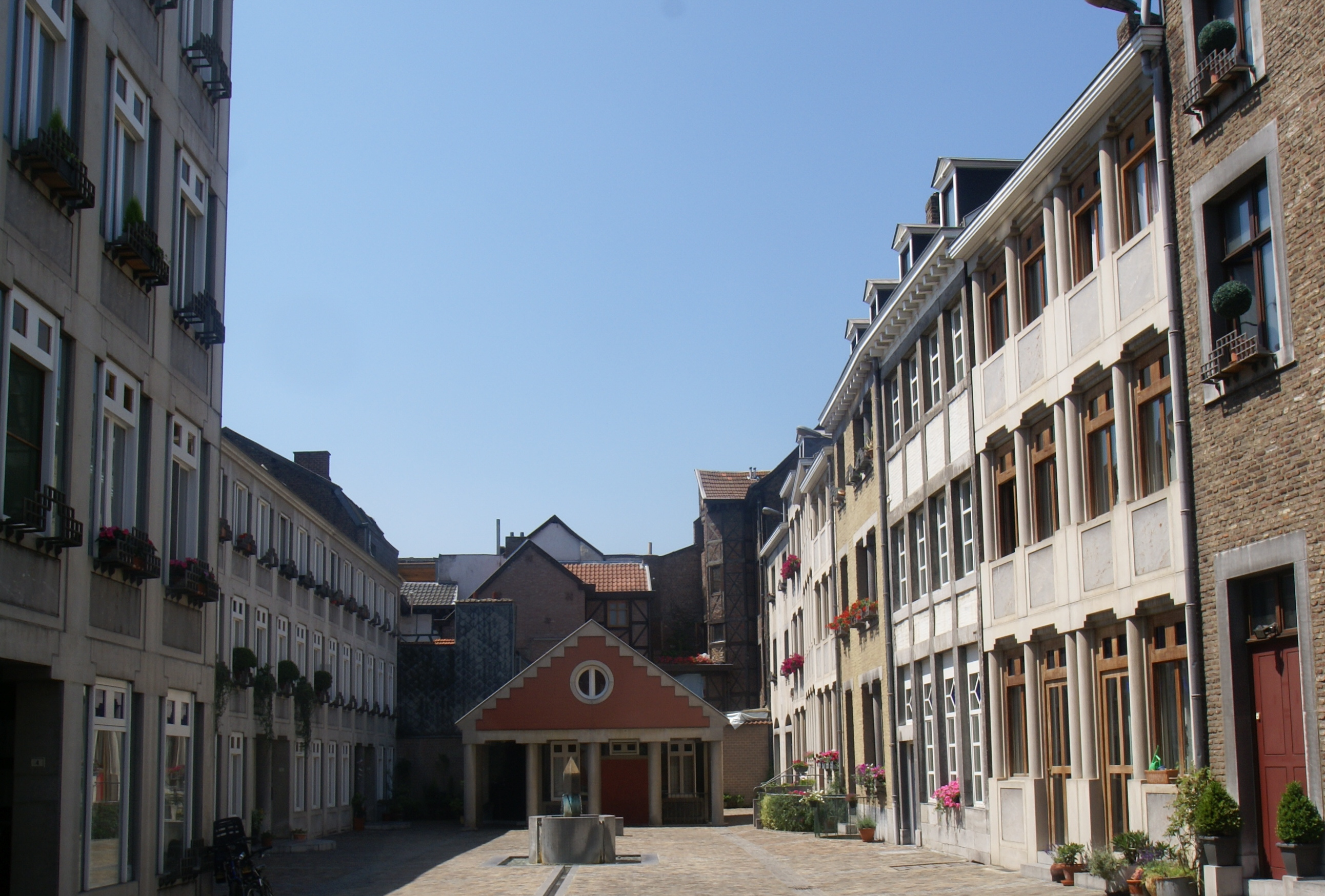
Cour Saint-Antoine (1978-85) in Liège

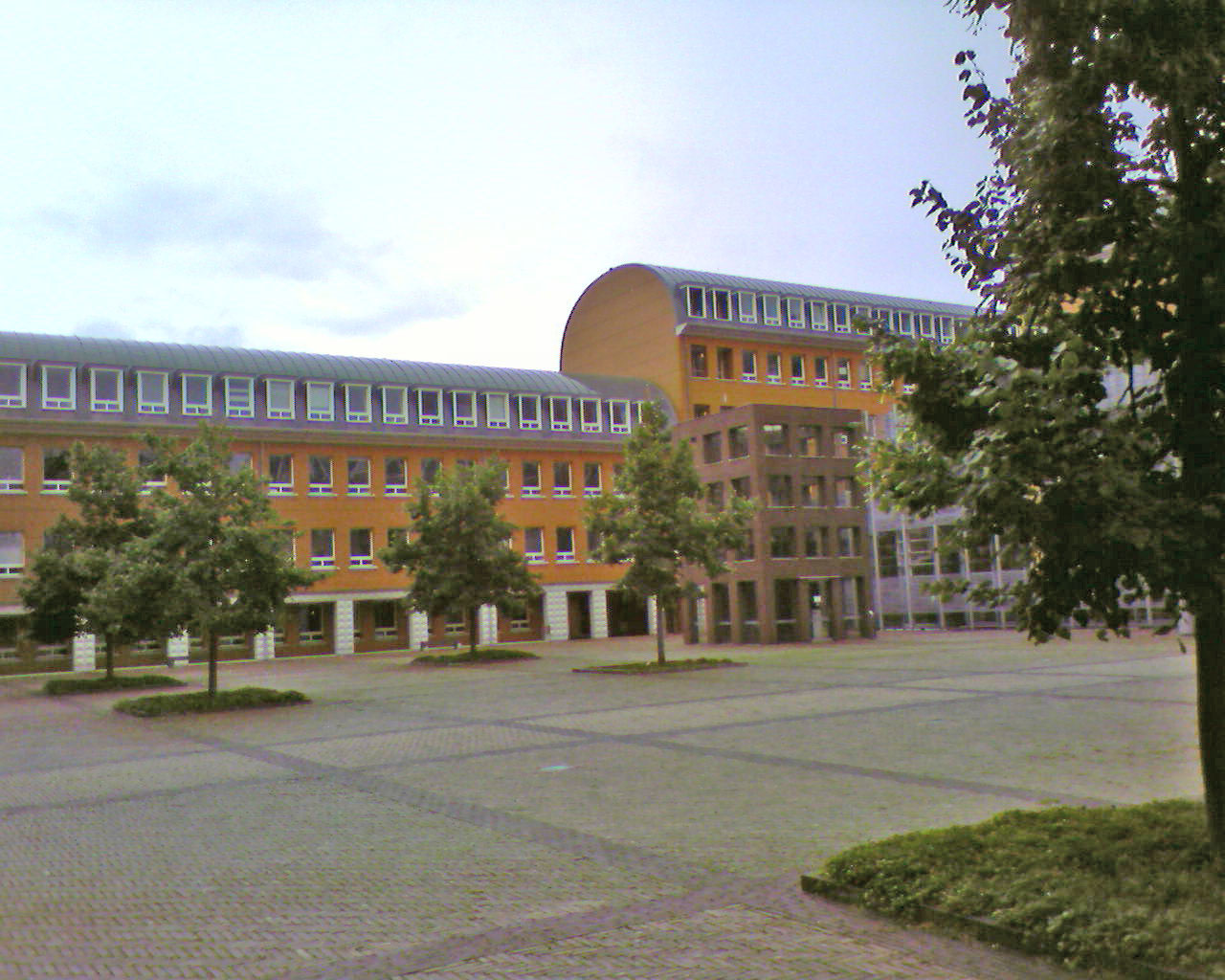
Palace of Justice (1998), Den Bosch, Netherlands

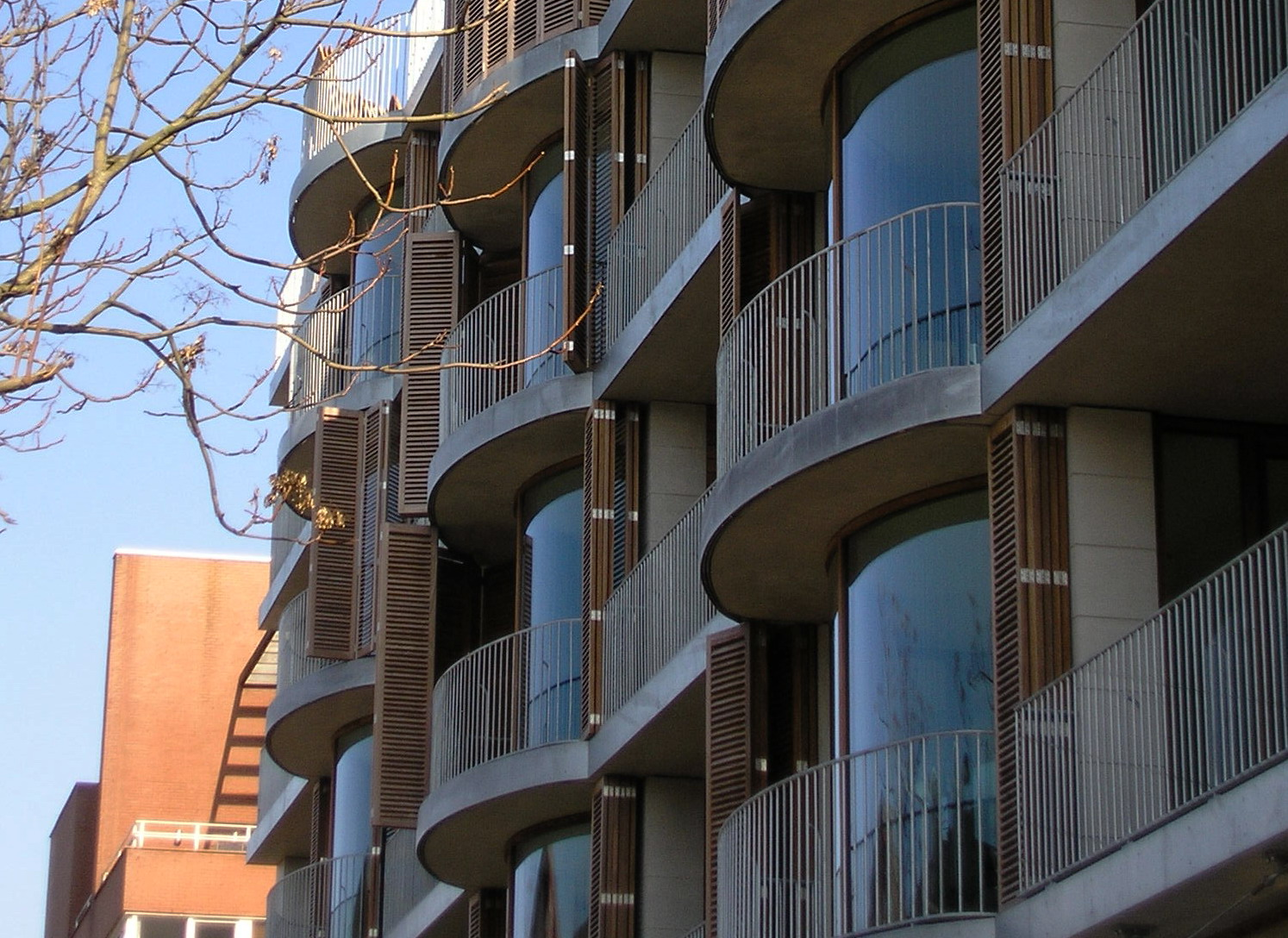
Detail Maison Céramique (2009), Maastricht, Netherlands

Charles, Knight Vandenhove (3 July 1927, Teuven – 22 January 2019, Liège) was one of the leading Belgian architects of the 20th century. His company Charles Vandenhove et associés is based in Liège, Belgium. He is mostly known for his work in Belgium, the Netherlands and Paris ranging from the 1950s to the 2010s.

== Biography ==
Vandenhove graduated in 1945 from the Liège university of applied sciences Saint-Luc and in 1951 from the university of applied sciences for architecture La Cambre in Brussels. Vandenhove became famous with his design for the university campus Sart-Tilman (Liège Science Park) of the University of Liège in the 1970s. He demonstrated with his project Cour Saint-Antoine in the inner city of Liège that modern functional concepts can be merged with a respect for the historical fabric of the old city. Since the 1990s, Vandenhove was mostly active in the Netherlands. Many of the homes designed by Vandenhove can be recognized by typical half-round zinc roofs, French balconies and Louvre shutters.

In the 1980s and 1990s, Vandenhove collaborated with artists such as Sol LeWitt, Daniel Buren and Giulio Paolini in designing buildings such as the academic hospital of Liège, the Koninklijke Schouwburg in The Hague and the La Monnaie in Brussels. He also involved artists in the renovation and decoration of his own home, the 16th century city palace Hôtel Torrentius in Liège.

Charles and his wife Jeanne Vandenhove loaned their art collection of post-1945 European art in 2007 for long term to the Bonnefantenmuseum in Maastricht. The collection is currently maintained by the Stichting Charles Vandenhove (English: Charles Vandenhove Foundation) and is since 2012 permanently on display in a new home in Ghent, nearby the Henri Van de Veldes Boekentoren.

=== Recognition ===
On 19 March 2016; Vandenhove was appointed as doctor honoris causa at the University of Liège.

== Projects ==
- Academic Hospital C.H.U., Liège, Sart-Tilman, 1962-1987
- Sporthal Standard, Liège, 1968
- Universiteitssporthal Liège, Sart-Tilman, 1972
- Renovation and new constructions Hors-Château and Cour Saint-Antoine, Liège, 1978–85
- Renovation Hôtel Torrentius, Liège, 1981
- Renovation La Monnaie, Brussels, 1986
- Homes at Zieken, Huygenspark The Hague, 1987, 1992
- Renovation and extension Koninklijke Schouwburg, The Hague, 1991, 1999
- Apartment building de Liefde, Bilderdijkstraat, Amsterdam, 1992
- Homes at the Charles Voscour, Maastricht, 1993
- Apartment buildings Bassecour, Wageningen, 1993-1997
- Renovation Théâtre de la ville - rue des Abbesses, Paris, 1996
- Homes at the Kanunnikkencour, Maastricht, 1996
- Palace of Justice, 's-Hertogenbosch, 1998
- Homes at Poort van Breda, Breda, 1999
- Apartment building De Croissant and homes at the Bocht van Guinea, The Hague, 1999
- Faculty building, University of Groningen, 2001
- Apartment building Statenplein, Dordrecht, 2003
- Homes at Getsewoud, Nieuw-Vennep, 2002
- Antenne Sociale, OCMW, Brussels (Laeken), 2003
- City hall of Ridderkerk, 2004
- Catharinahuis Eindhoven, 2004
- Apartment building De Kölleminder, Venlo, 2006
- Apartment building Maison Céramique, Maastricht-Céramique, 2009

== Gallery ==
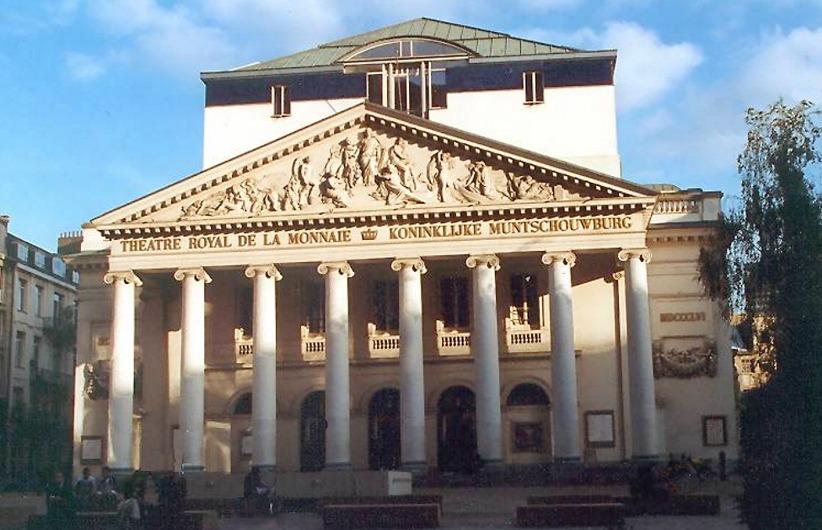
Extension of La Monnaie, Brussels

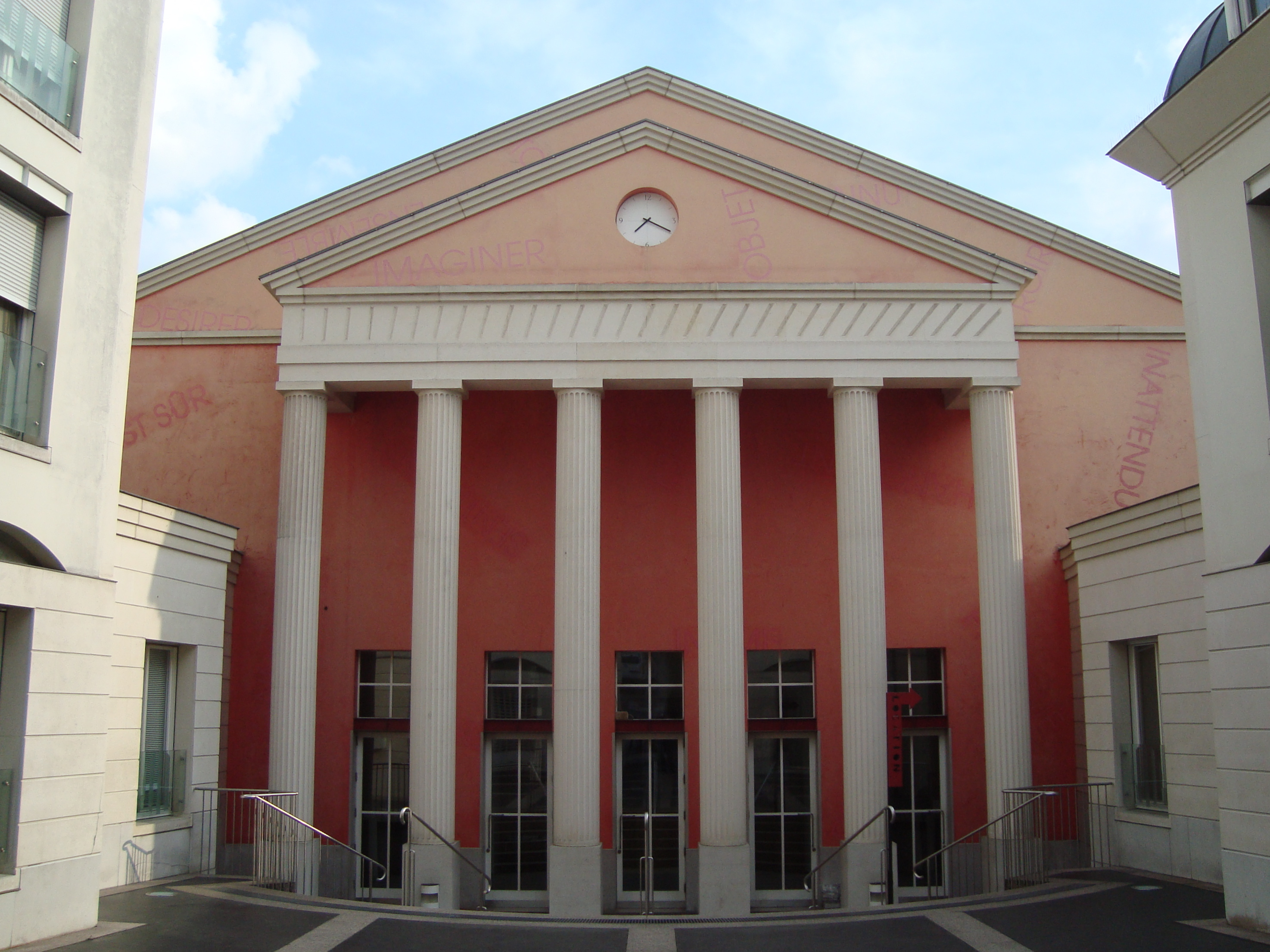
Extension Thêatre des Abbesses, Paris

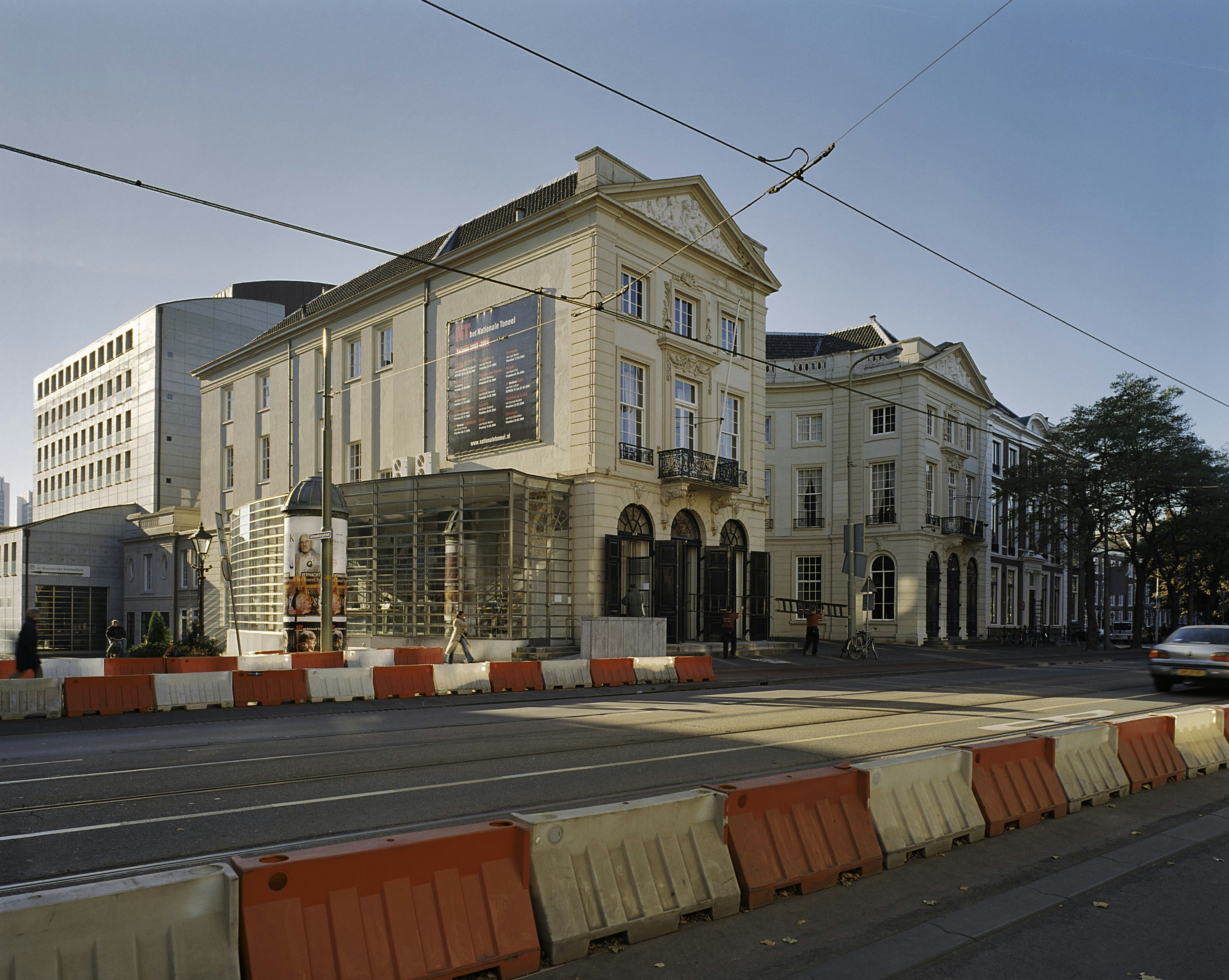
Extension Koninklijke Schouwburg, The Hague

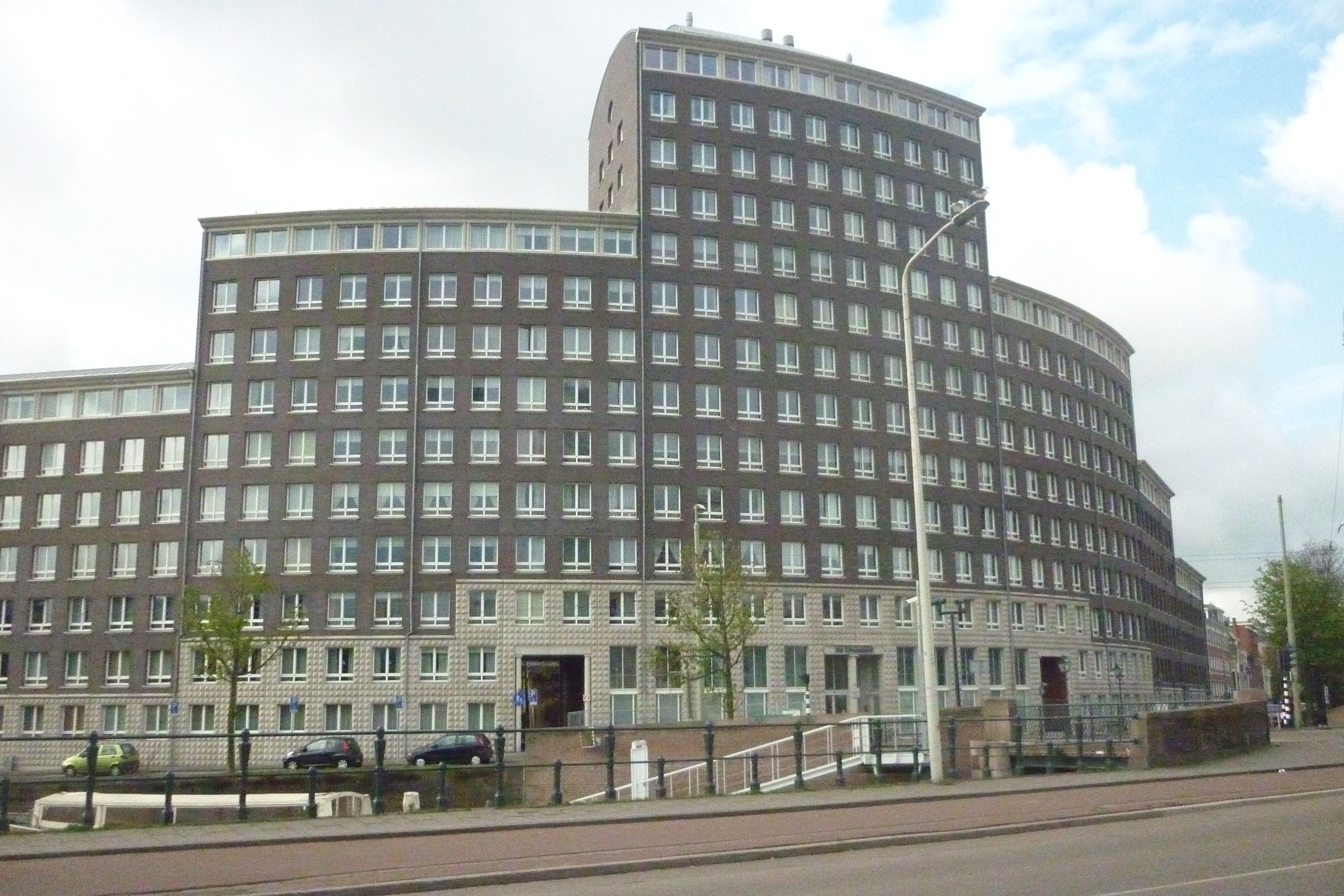
De Croissant, The Hague

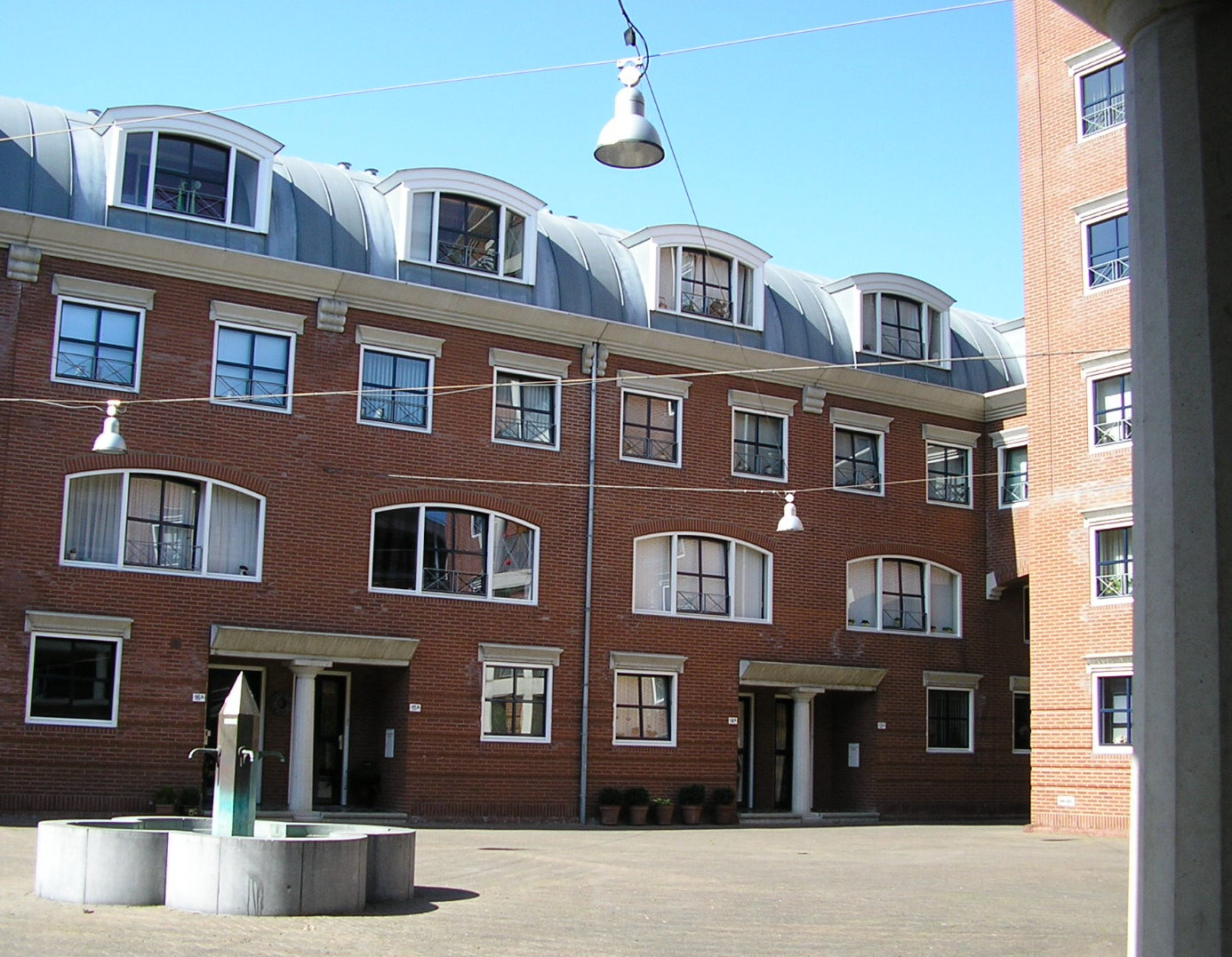
Charles Voscour, Maastricht

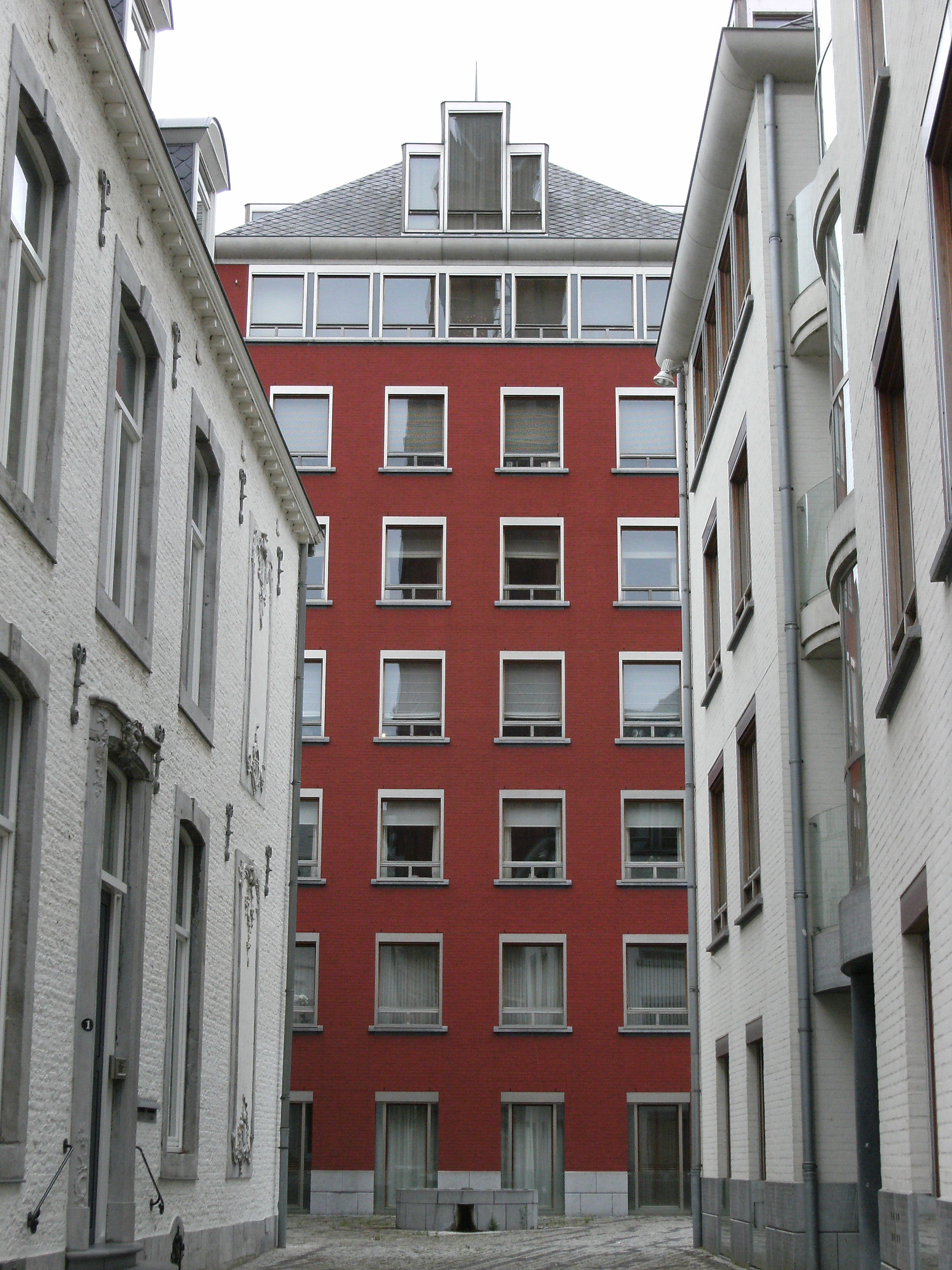
Kanunnikencour, Maastricht

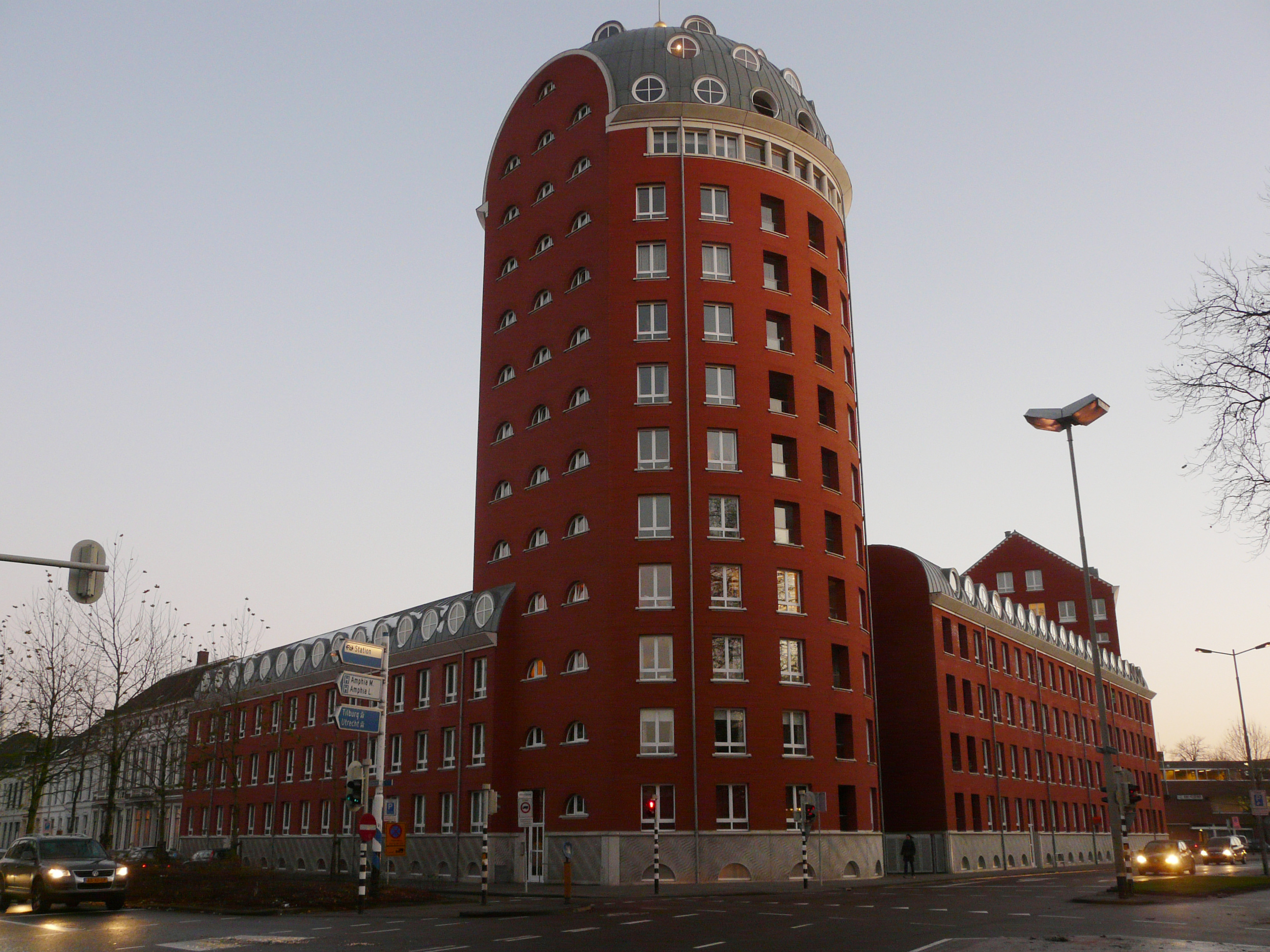
Poort van Breda

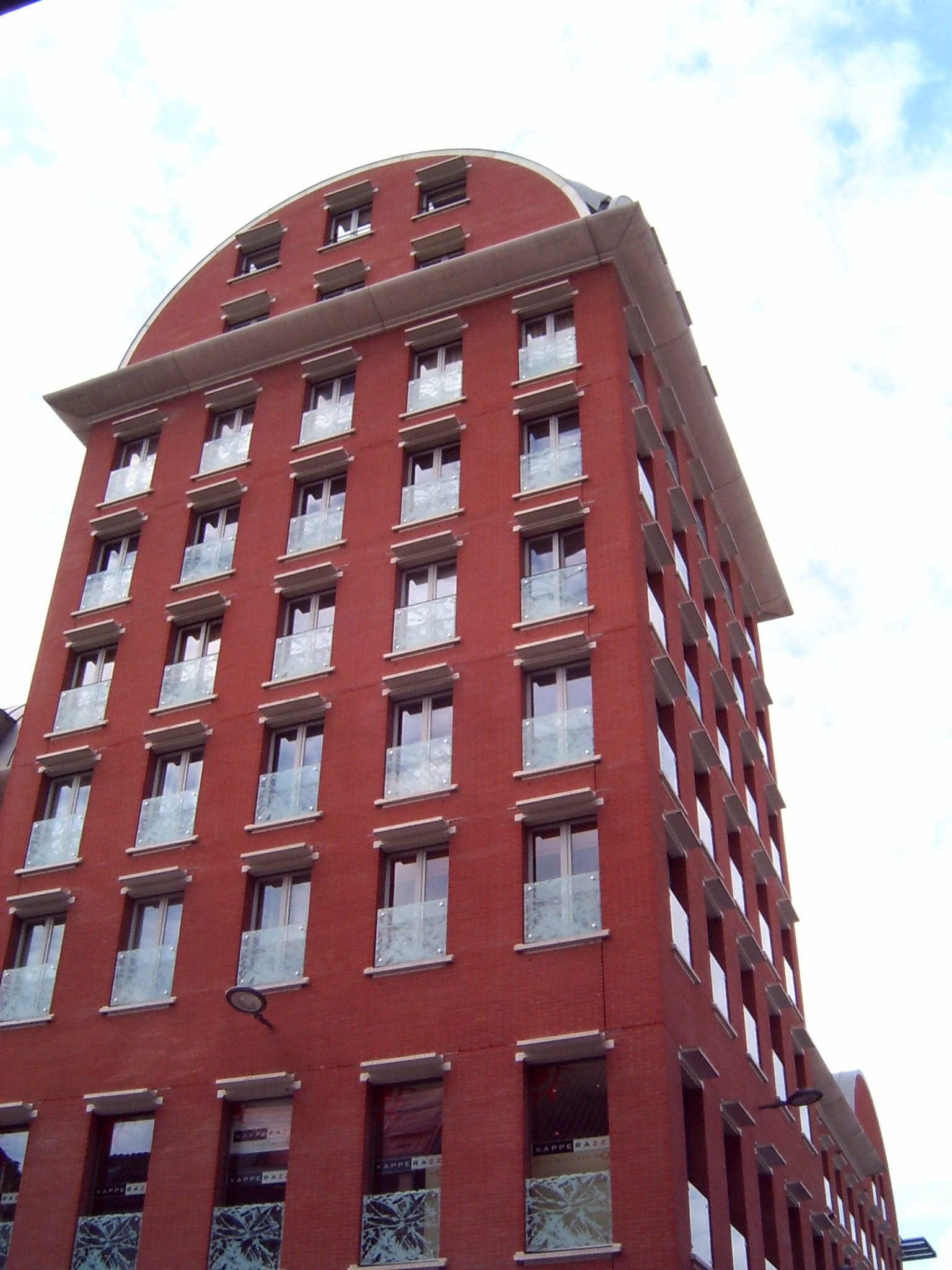
Statenplein, Dordrecht

== See also ==
- Lucien Kroll

== Literature ==
- Charles Vandenhove: Art in Architecture. Ludion, Ghent 2005, ISBN 90-5544-546-0
- Bart Verschaffel: Charles Vandenhove: Projects/Projecten 1995-2000. NAi Publ., Rotterdam 2000, ISBN 90-5662-181-5
- Geert Bekaert and others: Charles Vandenhove : art and architecture. Renaissance du Livre, Tournai 1998, ISBN 2-8046-0012-2
- Geert Bekaert: Charles Vandenhove, 1985-1995. NAI Uitg., Rotterdam 1994, ISBN 90-72469-72-0
- Pierre Mardaga: Charles Vandenhove: Une architecture de la densité. Liège 1985, ISBN 2-87009-231-8
