= Lucien Kroll =

Belgian architect (1927–2022)

- Born: 13 March 1927
- Died: 1 August 2022 (aged 95); Brussels
- Occupation: Architect
- Buildings: La Mémé, Oury House, Rénovation of Perseigne ZUP

Lucien Kroll (13 March 1927 – 1 August 2022) was a Belgian architect. With his wife, Simone Kroll, he founded the Atelier d’Architecture Simone & Lucien Kroll. They are considered to be the founders—as early as 1960—of participatory architecture, a consultative and immersive approach to the design of the built environment. Kroll's idiosyncratic style, closely tied to the participatory design process, was the antithesis of the modernist movement. He completed more than 100 projects.

== Biography ==
Kroll was born in Brussels on 13 March 1927. His father was an engineer and his mother, a nurse.

In 1945, Lucien Kroll enrolled at the Saint-Luc School in Liège, where he befriended Charles Vandenhove. In 1948, they both went on to continue their training at ENSAV de la Cambre in Brussels (today the Faculty of Architecture of the Free University of Brussels). He was also a student at the International Higher Institute of Applied Urbanism.

After obtaining his degree in architecture at La Cambre in 1951, Kroll worked with architect Charles Vandenhove for several years.

In 1956, Kroll met Simone Pelosse, the "ceramist of Old Lyon", at an exhibition in Brussels. Born in Lyon, trained at the School of Arts et Métiers de Paris, Simone Pelosse was, at that time, already established as a recognized ceramist. She is also politically active in the preservation of her neighborhood in the historic district of Lyon. Kroll visited her several times in Lyon before declaring his love. They became design partners and married in 1965.

Together, they founded the Atelier d'architecture Simone & Lucien Kroll, which was very active in the 1960s and 1990s. During these years Lucien Kroll and his wife fought particularly hard against their designated enemy: modernism and its functionalist deviations. Kroll often referred to himself as an « anarchitect » because of his stated desire to embrace the complexities and contradictions of the communities his architecture served, rather than to serve the plans of governmental or economic powers. Kroll's architectural style involved the use of vernacular building materials and a juxtaposition of forms that gives rise to built environments that look more like they are the product of the incremental development of a village than that of a master-planned city.

Kroll's success was followed by a long period where his architecture was decidedly out of fashion. Retrospectives organized in Nantes (2013), Paris (2015) and Brussels (2016) have helped to rekindle interest in their work.

== Philosophy of architecture ==
Critical of the authoritarian relationship between architect and user, Kroll developed a unique approach to the practice of architecture. Throughout his career, Kroll opposed the industrialization of housing and promoted an architecture that is adapted as closely as possible to the self-expressed needs of the inhabitants, even when there were contradictions and difficulties of communication. He is thus against "disciplinary alignment" and sought to liberate architecture by means of consultative, immersive and inter-disciplinary methods. The architecture produced can therefore only be collective and participatory. This participatory concept focuses on the human in the projects and casts the architect not as decision-maker, but as a mediator. This involved direct contacts with the future users of the project with a view to determining their wants and concerns. In applying the methods of participatory architecture, called "incrementalism" by Kroll, architects are to consult, bring together, immerse themselves in neighborhoods and rely on the expertise of psychologists, sociologists, ethnologists and pedagogues.

== Projects ==
=== The Oury House ===
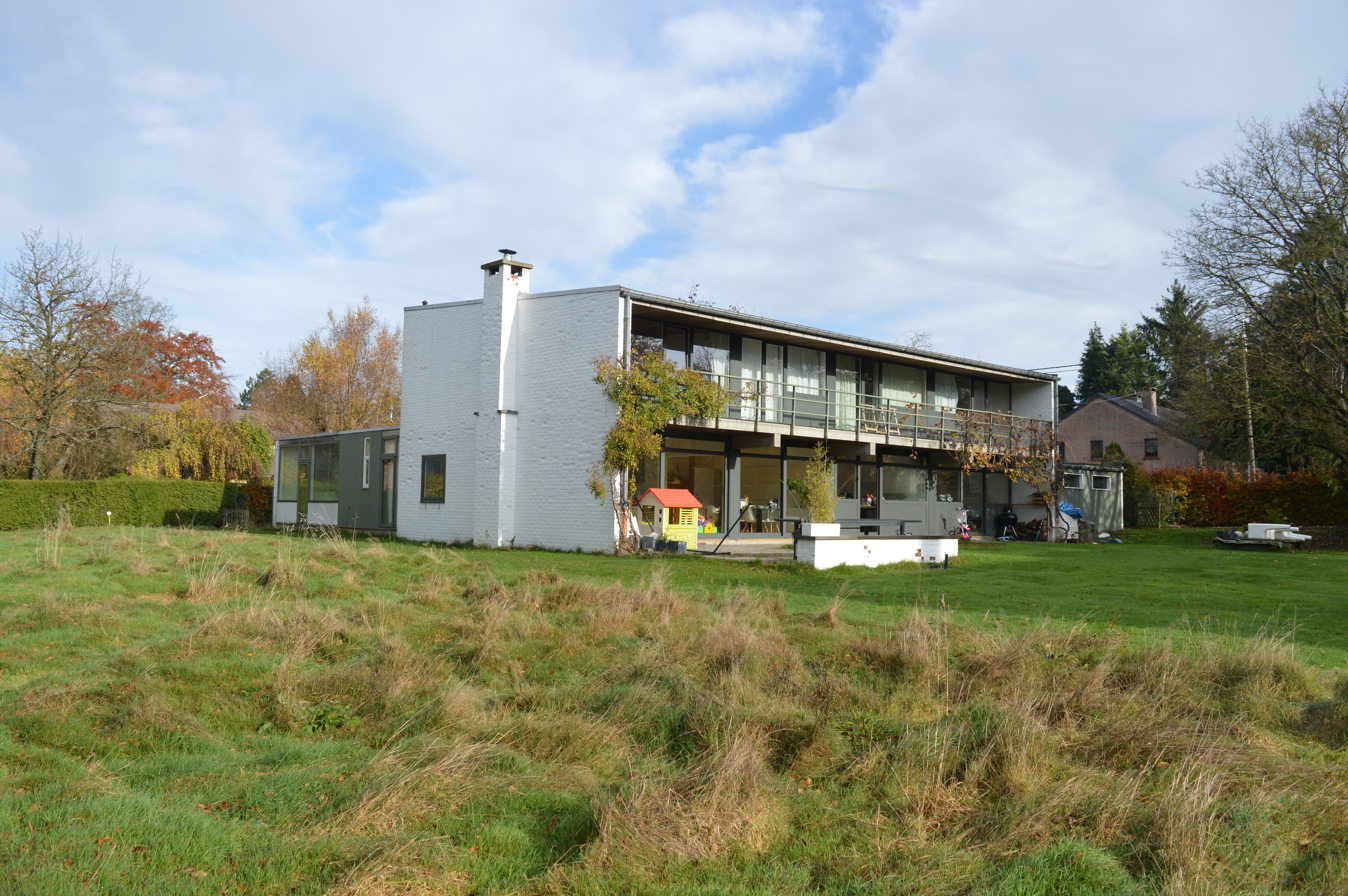
View of the Oury House from the garden

One of his first works is the Oury house, a single-family dwelling located at 137 Voie de Liège in Embourg. It was built between 1962 and 1963 for Mr. Oury, a former wood importer. Wood was also the material of choice for the house, but brick and concrete were used for the load-bearing walls, which form four regular spans. The L-shaped plan of the house opens to the south, while the staircase and the corridors which distribute the rooms are to the north. The balcony, as well as the overhanging roof, help to prevent overheating in the summer months.

=== La Mémé ===
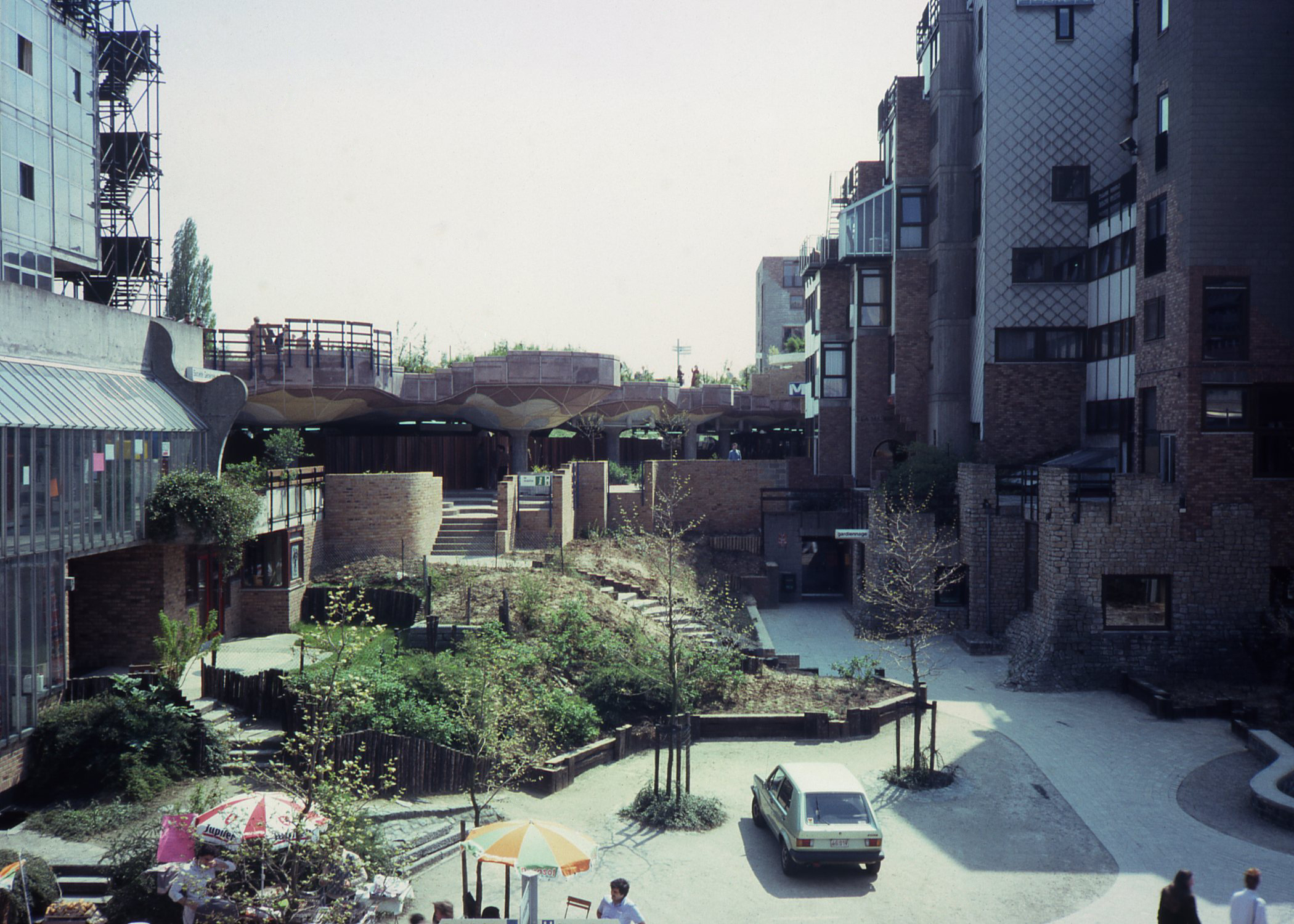
Metro Alma station, part of the University of Louvain complex

Kroll's most famous work is La Mémé—the building complex for the Medical Faculty at the University of Louvain, Belgium, built between 1970 and 1976. This project was born in the particular socio-political context of tensions between the Flemish- and French-speaking communities, which ultimately required the French-speaking university to leave Leuven. The relocated school of medicine was to be based in Woluwe-Saint-Lambert in Brussels. At the same time, the university felt the impact of the student uprisings of 1968, notably when the student body insisted that they be allowed to choose the architect for the Woluwe-Saint-Lambert campus. They chose Atelier Kroll.

True to his philosophy, Kroll included the students (and others, including construction workers) in the development of the project, and, as always, based his architecture on listening to and taking their views into account. For this program, which covers nearly 4 hectares, the Kroll Atelier asked the landscape architect, Louis Le Roy, to develop the site, which is entirely pedestrian.

The Mémé itself is highly idiosyncratic, involving a vast number of building materials (slate, brique, wood) and a complex, almost fragmented, facade. The buildings "aroused widespread controversy in the early 1970s (and even today) due to its their fragmented and improvisational appearance—the result of a deliberate participatory design process—in stark contrast to the adjacent massive and repetitive hospital, the embodiment of a centralized bureaucracy."

=== ZUP Perseigne ===
In 1978, Kroll was hired by the city government of Alençon, a French city in Normandy with a base population of 33,000 people. Kroll was to fill the role of consulting architect for the restructuring and renewal of the public spaces in the ZUP of Perseigne. ZUP is the French acronym for Priority Urbanisation Zone. The Perseigne ZUP was a very large, low income housing development built over the 1963–1969 period with units designed to house 6,500 inhabitants in 2300 dwellings. The Perseigne development was typical of many built during France's post-War housing construction drive.The inhabitants of the ZUP were initially rural families who had moved to the city and, later, immigrants from such countries as Algeria, Morocco, Portugal, Spain and Turkey. The site of the ZUP was adjacent to a household appliances factory (Moulinex) and employment tended to be either in blue collar jobs or in low paid office work.

Prior to Kroll's involvement in the project the Brazilian sociologist, Arlindo Stefani spent 4 months embedded in the ZUP and helping its inhabitants to formulate their ideas on how to improve it. Later the urbanist, Jean-Jacques Argenson, who both lived and worked in the ZUP, continued consultations with inhabitants. This proved to be an essential input for Kroll, who was only present on the site two times per month. These consultations resulted in landscapes (planted buttes) that eased problems of speeding cars and parking lots designed to respect the principle of "two trees for one car". Kroll and others also rethought the pre-existing design for a middle school, siting it centrally within the ZUP (not in a separate site for schools), a change that enhanced foot traffic through the ZUP. Along with a new community center, the school also helped to form a central plaza where the weekly farmers' market was held. These changes helped to establish a community center for the ZUP. Kroll also built extensions on top of and next to existing buildings that drew inspiration from the design of regional dwellings.

== Selected works ==
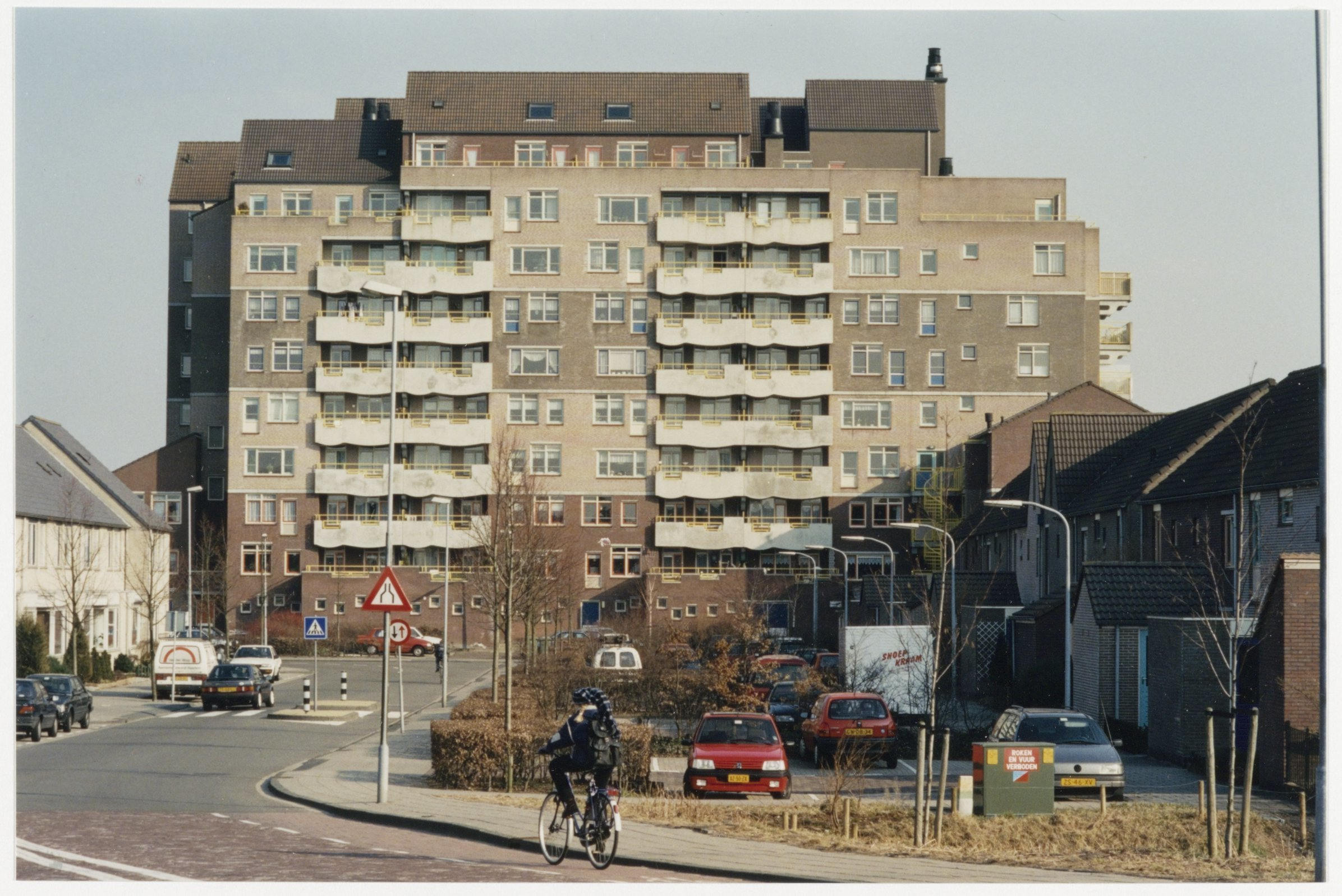

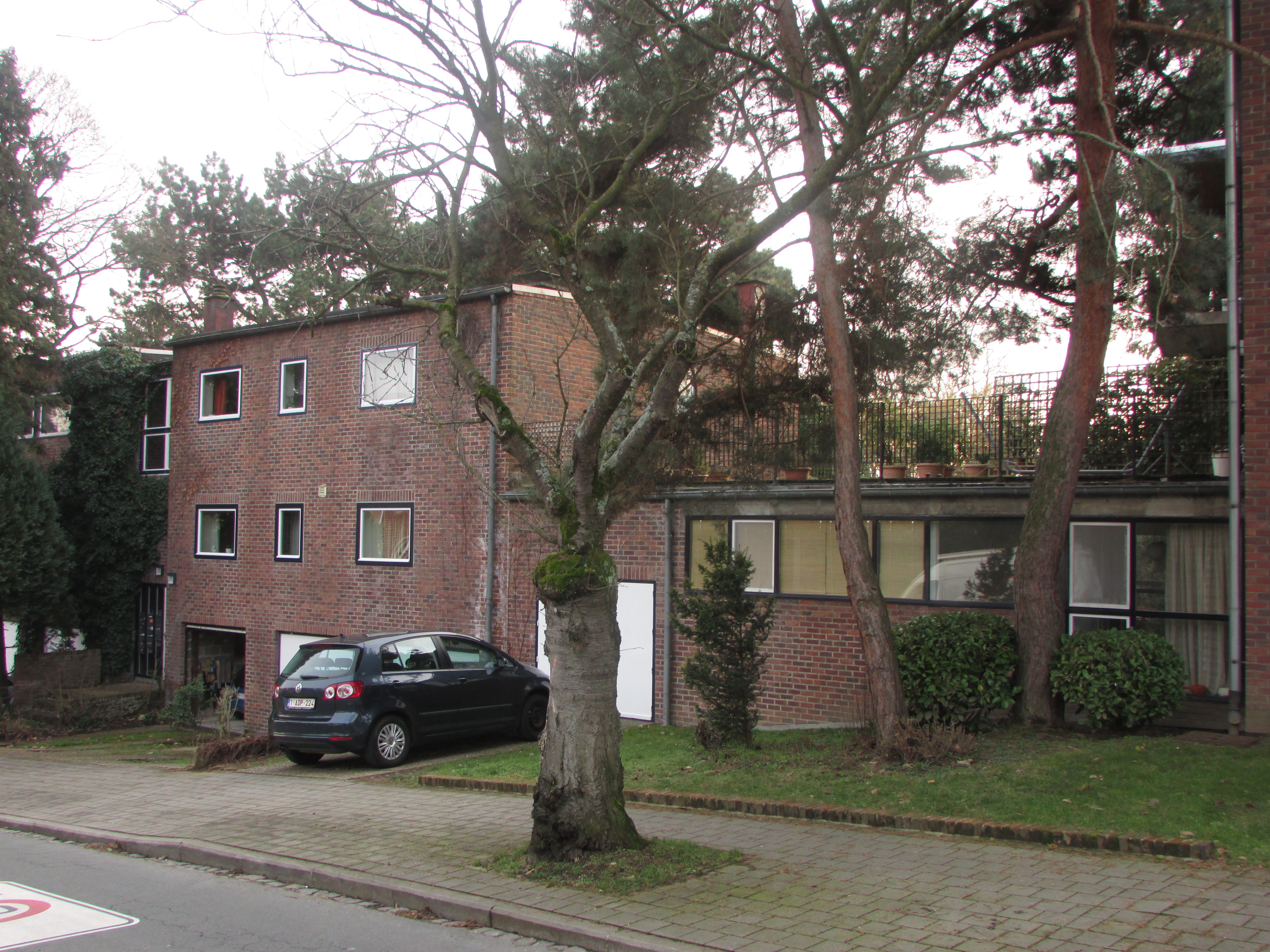

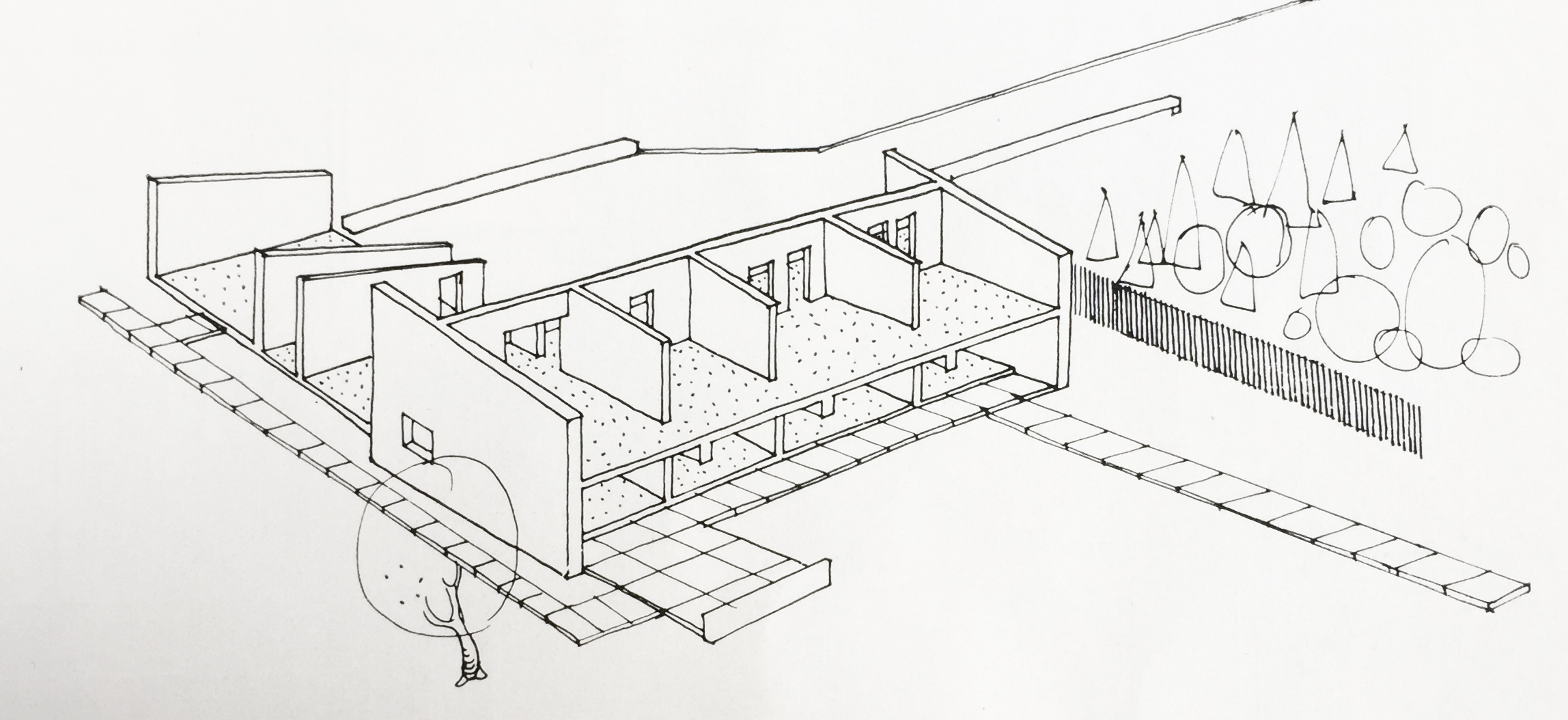

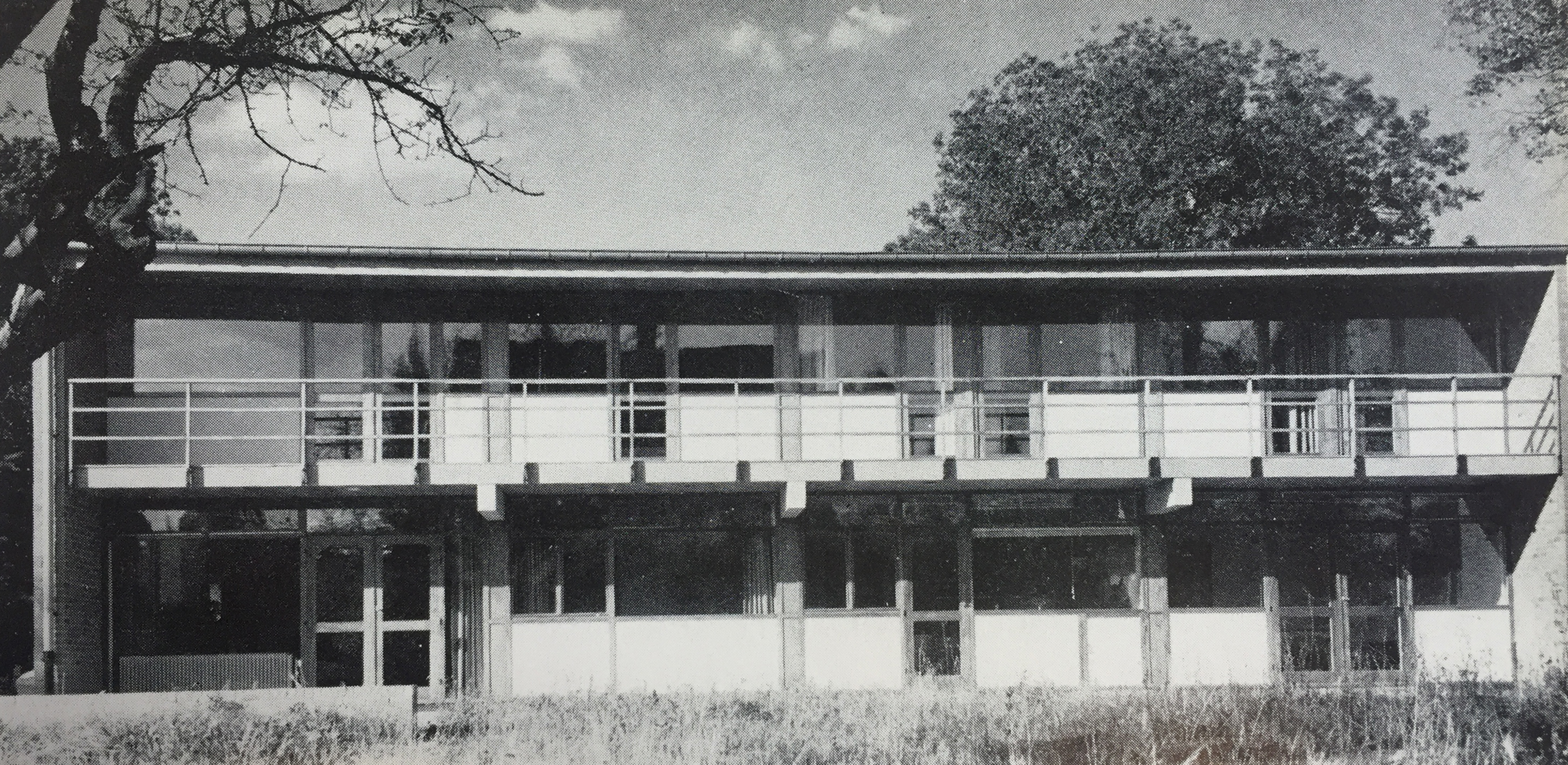
Southern facade of the Oury House

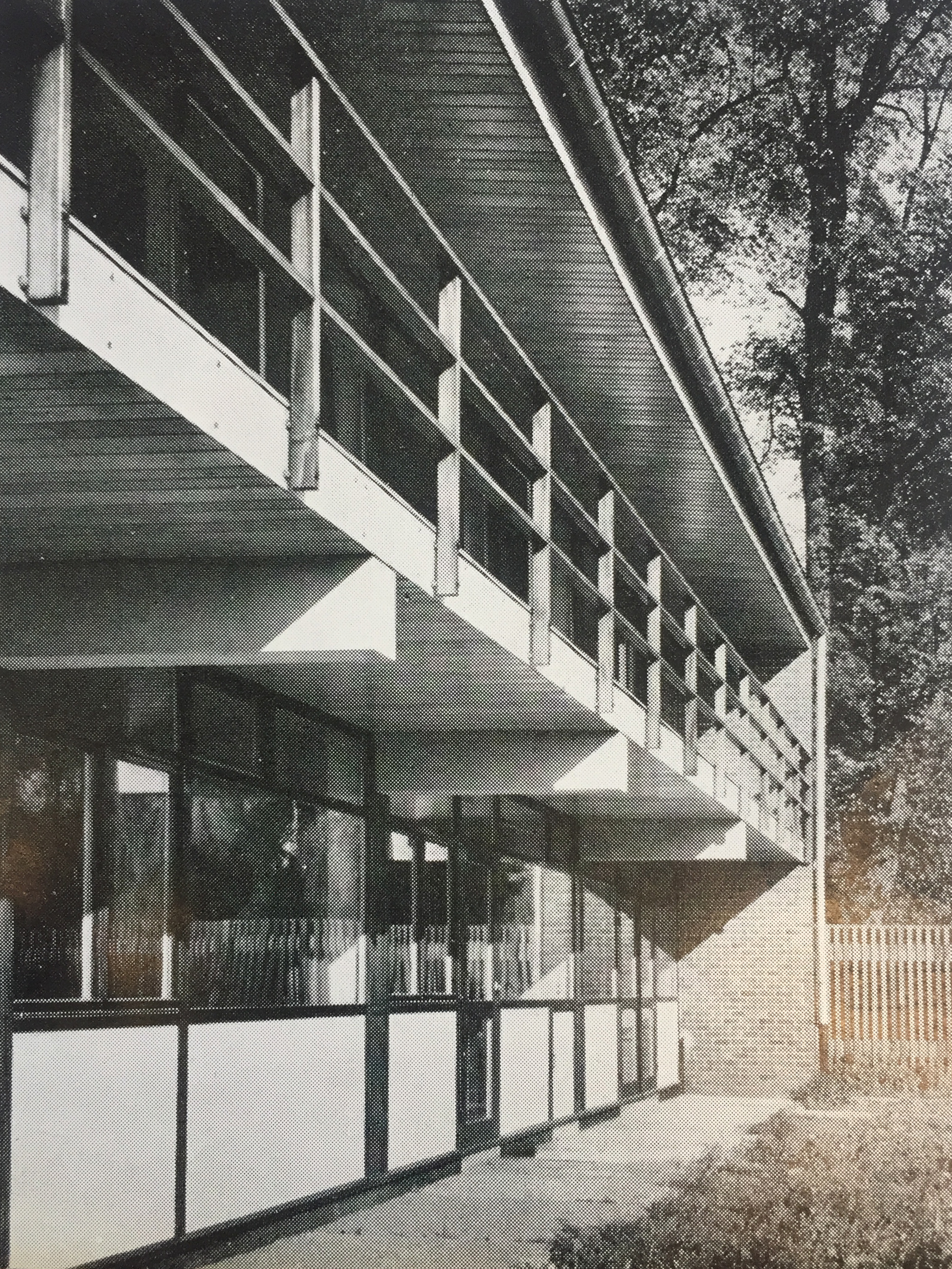
Détail of the southern facade of the Oury House
