= Kermisgasten =

1936 film

- Directed by: Jaap Speyer
- Written by: Alexander Alexander (scenario), Rido (dialogue)
- Release date: 13 February 1936
- Running time: 90 minutes
- Country: Netherlands
- Language: Dutch

Kermisgasten is a 1936 Dutch film directed by Jaap Speyer.

== Plot ==
Jan Holst and his wife Truus were once renowned stage actors, but after a while they ended up in Marinelli's circus tent, where Jan's sister Annie has been working as a circus artist for many years. When Truus is tired of Jan's philandering with other girls, she accepts an offer from a theater agent from the city and leaves Jan and his sister. Marinelli, however, struggles with financial difficulties and Jan and Annie are soon fired, ending up at the same theatre as Truus. There they become understudies for the famous American 'Jolly Sisters', who are quarantined on their ship. Unbeknownst to them, Jan and Annie also came into possession of the stolen jewels of the Jolly Sisters. The sisters have sent two detectives after the jewels, who upon arrival at the theater immediately fall in love with Jan dressed as a Jolly Sister. While Jan and Annie get ready for their first performance, one of the detectives decides to visit their dressing room and present his crush with a bouquet of flowers. The detectives then discover that the woman they adore is in fact a grown man who shaves his legs. Assured that they have caught the jewel thieves, the armed detectives turn up in the prompter's booth while Jan, dressed as Marlene Dietrich, performs the song 'Ich binvon Kopf bis Fueneingestellen'. The artists flee through the audience, and a chase over the rooftops of Amsterdam ensues. Eventually the company accidentally ends up in the room where at that very moment Marinelli's brother, Mr. Jansen, is being questioned by the police in the presence of the real Jolly Sisters. Jansen confesses to the crime and Annie and Jan return the jewels, receiving a hefty reward.

== Cast ==
- Heintje Davids as Annie
- Johan Kaart as Jan
- Fien Berghegge as Truus (as Fientje Berghegge)
- Matthieu van Eysden as Marinelli
- Sylvain Poons as Detective 1
- Johan Elsensohn as Detective 2
- Alex De Meester
- Jan Grootveld
- Harry Boda
- Jean Janssen
- Wim Kan
- Corry Vonk
- August Kiehl
- Charles Braakensiek
- Clara Vischer-Blaaser
- Piet Te Nuyl
