= The Crosspatch =

De Kribbebijter
- Directed by: Henry Koster and Ernst Winar
- Written by: Alexander Alexander; Jane Bess; Louis De Bree (additional dialogue); Max Reimann (play); Otto Schwartz (play)
- Starring: Cor Ruys; Louis de Bree; Philip Dorn; Dolly Mollinger; Mary Dresselhuys; Louis Borel; Chris Baay; August Kiehl; Sien de la Mar-Klopper
- Cinematography: Henk Alsem
- Music by: Max Tak
- Release date: August 8, 1935
- Running time: 86 minutes
- Country: Netherlands
- Language: Dutch

The Crosspatch (Dutch: De Kribbebijter) is a 1935 Dutch film directed by Henry Koster and Ernst Winar. It is based upon the German three-act play "Willis Frau" ("Willy's Wife") by Max Reimann and Otto Schwartz.

== Plot ==
In a Dutch mansion lives Baron van Hergershuizen, a quick to anger man who has tantrum after tantrum. Among the residents is his daughter Mary, who is in love with Hans van Maren; a twitchy young man her father despises. Mary gets into a fight with Van Maren when the latter doesn't dare to stand up for himself in front of her father. The baron's son Willy does not reside in Hergershuizen Mansion, since the baron disowned and disinherited him for marrying Loes, a bourgeois girl who works as a typist. Willy is searching for a job in order to prove that he can get by without his father's help.

Mary decides to sneak out of the palace and pay Willy a visit on his wedding anniversary. She finally gets to meet Loes, who has given up her job as a typist to become a housewife. Although they have only just met, Loes makes sure that Mary reconciles with Van Maren. On the same day, Mary and Van Maren get engaged.

When the baron discovers that his son has a job in an office, he gets furious and has him fired immediately. When Loes is informed of this, she refuses to fall silent on the matter and decides to visit the palace and speak to her father-in-law. The baron however, never having actually seen his daughter-in-law, mistakes her for the new housekeeper. Before she can explain who she actually is, good-hearted uncle Moeki jumps in and confirms that she will indeed do the house-keeping in the palace, introducing her as 'Louise Hildebrand'. Loes decides to take part in the plot and win the heart of her father-in-law. Slowly but surely, the baron becomes attached to his new housekeeper.

Meanwhile, Willy wonders why his wife has been away for so long and returns to the mansion for the first time in years. At first the baron is furious, but when Moeki pretends to him that Willy has been abandoned by his wife, his anger quickly turns to joy. The baron reconciles with his son and announces that he will settle the divorce. He also wants to marry off his daughter to odd mr. Schimmelman. He invites him to ask what he thinks about it, but Schimmelman takes the baron's words differently and thinks he wants to offer him kitchen maid Katrien.

Not much later the true housekeeper arrives, forcing Loes to reveal her true identity. The baron is not angry, but happy to learn that his beloved housekeeper is really Willy's wife. He is, however, less pleased to learn of Mary's engagement to Van Maren...

== Cast ==
- Cor Ruys ... Baron Coenraad 'Kribbebijter' van Hergershuizen
- Louis De Bree ... Uncle Moeki
- Philip Dorn ... Willy van Hergershuizen
- Mary Dresselhuys ... Mary van Hergershuizen
- Dolly Mollinger ... Loes
- Louis Borel ... Hans van Maren
- Chris Baay ... Schimmelman
- August Kiehl ... Frans
- Sien De la Mar-Klopper ... Katrien
- Mary Smit ... Roos

== Production ==
=== Pre-production ===
In January 1935, Holfi (Hollandsche Film-industrie), the recently established Dutch subsidiary of Universal Film Agency, announced plans to film Max Reimann's popular play. A month later it was announced that director Herman Kosterlitz was committed as a director. Stage actress Mary Dresselhuys was asked to audition for the lead role, but the test recordings were disastrous; Kosterlitz did not find her was photogenic enough and told her: 'Leider gnädige Frau, sind Sie nicht zu fotografieren' ('Unfortunately, dear madam, you are impossible to photograph'). Since advertisements with her name had already been placed in the newspapers, she was offered the significantly smaller role of Mary instead. The experience scarred Dresselhuys for life; she would only accepted a handful of film roles in her life. After this, theatre star Lily Bouwmeester auditioned, but she too was rejected by the director after a test recording. The names Cissy van Bennekom and Magda Janssen were also mentioned at an early stage. The role eventually went to Dolly Mollinger, an unknown and inexperienced secretary who was discovered by accident when cameraman Henk Alsem - in the absence of director Haro van Peski, for whom she was working at the time - filmed test shots for her.

In March 1935 a decision by the Dutch National Employment Office caused difficulties; conditions were set regarding the cooperation of the foreign director and a cameraman, and objections were raised against the granting of permits for three other foreign workers. In response, Holfi threatened to shoot the film abroad. The Dutch Cinema Association (Nederlandse Bioscoopbond or NBB) discussed the matter with the Dutch Minister of Social Affairs and Employment on Wednesday 3 April.

=== Filming ===
Shooting began in April 1935 at Cinetone Studios and lasted for only thirteen days. Exterior scenes were shot at Landgoed Duin en Kruidberg in Velsen.

=== Music ===
Max Tak, the best-known Dutch film composer at the time, provided the score. At an early stage operetta-composer Paul Abraham was set to write the score, but the negotiations broke down.

== Distribution ==
=== Theatrical Release ===
The Gala Premier took place on August 8, 1935 in the Passagetheater in The Hague; a week later than planned because of renovation work delays. Mayor Salomon Jean René de Monchy of The Hague and multiple prominent members of the Netherlands Red Cross board attended the premiere, and afterward Mary Dresselhuys, Dolly Mollinger, Philip Dorn, Chris Baay and August Kiehl appeared on stage. That day marked Kiehl's sixtieth anniversary as a stage actor, for which he received a speech by Van Dorn. The proceeds of the event were donated to the Red Cross.

Soon after, on August 27, the movie premiered in Indonesia—even before the Amsterdam premiere. Cor Ruys attended the screening at the prestigious Maxim-theater of Surabaya. In the Amsterdam 'Cinema Royal' popular Dutch cabaret artist Louis Davids opened the screenings on multiple occasions.

In April 1936 'Vereniging Neerlandia', a London-based social and cultural club aimed at Dutch expats, held a special screening of De Kribbebijter. The screening was such a success, that the London Academy Theatre on Oxford Street decided to show the film as well. A nationwide release followed in August 1936, making it the first Dutch film to receive a British release.

During the 2020 online edition of the German Cinefest, with the theme 'Kino, Krieg und Tulpen' (Film, War and Tulips), the film was shown with German subtitles under the title Der Griesgram. In November 2021, the film was screened live for the first time in years by Leiden-based study association Nieuw Nederlands Peil.

=== Home media ===
In 2007, De Kribbebijter was released by TDM Entertainment on a one-disc standard DVD in the Netherlands as part of the "Dutch Classics" series of the Nederlands Filmmuseum.

== Reception ==
Dutch audiences loved the comedy; for seven years, until December 1942, the film played in all cinemas in the country. The Dutch press was also enthusiastic: performances and direction received favourable reviews, and over all the film was seen as a big step forward compared to the popular but rather wacky ‘Jordaan films’.

While British audiences were equally enthousiastic (the Manchester Guardian reported a great many "bursts of laughter"), reactions of the international critics were mixed. Writing for The Spectator in 1936, Graham Greene gave the film a relatively poor review. While noting there were some funny scenes, Greene took especial umbrage with the direction, which he described as "that grim slow kind which never shows you a car without following it to the horizon or lets a character leave one room for another without a prolonged study of opening and closing, and then reopening and re-closing doors, with a glimpse of the passage perhaps as well, lest the imagination should bear too heavy a burden". Arthur Vesselo of Sight & Sound also criticised the direction, noting faults in construction and weak transitions, but stated that these minor faults were redeemed by the cast: "The chief factor on the other side is the acting, which, coming from a cast of practised stage-players, is often witty."
