= Paul Haenen =

Dutch comedian and voice actor

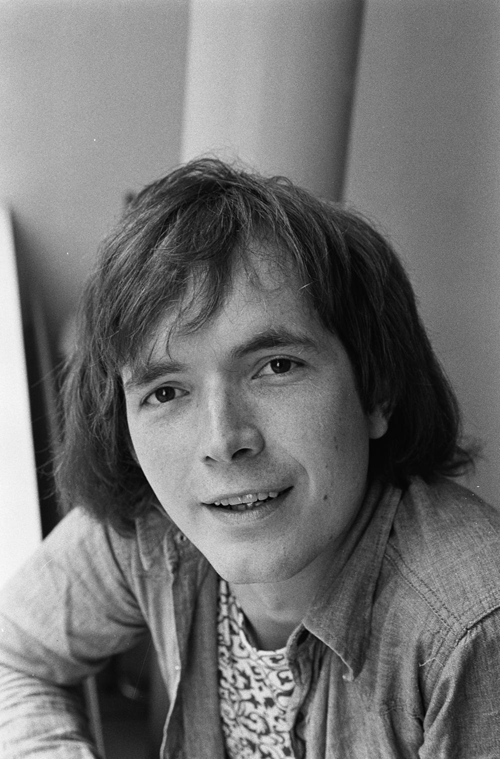
- Paul Haenen (1974)
- Born: January 30, 1946 (age 80); Amsterdam, Netherlands
- Occupation: Voice actor

Paul Haenen [pɔɫ 'haːnə(n)] (born 30 April 1946) is a Dutch comedian and voice actor.

== Career ==
In his alter ego of Father Gremdaat, Haenen explains and criticises the Nashville Statement on Dutch TV (2019). English subtitles.

Paul Haenen is a well-known comedian in the Netherlands and also provides the voices of Bert, Grover and other minor characters on Sesamstraat, the Dutch co-production of Sesame Street, since Sesamstraat's first season in 1976. Wim T. Schippers is responsible for his counterpart Ernie. Haenen also translates many of the American Sesame Street songs into Dutch so that they can be used in the Dutch version of the show.

It is told that Jim Henson was so impressed by the performances of Haenen and Schippers, that they are the only Bert and Ernie in the world who are allowed to write their own material. Subsequently, Haenen and Schippers have recorded a whole series of self written Bert and Ernie record albums, and they also appear as Bert and Ernie in interviews. Haenen was also the voice of Edna Mode in the Dutch version of The Incredibles.

Haenen uses several other alter egos in his comedy performances, most notably Margreet Dolman (a likeable woman of middle age with remarkable optimism, but lacking knowledge of technology) and clergyman Father Gremdaat (Dominee Gremdaat, who preaches like a pastor about what is wrong with society, and how people should behave instead, with a number of standard expressions).
