= August Kiehl =

Dutch stage actor

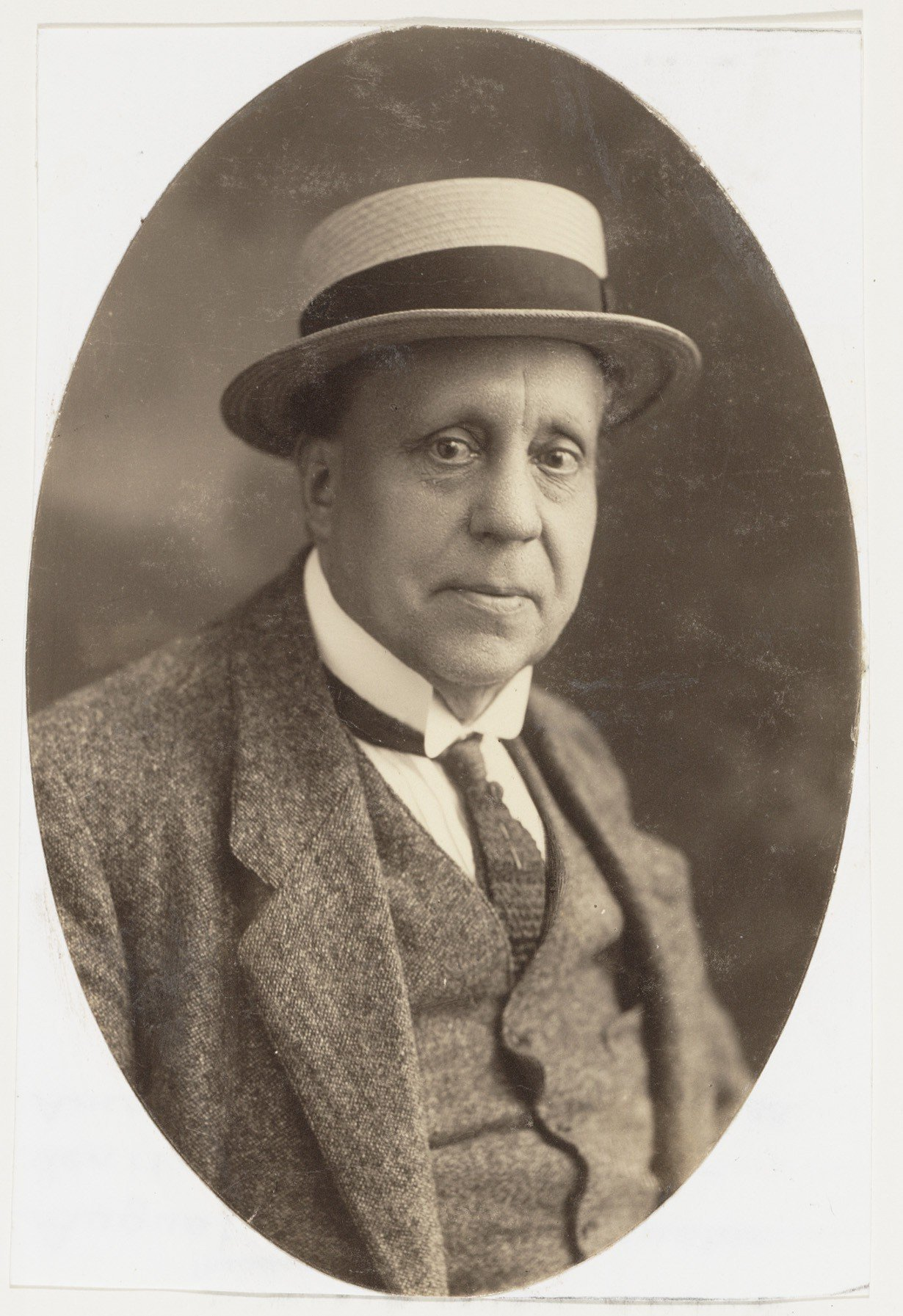
- Born: August Theodoor Cornelis Kiehl; 26 October 1854; Amsterdam, Netherlands
- Died: 23 November 1938 (aged 84); Amsterdam, Netherlands
- Other names: Guus Kiehl
- Occupations: Actor, director, playwright
- Years active: 1875–1938
- Spouse: Griet Hieselaar (m. 1880)
- Children: 2
- Relatives: Suzanna Sablairolles (aunt); Wilhelmina Sablairolles (aunt)

Signature
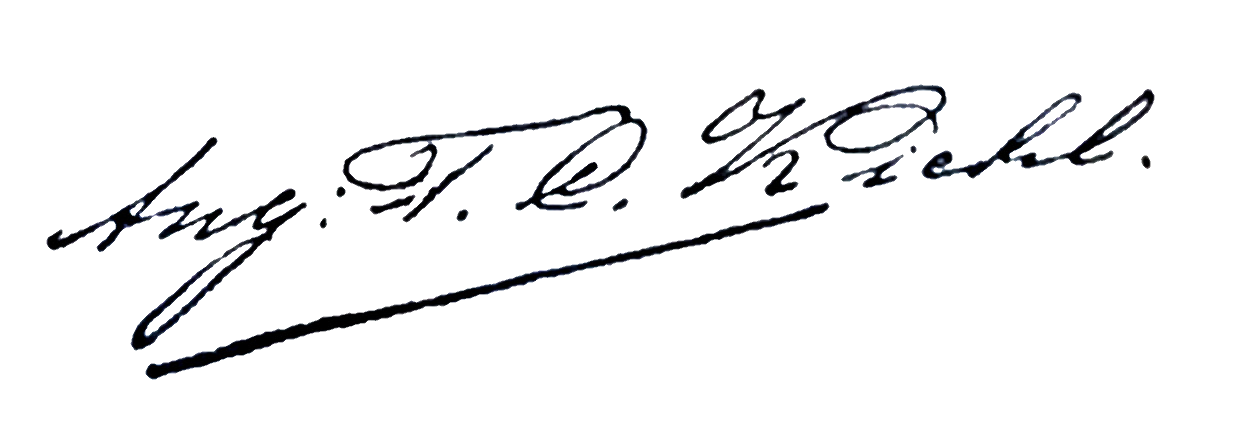

August Theodoor Cornelis Kiehl (26 October 1854 – 23 November 1938), also known as Guus Kiehl, was a Dutch actor, director and playwright. He is best known for his successful career as an actor in operetta theatre, his original operetta De Parel van Zaandam (The Pearl of Zaandam) and his performances in several Dutch films in the 1930s.

== Biography ==
Kiehl came from a family of actors; his parents H.G. Kiehl and Sophie Sablairolles were stage actors in The Hague. After several failed attempts at becoming a sailor, a cook and a cigar shop clerk and a disastrous audition at the conservatory in The Hague, Kiehl finally made his stage debut as La Flèche in Molière's The Miser on 21 February 1875 at the company of his cousin Valois. Soon after he moved to Amsterdam, where he joined the company of Gustave Prot and Frans P. Kistemaker. There he had his first big successes as an operetta comedian in adaptations of The Three Musketeers, Sherlock Holmes and The Bells of Corneville among others. At Prot & Kistemaker he would frequently team up with Johannes Philip Kelly and Bart Kreeft, who became known as the Three K's.

Kiehl would go on to join a large number of companies, among which the Artisschouwburg (where he wrote and directed what might be the most successful original Dutch operetta ever written: De Parel van Zaandam which garnered rave reviews and was due to be staged in London) the opera department of Royal Theater Carré and the company of Louis Bouwmeester in the Paleis voor Volksvlijt. He remained productive until a very old age and even starred in several feature films, collaborating with internationally acclaimed film directors like Henry Koster and Jaap Speyer.

== Filmography ==
- Op hoop van zegen (1934) - Jantje
- The Crosspatch (1935) - Frans
- Kermisgasten (1936)
- Oudjes (1936) - Guus Mulder
