= Koninklijke Schouwburg =

Theater in The Hague, Netherlands

Royal Theater
- Koninklijke Schouwburg
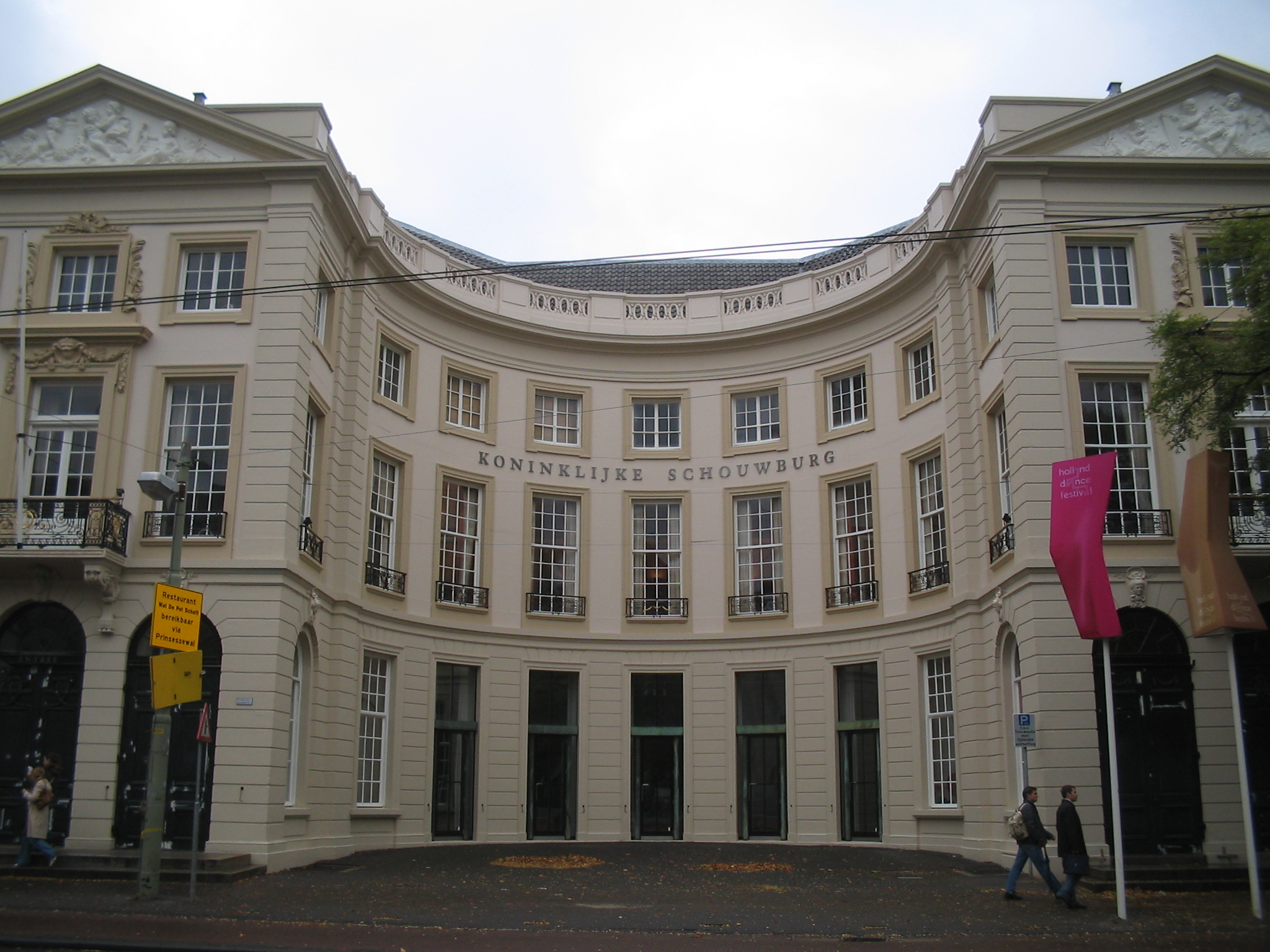
- Interactive map of Royal Theater
- Former names: Nieuwe Haagse Stadsschouwburg
- Address: Korte Voorhout 3, The Hague
- Coordinates: 52.082139°N 4.315464°E
- Owner: Municipality of The Hague
- Capacity: 680

Construction
- Groundbreaking: 1766
- Built: 1766 (Palace); 1802-1804 (Theater)
- Opened: 1804
- Renovated: 1863 (modernization); 1911-1914 (removation theater hall); 1929 (removation stage); 1997-1999 (general renovation)
- Architects: Pieter de Swart; Johan van Duyfhuis; Willem Cornelis van der Waeyen Pieterszen; J.J. Gort; Charles Vandenhove

Tenant
- Het Nationale Theater

Website
- www.hnt.nl

The Koninklijke Schouwburg (literally translated: Royal Theater or Royal Playhouse) is a theater in the city center of The Hague. The theater was built in 1766 and has been in use as theater since 1804. From 2017 it is one of the theaters in use by the national theater company Het Nationale Theater, but also other companies perform in the Schouwburg.

The main room of the Schouwburg is relatively small for current standards, and can seat 680 people in total with the main room and three balconies. The stage has a 1929 antique revolving stage that is still functional but no longer in use. It is considered one of the most prestigious theaters in the country.

== Little city palace ==
In 1766 Charles Christian, Prince of Nassau-Weilburg, brother in law of stadtholder William V, ordered the construction of a little city palace at the Korte Voorhout for his 23 year old wife Princess Carolina of Orange-Nassau and himself. He gave the assignment to Pieter de Swart, who studied for two years in Paris, paid for by stadtholder William IV. De Swart was also responsible for several other prominent buildings in The Hague, such as the former Royal Library, the Lange Voorhout Palace and the Lutheran church. De Swart drafted a design in neo-Louis XIV style (Note: Other sources refer to it as a Louis XVI style or 'between Louis XV and Louis XVI style'.) for a 77 meter wide and three stories high building around a semicircular cour d'honneur. At the front of the building, from left to right, a billiard room, bed room, cabinet and antichambre would be located. At the garden side of the building, a music hall, ballroom and party room would be located, with five goblins on the walls. He also made designs for two canapés, 18 gilded fauteuils and five bronze wall chandeliers. The curtains were to be made out of damask.

In 1769, Charles Christian moved to Weilburg, where Carolina died in 1787. This removed urgency from his side to finish the city palace. In 1774 part of the palace was finished, but architect de Swart died the previous year. The building could not be finished, and the designs were auctioned off. Because of the Batavian Revolution and the following French occupation, the building had to be stopped.

After Charles Christian died, his heirs sold all his possessions in The Hague, except for this unfinished palace. It remained empty and unfinished for a long time, and it was decided to tear it down, just before a group of citizens from The Hague rented it for 99 years to turn it into a theater. To test the structural integrity of the building, a regiment of soldiers with full packing was ordered to walk on the balconies; the building was determined to be sufficiently stable and it could be turned into a theater.

== Schouwburg ==
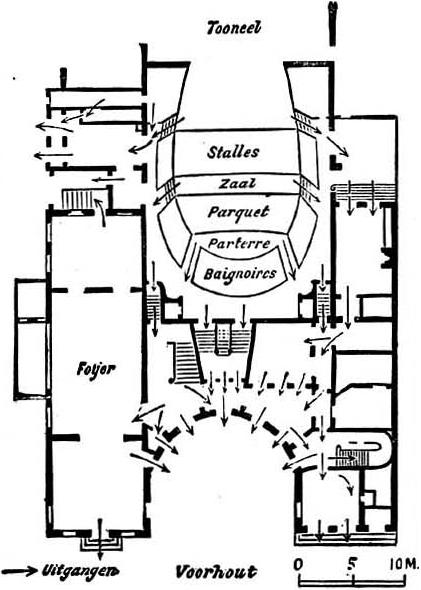
Map from 1891

Theater was not a novel sport in The Hague, but was always performed 'on location': where-ever it suited. Some permanent smaller theaters have been located around the city, but were considered too shabby to deserve the name 'theater'. The city palace was renovated by architect Johan van Duyfhuis and on 30 April 1804 the Nieuwe Haagse Stadsschouwburg (New City Theater of The Hague) opened its doors. Initially the theater was rented to theater companies by the evening, but in 1813 the traveling company of Ward Bingley became the permanent occupant. In 1815 this company was permitted to change its name to Koninklijke Zuid-Hollandsche Tooneelisten (Royal South-Holland Actors), a company that would exist until around 1875.

In 1830 the Schouwburg was sold to the municipality of The Hague, which sold it to King William II in 1841 and bought it back in 1853 from his heirs. Under the King's ownership, the French opera and Dutch theater bloomed in The Hague. Opera was performed most frequently, almost exclusively in French. In 1863 the interior of the theater was modernized by architect W.C. van der Waeyen Pieterszen. This was also when the letters 'SPQH' were added to the front of the building, referring to the phrase Senatus Populusque Hagensis (Government and People of The Hague).

== Closure, renovation and revival ==
In 1901 the city council of The Hague decided to close the theater because of unsafe fire conditions. This triggered an intense debate in the city on whether or not to keep the Koninklijke Schouwburg, the so-called Schouwburg-quaestie (the matter of the Theater) that was eventually decided in favor of the proponents of renovating the Koninklijke Schouwburg. The theater was closed for a decade and rigorously renovated by City Architect J.J. Gort, completely overhauling the interior of the building around the theater room.

The theater room itself was provided with a new, lively decorated, ceiling that was painted by Henricus Jansen and further decorated with a colossal chandelier in the secession style. After World War I, permanent companies were assigned to play in the Koninklijke Schouwburg. The first company was contracted in 1921: the Haghespelers in 't Voorhout of Eduard Verkade. Because Verkade mostly brought progressive theater and didn't succeed in warming up the audience to the same, his company was replaced in 1924 by the Vereenigd Rotterdamsch-Hofstad Tooneel of Cor van der Lugt Melsert.

In 1929 the backside of the building was extensively renovated, a stage tower was installed to make it possible to hoist up decors and the dressing rooms were modernized. In 1938 the Vereenigd Rotterdamsch-Hofstad Tooneel fell apart, and the then recently founded Residentie Tooneel (Residence stage company) was appointed as their successor. Literary matinees became more common, where a guest speaker would discuss a literary topic, illustrated by actors who would recite scenes from plays, prose and poetry. A youth company was founded to perform plays for schools.

During 1940-1945 (World War II), the name of the theater was changed by the German occupying force to Stadsschouwburg (City Theater). After a while the theater was appointed as the home theater for the Deutsches Theater in den Niederlanden (German: German Theater in the Netherlands), which forced the Residentie Tooneel to move to the Princesse Schouwburg. These changes were reverted after the war.

When the board of the Residentie Toneel quit in 1947 after an internal conflict, the Haagse Comedie (Comedy Company of The Hague) was selected as the new company to call the Koninklijke Schouwburg their home. They developed their own style, and in 1988 it was reformed into the Nationale Toneel (National Stage Company).

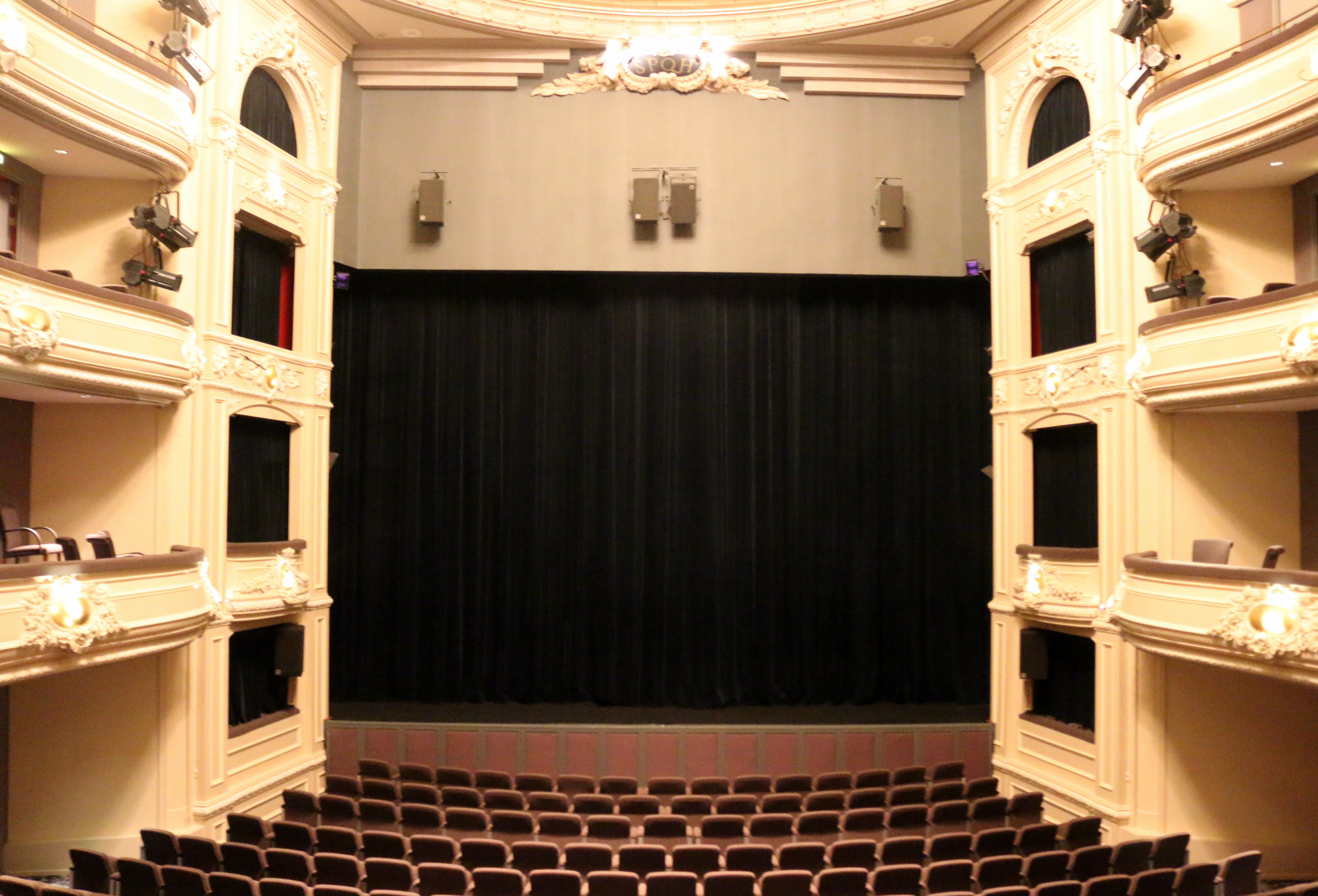
Interior of the Koninklijke Schouwburg (2014)

== Renovation ==
In 1992, a glass building was attached to the left side of the building with the ticketing desks, designed by the Belgian architect Charles Vandenhove. In 1997-1999 the Koninklijke Schouwburg was again extensively renovated - in part to guarantee fire safety. The municipality of The Hague, the owner, paid 31 million guilders to make the necessary changes designed by Vandenhove. The stairways were considered dangerous, and replaced by two main stairways fully made out of glass on both sides of the main hall. An elevator was installed for visitors, technical facilities were modernized, ventilation was improved and new chairs with more leg space were installed.

On 18 September 1999 the Koninklijke Schouwburg was reopened by the alderman Louise Engering, followed by the premiere of "Oude Mensen" by the Nationale Toneel (directed by Ger Thijs). In 2006/2007 new halls/rooms were added at the back of the building for practice, offices and workshops.

In 2017, the Nationale Toneel merged with Theater aan het Spui, another major stage company in The Hague, to Het Nationale Theater - which plays in multiple theaters across the city, including the Koninklijke Schouwburg. The three salons at the first floor at the front of the building are in use as salon and can be rented separately.
