= Scared to Death (1947 film) =

1947 film by Christy Cabanne

- Original 1947 theatrical release poster
- Directed by: Christy Cabanne
- Written by: W.J. Abbott
- Based on: play Murder on the Operating Table by Frank Orsino
- Produced by: William B. David
- Starring: Bela Lugosi; George Zucco; Nat Pendleton; Molly Lamont
- Cinematography: Marcel Le Picard
- Edited by: George McGuire
- Music by: Carl Hoefle
- Production company: Golden Gate Pictures
- Distributed by: Screen Guild Productions
- Release date: February 1, 1947 (United States)
- Running time: 65 minutes
- Country: United States
- Language: English
- Budget: $135,000 (estimated)

Scared to Death is a 1947 American gothic thriller film directed by Christy Cabanne and starring Bela Lugosi, George Zucco, Nat Pendleton and Molly Lamont. The picture was filmed in Cinecolor. The film is historically important as the only color film in which Bela Lugosi has a starring role. Lionel Atwill was originally intended to appear in the film but he was too ill to work, so George Zucco replaced him in the cast. Christy Cabanne completed the film in early 1946, but it was not screened until 1947.

== Plot ==
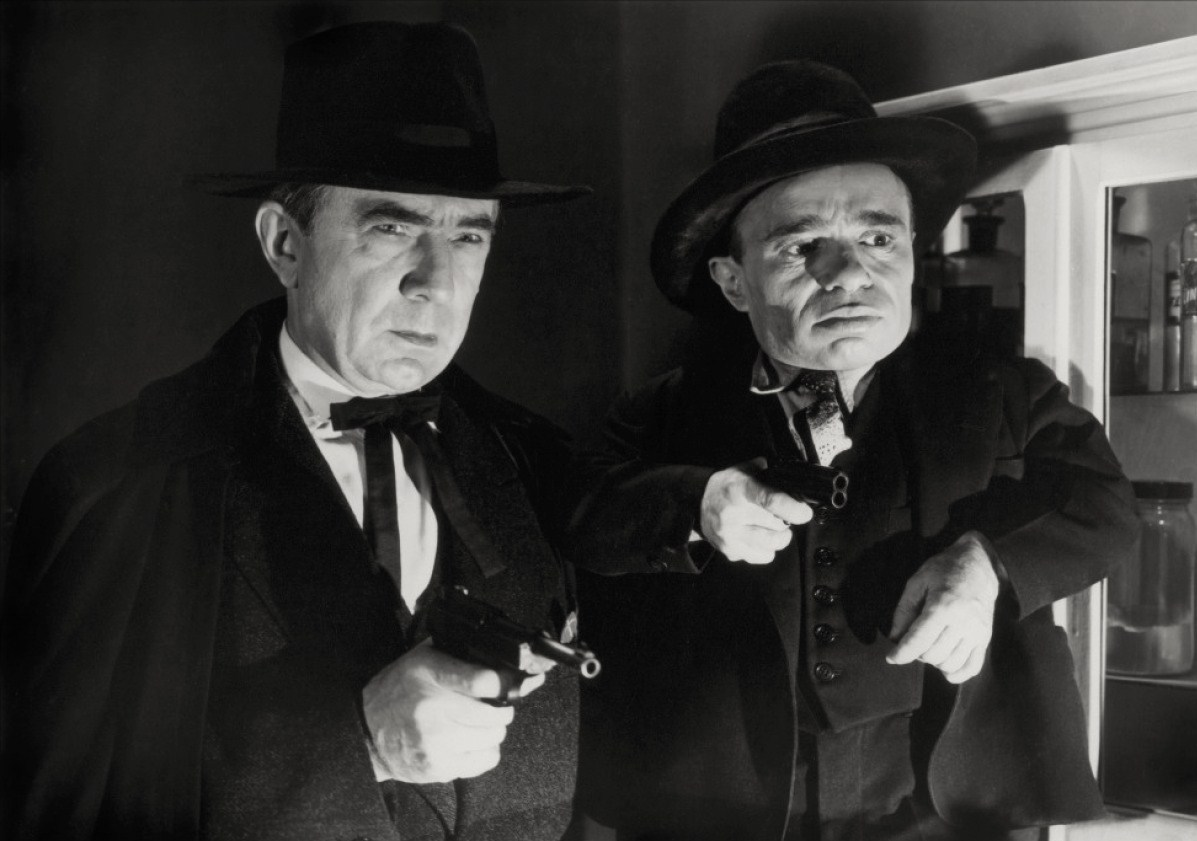
Lugosi and Rossitto

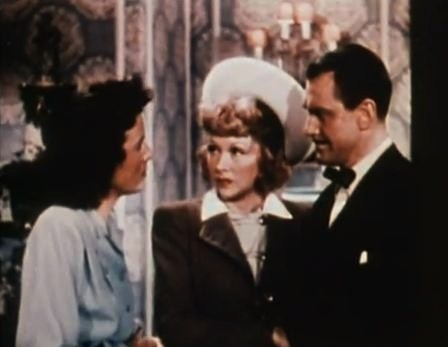

The film opens with the disclosure by morgue examiners that a beautiful woman has literally died of fright. The plot reveals how she reached the fatal stage of terror.

The woman is married to the son of a doctor, the proprietor of a private sanatorium, where she is under unwilling treatment. Both the son and the doctor indicate they want the marriage dissolved, but the woman refuses. Arriving at the scene is a mysterious personage, Prof. Leonide, identified as the doctor's cousin who had been a stage magician in Europe. He is accompanied by a threatening dwarf, Indigo.

After it is apparent that the wife is terrified of the foreigners, it is disclosed that she is the former wife and stage partner of a Paris magician known as René, who was believed to have been shot by the Nazis. Attempts to draw a confession that she had betrayed her magician husband and had collaborated with the Nazis led to the use of a device employing a death mask of the supposedly dead patriot, which literally frightens her to death.

Although the young newspaperman hero and his sweetheart guess the answer to the story, they allow the diagnosis "scared to death" to stand.

== Cast ==
- Bela Lugosi as Prof. Leonide
- George Zucco as Dr. Joseph Van Ee
- Nat Pendleton as Bill Raymond
- Molly Lamont as Laura Van Ee / Laurette La Valle
- Joyce Compton as Jane Cornell
- Gladys Blake as Lilybeth
- Roland Varno as Ward Van Ee
- Douglas Fowley as Terry Lee
- Stanley Andrews as Pathologist
- Angelo Rossitto as Indigo
- Lee Bennett as Rene
- Stanley Price as Autopsy Surgeon

== Production ==
The film was based on a one-act play which in turn was based on a 1933 murder case involving Dr. Alice Wynekoop.

The film was announced in March 1946 as Accent on Horror. The Autopsy was another title that was considered.

== Reviews ==
Historian Gary Don Rhodes commented that although the film was in color, "nothing manages to stave off the inevitable boredom. Critics found the film confusing, dull....Very possibly this remains Lugosi's worst horror film."
