= The Return of the Vampire =

1943 horror film starting Bela Lugosi

- Theatrical release poster
- Directed by: Lew Landers
- Written by: Randall Faye; Griffin Jay; Kurt Neumann
- Produced by: Sam White
- Starring: Bela Lugosi; Frieda Inescort; Nina Foch; Miles Mander; Roland Varno; Matt Willis
- Cinematography: L. William O'Connell
- Edited by: Paul Borofsky
- Music by: Mario Castelnuovo-Tedesco
- Production company: Columbia Pictures
- Distributed by: Columbia Pictures
- Release date: November 11, 1943
- Running time: 69 minutes
- Country: United States
- Language: English

The Return of the Vampire is a 1943 American horror film directed by Lew Landers and starring Bela Lugosi, Frieda Inescort, Nina Foch, Miles Mander, Roland Varno, and Matt Willis. Its plot follows a vampire named Armand Tesla, who has two encounters with Englishwoman Lady Jane Ainsley, the first taking place during World War I, and the second during World War II.

The Return of the Vampire is not an official sequel to the 1931 Universal Pictures film Dracula (which starred Lugosi as the eponymous vampire), but the film has been interpreted by cultural historian David J. Skal as an unofficial follow-up, with Lugosi's character renamed only because the film was not produced by Universal.

== Plot ==
During World War I, the vampire Armand Tesla stalks London. His latest victim is admitted to the clinic of Lady Jane Ainsley and her colleague, Professor Walter Saunders. They are baffled by what they regard as a severe case of anemia. The vampire infiltrates the clinic; unable to finish his previous victim because she had died from shock, he preys on Prof. Saunders' granddaughter Nicki instead. Saunders comes to believe that both patients are victims of a vampire. He shows Lady Jane puncture marks on their necks. He and Lady Jane search a nearby cemetery for the vampire's crypt. Upon finding Armand Tesla in his coffin, a mirror held to his face reveals no reflection---proving to Professor Saunders and Lady Jane that Tesla is indeed a vampire. A werewolf assisting Tesla tries to prevent their intervention but does not succeed. Once the vampire is spiked, the werewolf, Andréas, is cured of his curse. He later becomes Lady Jane's assistant.

Twenty-four years later, Scotland Yard detective Sir Fredrick Fleet reads the deceased Saunders' account of these events. He informs Lady Jane that if the body they staked was alive at the time, she will be charged with murder. Lady Jane explains that the man they staked was an eighteenth-century vampire expert named Armand Tesla. Lady Jane tells her son, John, about the investigation. She is certain that Sir Frederick will find that Tesla's body has not decomposed, proving he was a vampire. She and John agree to keep this information from John's fiancée, Saunders' granddaughter Nicki, to avoid reawakening the trauma of her previous attack.

After a bombing raid, cemetery workers find Tesla's corpse exposed, with the metal spike still in his chest. Believing the spike to be bomb shrapnel, they remove it and reinter the body. Thus freed from death, the vampire regains power over Andréas and prepares to avenge himself on Lady Jane. Helpless to resist, Andréas murders Hugo Bruckner, a scientist who recently escaped from a concentration camp who had arrived in England to work with Lady Jane. Tesla intends to impersonate Bruckner. With Tesla's body missing, Sir Frederick closes his investigation for lack of evidence.

Lady Jane throws a party to celebrate John and Nicki's engagement. She discourages Sir Frederick from giving Saunders' manuscript to Nicki and locks it in a drawer. Tesla arrives as Bruckner and charms everyone except Sir Frederick. The manuscript is stolen and left in Nicki's room. She begins reading it and falls under Tesla's power. She is found the next morning unconscious with puncture marks on her neck.

Lady Jane questions the gravediggers, who tell her about the spiked body. She relates the story to Sir Frederick, who dismisses vampire stories as fantasy. He assigns two plainclothes men to shadow Andréas. They report seeing him transform into a werewolf, and recover a bundle containing the effects of the real Bruckner. Sir Frederick's suspicions grow when a laboratory analysis of the rifled drawer finds it to be wolf hair.

Tesla preys on John and convinces Nicki that she did it. John is found the next morning unconscious with puncture wounds. Nicki believes she has become a vampire. Sir Frederick corners Andréas for questioning, but as he begins to transform, Andréas escapes. Sir Frederick assigns plainclothes men to follow Tesla, but the vampire eludes them. Tesla threatens to turn Nicki and John into vampires. Lady Jane brandishes a cross, warning Tesla that the "power of goodness" can still destroy him. Tesla vanishes.

When Tesla commands Nicki to leave the house, Lady Jane convinces Sir Frederick that they must follow her. Nicki meets Tesla and Andréas at the cemetery during an air raid and faints. Andréas attempts to carry her to safety, but Sir Frederick shoots him. He and Lady Jane take shelter from the bombing. At the ruins of St. Mathias' church, Tesla abandons Andréas and tells him to die; Andréas crawls into a corner and hearing the words of Jane in his head, grabs a crucifix and is freed of the vampire's power. He attempts to destroy Tesla. A bomb strikes the church and knocks the two out. Andréas recovers and drags Tesla outside, where the rising sun's rays reduce the vampire to bones. Andréas dies of his bullet wound. Nicki tells Sir Frederick and Lady Jane that Andréas saved her life. Lady Jane tries again to convince Sir Frederick that Tesla was a vampire, but he refuses to accept her version of events without physical evidence. He asks his two deputies if they believe, to which they say yes. Astonished, he turns his head to the audience and asks, "And do you, people?"

== Cast ==
- Bela Lugosi as Armand Tesla
- Nina Foch as Nicki Saunders
- Roland Varno as John Ainsley
- Frieda Inescort as Lady Jane Ainsley
- Miles Mander as Sir Fredrick Fleet
- Matt Willis as Andreas Obry
- Ottola Nesmith as Elsa Walter
- Gilbert Emery as Dr. Walter Saunders
- Leslie Denison as Detective Lynch
- William Austin as Detective Gannett
- Jeanne Bates as Miss Norcutt (uncredited)
- Sharliee Collier as Nicki as a child (uncredited)
- Donald Dewar as John as a child (uncredited)
- Olaf Hytten as Ben (uncredited)
- Nelson Leigh as Assistant (uncredited)

== Production ==
Bela Lugosi's scenes were filmed in August and September 1943, prior to his final two Monogram films. This was also the last time he would receive top billing by a major Hollywood studio.

In his book Hollywood Gothic: The Tangled Web of Dracula from Novel to Stage to Screen, David J. Skal writes:

"Columbia Pictures hired Lugosi for Return of the Vampire, in which he played Dracula in all but name; for copyright purposes, the vampire's name was Armand Tesla."

== Release ==
The Return of the Vampire was released theatrically in the United States on November 11, 1943.

== Reception ==
At the time of the film's release, a critic from The New York Times wrote that nothing need be said about the film beyond its title and star to determine if one is interested in seeing it.

On review aggregator website Rotten Tomatoes, The Return of the Vampire has an approval rating of 75% based on eight reviews, with an average rating of 5.8/10. In 2006, Susan King of the Los Angeles Times called the film "underrated". In 2019, Stuart Galbraith IV of DVD Talk wrote, "For all its faults, The Return of the Vampire is as close as audiences got to see Lugosi reprise [his role as Count Dracula] (in all but name) in a straight horror film. And, low-budget though it is, the picture is in some respects more ambitious than Universal's sausage factory horrors, at least story-wise, and notable for its imitation-Universal look, a remarkable achievement for such a cheap film."

== See also ==
- Vampire film

== Sources ==
- Rhodes, Gary Don (2006). Lugosi: His Life in Films, on Stage, and in the Hearts of Horror Lovers. Jefferson, North Carolina: McFarland. ISBN 978-0-786-42765-9.
- Skal, David J. (2004). Hollywood Gothic: The Tangled Web of Dracula from Novel to Stage to Screen. New York: Faber & Faber. ISBN 978-1-429-99845-1.
