= Roland Varno =

American actor (1908–1996)

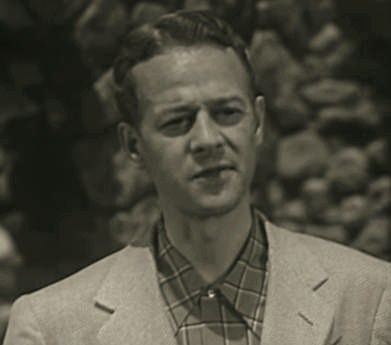
- Varno in Flight to Nowhere (1946)
- Born: March 15, 1908; Utrecht, Netherlands
- Died: May 24, 1996 (aged 88); Lancaster, California, U.S.
- Occupation: Actor
- Years active: 1929–1959
- Spouse: Elizabeth Alderson
- Children: 2

Roland Varno (born Jacob Frederik Vuerhard; March 15, 1908 – May 24, 1996) was a Dutch actor, who appeared mainly in German and American films.

== Early life ==
Varno was born Jacob Frederik Vuerhard in Utrecht in 1908. His father, Martin Fredrick Vuerhard, was a tea planter and his mother was a concert pianist. He spent much of his childhood in Java, then part of the Dutch East Indies.

After he graduated from college in Leiden, he traveled and continued to study dramatics. He worked in vaudeville, performing and designing scenery. For a time, Varno also supported himself as an illustrator for the newspaper Het Vaderland.

Varno was a polyglot fluent in at least seven languages: Dutch, English, German, Malay, Javanese, and Japanese.

== Career ==
In the late 1920s, Varno moved to Germany, at the time the hub of filmmaking in continental Europe. He appeared in various German silent and early sound films, most notably a supporting role in The Blue Angel with Marlene Dietrich and Emil Jannings. He went to Hollywood after a talent scout for MGM saw him in a German film in 1931. According to his daughter, he missed out a role in All Quiet on the Western Front because his ship was delayed.

He appeared in dozens of films in the 1930s and 1940s. He only appeared in three Dutch-language films during his career: De sensatie der toekomst (1931), Malle Gevallen (1934), and Het Meisje met de Blauwe Hoed (also 1934). During World War II, Varno's skill with languages saw him serve in the Office of Strategic Services. He also appeared in many war-time propaganda films, typically as a Nazi German officer or soldier. After the war, Varno appeared on various TV series including Space Patrol, the Adventures of Wild Bill Hickok and 77 Sunset Strip.

After retiring from acting in 1959, Varno moved to Ajijic, Mexico, where he ran a theatre company.

== Personal life ==
Varno was married to Elizabeth Alderson. They had two children, screenwriter and sound editor Martin Varno (known for writing the 1958 B-movie Night of the Blood Beast), and Marianna Jillian Varno.

=== Death ===
Varno died on May 24, 1996, in Lancaster, California.

== Partial filmography ==
- The First Kiss (1928) - Swimmer (film debut, uncredited)
- Ein kleiner Vorschuß auf die Seligkeit (1929) - Eton boy
- Zwischen vierzehn und siebzehn - Sexualnot der Jugend (1929) - Child
- Tragedy of Youth (1929) - Peter
- The Blue Angel (1930) - Gymnasiast Lohmann / Pupil
- The Man in Search of His Murderer (1931)
- Arsène Lupin (1932) - Jean Moucante (uncredited)
- As You Desire Me (1932) - Albert
- Private Jones (1933) - Lt. Brinkerhoff (uncredited)
- Malle Gevallen (1934) - Student Boy
- Het meisje met den blauwen hoed (1934) - Daantje
- Three Live Ghosts (1936) - German Corporal (uncredited)
- Sins of Man (1936) - Consul Clerk (uncredited)
- Quality Street (1937) - Ens. Blades (uncredited)
- The Woman I Love (1937) (uncredited)
- The Emperor's Candlesticks (1937) - Czar's Officer (uncredited)
- Conquest (1937) - Staos (uncredited)
- The Great Waltz (1938) - Orderly (uncredited)
- Gunga Din (1939) - Lt. Markham (uncredited)
- Balalaika (1939) - Lt. Nikitin
- The Fighting 69th (1940) - German Officer (uncredited)
- Zanzibar (1940) - Reporter (uncredited)
- Three Faces West (1940) - Dr. Eric Von Scherer
- Mystery Sea Raider (1940) - Lt. Schmidt
- Underground (1941) - Ernst Demmler
- Our Wife (1941) - Steward (uncredited)
- The Devil Pays Off (1941) - Ship's Doctor
- The Corsican Brothers (1941) - De Revenau's Friend at Opera (uncredited)
- Paris Calling (1941) - German Pilot (uncredited)
- Nazi Agent (1942) - Bauer (uncredited)
- To Be or Not to Be (1942) - Pilot (uncredited)
- Eagle Squadron (1942) - Aide-de-camp (uncredited)
- I Married an Angel (1942) - Man (uncredited)
- Desperate Journey (1942) - Unteroffizier (uncredited)
- Valley of Hunted Men (1942) - Carl Baum
- Hitler's Children (1943) - Lieutenant S.A. (uncredited)
- Edge of Darkness (1943) - German Lieutenant (uncredited)
- Action in the North Atlantic (1943) - Gunnery Captain (uncredited)
- Hostages (1943) - Jan Pavel
- The Return of the Vampire (1943) - John Ainsley
- Women in Bondage (1943) - Ernest Bracken
- Our Hearts Were Young and Gay (1944) - Pierre Cambouille (uncredited)
- The Unwritten Code (1944) - Cpl. Karl Richter
- Betrayal from the East (1945) - Kurt Guenther
- The Master Key (1945, Serial) - Arnold Hoffman - a.k.a. Hoff, M-3
- Three's a Crowd (1945) - Ronald Drew
- Paris Underground (1945) - Lieutenant Commander Stowe (uncredited)
- My Name Is Julia Ross (1945) - Dennis Bruce
- Follow That Woman (1945) - Minor Role
- Flight to Nowhere (1946) - James Van Bush
- Scared to Death (1947) - Ward Van Ee
- Letter from an Unknown Woman (1948) - Stefan's Second (uncredited)
- Act of Violence (1949) - German (voice, uncredited)
- Battleground (1949) - German Lieutenant (uncredited)
- Mask of the Avenger (1951) - Lieutenant (uncredited)
- Adventures of Wild Bill Hickok (1951-1952, TV Series) - Cleary / Clem (uncredited)
- Back at the Front (1952) - Smuggler Vishmirov (uncredited)
- Dangerous Assignment (1952) - Manter/Bela (uncredited)
- Space Patrol (1952-1953, TV Series) - Doc / Dr. S. Buehl (uncredited)
- The Mad Magician (1954) - Master of Ceremonies (uncredited)
- Topper (1954, TV Series) - Matre'd (uncredited)
- Public Defender (1954, TV Series) - George Morgan
- Cavalcade of America (1954) - Captain Von Holst
- Jump Into Hell (1955) - Col. Lonjunier (uncredited)
- Crusader (1955, TV Series) - MVD Man
- You Are There (1956, TV Series) - Lt. Gerhardt
- Science Fiction Theatre (1956, TV Series) - Scientist
- Istanbul (1957) - Mr. Florian (final film)
- 77 Sunset Strip (1959, TV Series) - Rolfe Berne (final appearance)
