= Fietje Peters, Poste Restante =

1935 film

- Directed by: Victor Janson
- Written by: Cor Hermus (dialogue), Dinah Nelken (scenario)
- Release date: 15 November 1935
- Running time: 80 minutes
- Country: Netherlands
- Language: Dutch

Fietje Peters, Poste Restante is a 1935 Dutch comedy film drama directed by Victor Janson.

== Cast ==
- Hilde Alexander
- Fien Berghegge ... Inez (as Fientje Berghegge)
- Louis Borel ... Vriend van Van Noort
- Dolly Bouwmeester ... Fientje Peters
- Alex De Meester
- Marie Faassen
- Cor Hermus ... Vader Van Noort
- Margot Hoppenbrouwers
- Rob Milton (as Robert Milton)
- Wim Poncia
- Jean Stapelveld
- Herman Tholen ... Van Noort
