= Anita Sharp-Bolster =

Irish actress (1895–1985)

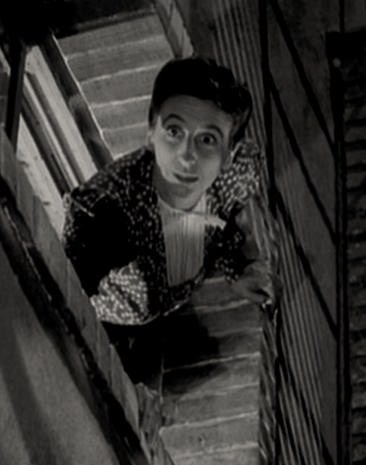
- Sharp-Bolster Scarlet Street (1945)
- Born: 28 August 1895; Glenlohane, Kanturk, County Cork, Ireland
- Died: 1 June 1985 (aged 89); Miami, Florida, U.S.
- Other name: Anita Bolster
- Occupation: Actress
- Years active: 1928–1977
- Spouse: Jacob Schwartz

Anita Sharp-Bolster (28 August 1895 – 1 June 1985) was an Irish actress who appeared in 88 films and 12 TV series from 1928 to 1978. She was sometimes billed as Anita Bolster.

== Early life ==
She was born 28 August 1895 in Glenlohane, Kanturk, County Cork, Ireland.

== Career ==
=== Stage ===
Sharp-Bolster's Broadway credits include Kathleen, Pygmalion, and Lady in Waiting.

=== Film ===
Sharp-Bolster debuted in the British film What Money Can Buy (1928). Her American film debut came in 1942 in Saboteur, directed by Alfred Hitchcock. In a 2013 book, one writer described her as "one of the most riveting human gargoyles in Hollywood films." She worked steadily in character roles throughout her movie career.

=== Radio ===
Sharp-Bolster worked with the BBC in the UK.

=== Television ===
Billed as Anita Bolster, she appeared in three episodes of Dark Shadows in March 1968. Bolster portrayed a witch named Bathia Mapes who failed to remove a curse of vampirism from Barnabas Collins.

== Personal life ==
Sharp-Bolster was married to Jacob Schwartz. She died in North Miami, Florida on 1 June 1985.

== Selected filmography ==
- What Money Can Buy (1928) - Cleaner
- S.O.S. (1928) - Mme. Karensky
- Would You Believe It! (1929) - Presbyterian
- Number, Please (1931)
- The Bells (1931)
- Mr. Bill the Conqueror (1932)
- Strip! Strip! Hooray!!! (1932) - Bit Part (uncredited)
- The Temperance Fete (1932) - Teacher
- Lassie from Lancashire (1938) - Woman in Audience (uncredited)
- The Villiers Diamond (1938) - Mlle. Dulac (uncredited)
- Saboteur (1942) - Lorelei - Circus Troupe
- This Above All (1942) - Tea Shop Customer (uncredited)
- I Married an Angel (1942) - Mrs. Kipper (uncredited)
- The Pride of the Yankees (1942) - Sasha's Mother (uncredited)
- Nightmare (1942) - Mrs. McDonald - Housekeeper
- Journey for Margaret (1942) - Woman with Cat (uncredited)
- London Blackout Murders (1943) - Mrs. Pringle
- Forever and a Day (1943) - Mrs. Garrow
- Flesh and Fantasy (1943) - Relative (uncredited)
- Thumbs Up (1943) - Mrs. Smithers, the Landlady (uncredited)
- Heaven Can Wait (1943) - Mrs. Cooper-Cooper (uncredited)
- Henry Aldrich Haunts a House (1943) - Mrs. Norris (uncredited)
- The Lodger (1944) - Wiggy - Barfly (uncredited)
- Passport to Destiny (1944) - Agnes
- Going My Way (1944) - Mrs. Hattie Quimp (uncredited)
- The White Cliffs of Dover (1944) - Miller (uncredited)
- The Doughgirls (1944) - Maid (uncredited)
- Our Hearts Were Young and Gay (1944) - Stewardess (uncredited)
- The Picture of Dorian Gray (1945) - Lady Harborough (uncredited)
- Kitty (1945) - Mullens
- My Name Is Julia Ross (1945) - Sparkes
- The Lost Weekend (1945) - Mrs. Foley
- Scarlet Street (1945) - Mrs. Michaels
- The Thin Man Goes Home (1945) - Hilda
- Dressed to Kill (1946) - Teacher on Museum Tour (uncredited)
- The Two Mrs. Carrolls (1947) - Christine
- Dark Passage (1947) - Woman (uncredited)
- Love From a Stranger (1947) - Ethel
- The Judge Steps Out (1947) - Martha, the Maid
- The Woman in White (1948) - Mrs. Todd
- The Perfect Woman (1949) - Lady Diana
- Saints and Sinners (1949) - (uncredited)
- Waterfront (1950) - Mrs. Simon (uncredited)
- Talk of a Million (1951) - Miss Rafferty
- Madame Louise (1951) - Cafe Proprietress
- Botany Bay (1952) - Moll Cudlip
- The Final Test (1953) - Daisy (uncredited)
- Raising a Riot (1955) - Mrs. Buttons
- The Hornet's Nest (1955) - Miss Anderson
- Reluctant Bride (1955) - Mrs. Fogarty
- Tears for Simon (1956) - Miss Gill
- The Rising of the Moon (1957) - Colonel Frobisher's Wife (2nd Episode)
- Stormy Crossing (1958) - First Nurse
- The Man Who Liked Funerals (1959) - Lady Hunter
- Alive and Kicking (1959) - Postmistress
- School for Scoundrels (1960) - Maid
- The Day They Robbed the Bank of England (1960) - Maid (uncredited)
- The House in Marsh Road (1960) - Mrs. O'Brien
- The Hands of Orlac (1960) - Volchett's Assistant (uncredited)
- Payroll (1961) - Landlady (uncredited)
- On the Beat (1962) - Hair-Salon Customer (uncredited)
- The List of Adrian Messenger (1963) - Mrs. Slattery (uncredited)
- Father Came Too! (1964) - Mrs. Trumper
- Promise Her Anything (1966) - Mrs. Egan - Baby Sitter (uncredited)
- The Boy Cried Murder (1966) - Mrs. Wetherall
- Craze (1974) - Woman at will reading. (uncredited)
- The Adventure of Sherlock Holmes' Smarter Brother (1975) - Old lady (uncredited)
- Jabberwocky (1977) - Old Crone / Woman with Stone (uncredited)

=== Television ===
- Educated Evans (1957, 1 episode)
- The Larkins (1959) as Gran Foskett in ep Total Welfare
- The Saint (TV show, Season 1, Episode 2, 1962) as Ada Harmer
- The Human Jungle (1963)
- Dark Shadows (1968, 3 episodes) as Bathia Mapes
- Jude the Obscure (1971) as Mrs Trott
- Skiboy (1973) as Mountain Witch
- Thriller (1976, 1 episode).
