= Louis Borel =

Dutch actor (1905–1973)

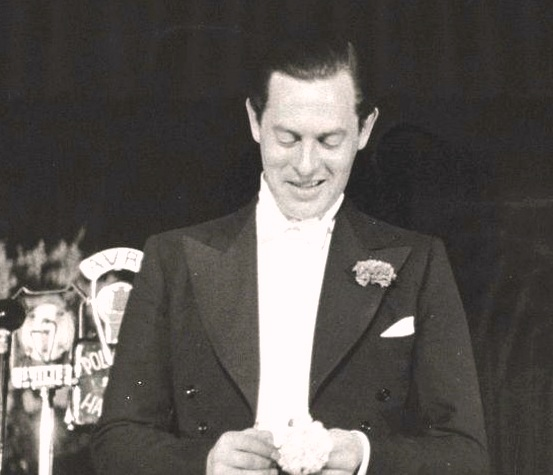
- Louis Borel in 1938
- Born: 6 October 1905; The Hague, South Holland; Netherlands
- Died: 24 April 1973 (age 67); Amsterdam, North Holland; Netherlands
- Other names: Lodewijk Borel; Louis Borell
- Occupation: Actor
- Years active: 1934 - 1973

Louis Borel (6 October 1905 – 24 April 1973) was a Dutch stage and film actor. During the 1930s, he appeared in a number of British films, such as the musical Head over Heels (1937). He later moved to the United States and worked in Hollywood.

== Filmography ==
Year	Title	Role	Notes
1934	Malle Gevallen	Student Hans	
1935	De Kribbebijter	Van Maren	
1935	Suikerfreule	Hans Vermeer	Uncredited
1935	Fietje Peters, Poste Restante	Mr. Willem van Scheltema	
1936	The Avenging Hand	Pierre Charrell	
1936	House Broken	Charles Delmont	
1937	Head over Heels	Marcel Larimour	
1938	Queer Cargo	Benson	
1939	Over the Moon	Pietro	
1939	De Spooktrein	Ted	
1940	Foreign Correspondent	Capt. Lawson	Uncredited
1943	London Blackout Murders	Peter Dongen	
1943	Paris After Dark	Picard	Uncredited
1943	The Iron Major	French Officer	Uncredited
1944	The Story of Dr. Wassell	Minor Role	Uncredited
1944	A Night of Adventure	Tony Clark	
1954	Désirée	Baron Morner	Uncredited
1955	The Purple Mask	Workman	Uncredited
1966	Murder in Amsterdam	Verkoper Blom	
1973	Because of the Cats	Antiquair	

== Bibliography ==
- Larkin, Colin. The Encyclopedia of Popular Music, Volume 4. Oxford University Press, 2006.
