= London Blackout Murders =

1943 film by George Sherman

- Theatrical release poster
- Directed by: George Sherman
- Screenplay by: Curt Siodmak
- Produced by: George Sherman
- Starring: John Abbott; Mary McLeod; Lloyd Corrigan; Lester Matthews; Anita Sharp-Bolster; Louis Borel
- Cinematography: Jack A. Marta
- Edited by: Charles Craft
- Music by: Mort Glickman
- Production company: Republic Pictures
- Distributed by: Republic Pictures
- Release date: January 15, 1943
- Running time: 59 minutes
- Country: United States
- Language: English

London Blackout Murders is a 1943 American crime film directed by George Sherman and written by Curt Siodmak. The film stars John Abbott, Mary McLeod, Lloyd Corrigan, Lester Matthews, Anita Sharp-Bolster and Louis Borel. The film was released on January 15, 1943, by Republic Pictures.

== Plot ==
A young girl, Mary Tillet, is forced to find a new place to live due to her London home being bombed during World War II. Her tobacconist landlord, Jack Rawling, tries to help her turn her new apartment into a home. Meanwhile, the newspapers are reporting news of the "London Blackout Murders," a murder spree being committed against a ring of suspected Nazi spies, and Mary must determine if her kind landlord is an assassin.

== Cast ==
- John Abbott as Jack Rawlings
- Mary McLeod as Mary Tillet
- Lloyd Corrigan as Inspector Harris
- Lester Matthews as Oliver Madison
- Anita Sharp-Bolster as Mrs. Pringle
- Louis Borel as Peter Dongen
- Billy Bevan as Air Raid Warden
- Lumsden Hare as Supt. Neil
- Frederick Worlock as Eugene Caldwell
- Carl Harbord as George Sandleigh
- Keith Hitchcock as Village Constable
- Tom Stevenson as Police Doctor
- Emory Parnell as Henryk Peterson
