= Suikerfreule =

- Directed by: Haro van Peski
- Written by: Walter Schlee, Haro van Peski
- Release date: 14 November 1935
- Running time: 90 minutes
- Country: Netherlands
- Language: Dutch

Suikerfreule is a 1935 Dutch film directed by Haro van Peski.

== Cast ==
- Johan Elsensohn ... Dirk van der Kooy
- Louis De Bree ... Schuit
- Annie Van Duyn ... Dolly van der Kooy
- Louis Borel ... Hans Vermeer
- Elias van Praag
- Mien Duymaer Van Twist
- Corry Vonk
