= Malle Gevallen =

1934 film

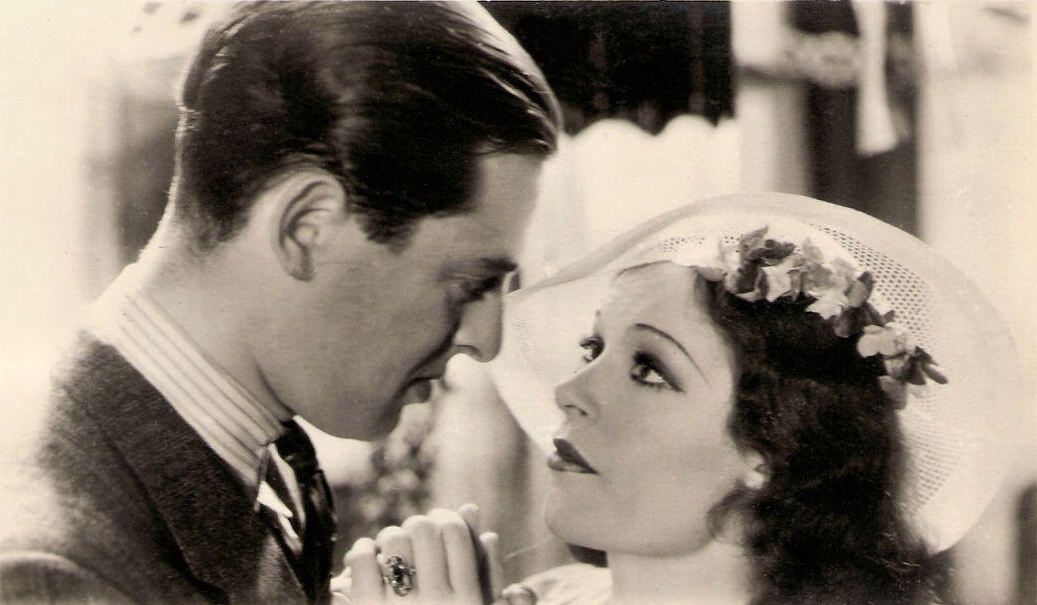
- Louis Borel and Jopie Koopman
- Directed by: Jaap Speyer
- Written by: Hans Martin
- Release date: 28 September 1934
- Running time: 94 minutes
- Country: Netherlands
- Language: Dutch

Malle Gevallen is a 1934 Dutch film directed by Jaap Speyer.

== Cast ==
- Johan Kaart as Student Bram
- Roland Varno as Student Boy
- Louis Borel as Student Hans
- Enny Meunier as School girl Kitty
- Annie van Duyn as School girl Toos
- Johanna Bernardina (Jopie) Koopman as Secretary Loeki
