= Tragedy of Youth =

1929 film

- Directed by: Adolf Trotz
- Written by: Adolf Lantz
- Produced by: Josef Stein
- Starring: Roland Varno; Eva Speyer; Jaro Fürth; Eberhard Mack
- Cinematography: Robert Lach; Erwin Lachs
- Music by: Werner Schmidt-Boelcke
- Production company: Luna-Film
- Release date: 17 December 1929
- Country: Germany
- Languages: Silent; German intertitles

Tragedy of Youth (German: Jugendtragödie) is a 1929 German silent drama film directed by Adolf Trotz and starring Roland Varno, Eva Speyer and Jaro Fürth. The son of a washerwoman is sent to a reform school for a minor crime, his mates having tricked him into stealing some money. He breaks out but the path he is on leads to him getting in fights, until he commits a murder.

== Cast ==
- Roland Varno as Peter
- Eva Speyer as Peters Muter
- Jaro Fürth as Inhaber einer Zeitungsfiliale
- Eberhard Mack as Sein Sohn Erich
- Wolfgang Zilzer as Emil
- Friedrich Kurth as Franz
- Emmy von Nagy as Cläre – ein Fürsorgezögling
- Fritz Kampers
- Julius Falkenstein
- Carla Bartheel
- Kurt Brenkendorf

== Bibliography ==
- Prawer, S.S. Between Two Worlds: The Jewish Presence in German and Austrian Film, 1910–1933. Berghahn Books, 2005.
