= The Unwritten Code =

1944 film

- Theatrical release poster
- Directed by: Herman Rotsten
- Screenplay by: Leslie T. White; Charles Kenyon
- Story by: Charles Kenyon; Robert Wohlmuth
- Produced by: Sam White
- Starring: Ann Savage; Tom Neal; Roland Varno; Howard Freeman; Mary Currier; Bobby Larson
- Cinematography: Burnett Guffey
- Edited by: Gene Havlick
- Production company: Columbia Pictures
- Distributed by: Columbia Pictures
- Release date: October 26, 1944
- Running time: 61 minutes
- Country: United States
- Language: English

The Unwritten Code is a 1944 American drama film directed by Herman Rotsten and written by Leslie T. White and Charles Kenyon. The film stars Ann Savage, Tom Neal, Roland Varno, Howard Freeman, Mary Currier and Bobby Larson. The film was released on October 26, 1944, by Columbia Pictures.

== Plot ==
When an Allied prisoner of war ship transporting a cargo of German prisoners is torpedoed by a German submarine in the North Atlantic, three survivors cling for their lives to a raft. The three are German prisoners of war Corporal Karl Richter, Private Heinrich Krause and British interpreter Roland Cheever. Cheever, who was wounded in the explosion, is vulnerable and defenseless, and so the predatory Richter decides to assume his identity. After stripping the helpless Cheever of his uniform and identity papers, Richter dumps his body into the sea.

Some time later, Richter and Krause are rescued by a passing ship, and Richter awakens in a hospital near the Midland Prisoner of War Camp. The papers found on his body identify Richter as Cheever, and so the hospital staff assumes that he is a British soldier and ally. Richter recuperates from his injuries, but because he still suffers from an injured right arm, his nurse, Mary Lee Norris, invites him to convalesce at her family's farm, Shady Acres.

When Mary Lee's fiancé, Terry Hunter, a sergeant at the internment camp, learns of the Norris' new boarder, he becomes jealous. One day, Mary Lee's younger brother Willie and his friend, Dutchy Schultz, are playing with a BB gun. Richter takes an interest in the boys' activities upon discovering that Dutchy's father owns a store that sells guns. After demonstrating his marksmanship by shooting a bird from a tree, Richter goes to the garage to ask Mary Lee for a ride to town. There, he embraces her against her will, and she has to struggle to free herself.

While the two drive to town, Richter asks to stop at the internment camp, and although he is forbidden to speak to the prisoners, he spots Krause among them. In town, Richter visits Schultz's store, and after observing the inventory of guns, he buys a map of the area. When Richter returns home, Mary Lee presents him with a telegram ordering him to report to the British Consul so that arrangements can be made for his return to England. While Richter studies his message, Willie calls Terry aside and tells him about Richter's two-armed attack on Mary Lee, causing Terry to become suspicious because Richter's right arm was supposed to be injured.

Soon after, a call comes notifying Terry of the escape of one of the prisoners of war. Richter retires to his room, and as he studies the map, he hears a tapping at the window and sees Krause outside. Informing Krause of his plan to free the German prisoners and arm them, Richter orders him to hide in the barn and await further instructions.

That night, Richter accompanies Terry and the Norrises to a benefit concert for the Red Cross, in which Mary Lee is to play the piano. After the adults leave, Willie recruits Dutchy to help search Richter's room. When they reach the concert hall, Richter decides to wait outside, and Terry, his suspicions aroused, places a call to the British Consul.

After the performance begins, Richter drives back to the barn, picks up Krause and proceeds to Schultz's store. The Germans steal all of Schultz's rifles, and hide them in the barn. The boys are still searching Richter's room when they hear his footsteps and hide under the bed. After retrieving a pistol from his suitcase, Richter drives off, and the boys emerge from his room and see Krause hiding in the barn. When they discover the German's discarded prisoner of war uniform, Willie sends Dutchy to town for help.

Richter is waiting outside the concert hall when Dutchy comes running in, yelling about a nest of Nazis. Richter immediately drives away and is soon followed by Terry and the other members of the town. Arriving at the barn first, Richter finds Willie, knocks him unconscious and then shoots Krause. After the others appear, Richter claims he shot the Nazi to save Willie. When Dutchy tells of Richter's earlier return to the house, the German asserts that he came back to retrieve Mary Lee's sheet music.

Excusing himself to go to his room, Richter sneaks out the back, loads the guns in the car and drives toward the internment camp. Terry and the military police are waiting for him in the woods, however, and deflect his progress with a hail of gunfire. Pulling Richter from the car, Terry exposes him as a Nazi and informs him that the British Consul sent a picture of the real Cheever. With the Nazi menace eradicated, the townsfolk return to their idyllic life.

== Cast ==
- Ann Savage as Mary Lee Norris
- Tom Neal as Sgt. Terry Hunter
- Roland Varno as Cpl. Karl Richter
- Howard Freeman as Mr. Norris
- Mary Currier as Mrs. Norris
- Bobby Larson as Willie Norris
- Teddy Infuhr as Dutchy Schultz
- Holmes Herbert as McDowell
- Otto Reichow as Heinrich Krause
- Theodore von Eltz as Major Spencer
- Blake Edwards as Swede
