= Alice Wynekoop =

American physician and murderer

Alice Lois Lindsay Wynekoop
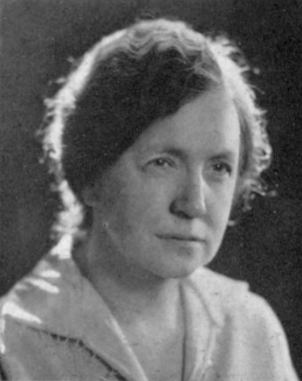
- Born: February 1, 1871; Delrey, Illinois
- Died: July 4, 1955 (aged 84); Chicago, Illinois
- Resting place: Rosehill Cemetery
- Other names: Alice Wynekoop, Lindsay Wynekoop, Lois Wynekoop, A. L. L. Wynekoop, A. Lindsay, Alice Lindsay Wynekoop
- Education: Northwestern University Women's Medical School
- Relatives: Rheta Gretchen Gardener Wynekoop
- Penalty: 25 years

Details
- Imprisoned at: Oakdale Reformatory for Women in Dwight, Illinois

Alice Lois Lindsay Wynekoop (February 1, 1871 – July 4, 1955) of Chicago, Illinois, was a well respected physician, professor, feminist, civic leader and educator in child hygiene, as well as the convicted murderer of her 22-year-old daughter-in-law, Rheta Gretchen Gardener Wynekoop. There were two trials, the first ruled a mistrial because of Wynekoop's fragile health. The second resulted in conviction and a 25-year sentence. After spending 13 years and nine months in prison, Wynekoop was released for good behavior and after a brief stay in a hospital, was removed to Burnside Rest Home, where she died at the age of 84 on July 4, 1955. Throughout Wynekoop's life she was known variously as Alice Wynekoop, Lindsay Wynekoop, Lois Wynekoop, A. L. L. Wynekoop, A. Lindsay, and Alice Lindsay Wynekoop, or other combinations of her first, middle, maiden, or married names or initials, and as an adult with the titles "Dr." or "M.D." affixed.

== 1871–1908: Family and education ==
Alice Lois Lindsay was born on February 1, 1871, in the small town of Delrey just south of Onarga, Illinois in Iroquois County. She was the daughter of Benjamin "Frank" Lindsay, a farmer, and Catharine Frances "Frannie" Wiswell Lindsay, an "efficient housewife". Her ancestors were largely Scottish and English. She was the third of six siblings, one of whom died in infancy. Her parents were well-to-do and well-respected in town. As a child she was frequently bed-ridden with malaria and anemia. Her infirmities delayed the start of her full-time attendance in public schools until she was 14, but until then she was home-schooled in basic academic subjects, as well as cooking and sewing.

In her teens, Wynekoop attended the Grand Prairie Seminary and Commercial College of Onarga, a private, preparatory, co-educational boarding school. She was experienced as "brilliant, but temperamental" and "an exceptional student in mathematics and chemistry". She was further described as "tall and large, with a ruddy complexion, blue eyes, and red hair". One of the ways Wynekoop exercised her willfulness was by attending the Methodist church "despite threats of her father to order her from the home". Her daughter Catherine wrote of her mother in 1933 that "No party was complete unless 'Alice' was there... She had a happy disposition and remarkable enthusiasm for life."

Wynekoop, prohibited by her father from going to college because of her health, studied medicine at home and worked on the farm. Defying his wishes, Wynekoop entered Northwestern University Women's Medical School and paid her own way. She graduated with honors in 1895 and was appointed chief of the resident staff at the Chicago Daily News Fresh Air Sanitarium for Babies. She taught there until she contracted tuberculosis, which was treated by a trip to Denver, Colorado. She returned to Chicago to teach biology at the College of Physicians and Surgeons. For a period of time Wynekoop was on the faculty of the University of Illinois, where both she and her future husband were regarded as "excellent teachers and scientists" and as "high ethically and professionally". She was also described by some of her students as "cold", but "not eccentric", and "far above the average mentality".

Wynekoop met her husband, Frank Eldridge Wynekoop, at Northwestern. The two married on April 17, 1900, in her hometown of Onarga, Illinois. They had six children: Walker William (1903–1948), Frank "Lindsay" (1902–1907), James "Earle" (1905–2000), and Catherine Frances (1908–2000). Catherine's birth put Wynekoop in bed for six months, and it was another six before she was able to work. Wanting a second daughter, they adopted Mary Louise (1909–1933). Later they fostered an infant, Barbara Jane, who eventually was placed with another family.

Wynekoop, described as a "Progressive Republican, an Episcopalian", and a "one time director of the Mother's Club of Epiphany parish", taught Sunday School and included her children in ministries to the poor. She was fluent in French and German. At her murder trial in January 1934, Wynekoop was characterized by a psychiatrist, Dr. James Whitney Hall, as a "mentally sound, emotionally well balanced, normal mother, deeply religious, kindly, cultured, affectionate but not demonstrative and highly intellectual." Her favorite pastime was reading.

== 1909–1918: Dr. Wynekoop the civic leader and lecturer ==
=== Lecture circuit ===
By 1909 Wynekoop was highly involved in the 10,000-member Illinois Congress of Mothers, which was affiliated with the Illinois Teachers' Association, and she was serving as the first chairperson of the hygiene committee, created at an annual meeting by a change in by-laws. She was also a leader and/or lecturer at the West End Mother's Council, Chicago Medical Society, Chicago Women's Club, and National Council of Defense. She led informal discussions and taught on topics such as "The Mother and Child", "Prevention (of infant mortality) by Education", "Religious Education in the Home", "The Relation of Home to School", "The Importance of Sleep",, "Home Care of the Sick", "Self Control", "Health in the Home" and "Men of Middle Age".

=== Child advocacy ===
Specializing in children's and adolescent issues, Wynekoop attended more than one state or national meeting of the Women's Congress with one of her "little bright haired, sweet faced" children in tow. In 1910 she brought Walker, eight years old, described as "sturdy, stanch, compact, healthy looking, and well dressed... fair haired, pink and white faced chap." In 1912 Earle, six years old, attended all the sessions of the Congress with his mother, who "couldn't bear to leave her little bright haired, pink cheeked boy, built in the exact image of his mother" at home. Earle arrived at that Congress dressed as a "friendly Indian" and entertained himself with some paint and coloring books. "He behaved exactly as little boys do under all conditions," finding something to say or ask frequently. "Dr. Wynekoop whispered, 'Sh-h-h-sh some 5,000 times." Earle was the center of the whole assembly's attention when in a session on the undermining influence of ragtime music Earle "rushed to the front and listened, exclaiming aloud his delight" when more suitable music was played. In Wynekoop's second trial for the murder of Earle's wife, a motive put forth for the killing of her daughter-in-law was "an abnormal affection for a favorite son", Earle.

=== Child adoption ===
Child adoption was a frequent topic of Wynekoop's lectures. By way of example she and her husband adopted an infant, Mary Louise, in 1909 when the infant was three months old, because it was Wynekoop's "duty toward the race to do so". At the 1910 Mothers' Congress, Wynekoop asserted that "He who adopts a child does more good than Rockefeller, Carnegie, or even Florence Nightingale." Her adoption of Mary Louise, she said, showed how a busy person—in her case, a doctor, professor, homemaker, and mother—could make room in her life for an additional child whose "hereditary faults" were unknown but could become "a fine woman" when entrusted to a "wholesome environment and general moral training". Adoption meets a heart-felt need, she concluded, to take in a needy world.

At a West End Mothers' council meeting a year later in 1911, Wynekoop stated that adoption "is a broadly humane act toward the little waif of a child." She added that more than one child in a family is essential because "the first child is so largely a matter of experiment" and the lessons learned could be applied to the younger siblings who came along. Additionally, she believed that multiple children assured that the one child would not be pampered and that parents would not be left desolate if something would happen to the first.

Wynekoop's advocacy for adoption became more controversial when she asserted at the 1912 Congress that "Every single man or woman who earns $20 a week or more should adopt a baby." Responses in a subsequent telephone poll of bachelors included everything from "don't-call-me-up-again-about-that-silly-rot" to concern for who would care for the baby while the bachelor was at work. Within a few months, however, her argument had inspired three bachelors to adopt. Overall her conviction was something of a bombshell, however, because twenty years later several papers were still talking about it. The Santa Fe column "Jabs in the Solar Plexus" described Wynekoop's 1912 assertion as "shocking". "That advice", it said, "would have seemed to impose a particular hardship on a man."

In a column on adoption in 1914 Wynekoop reminded her readers that all children have a right to life. "Surely a child is a gift to the world," she stated, "and shall we stand idly by while these wonderful gifts perish by hundreds—for lack of a home? She showcased babies in baby shows and contests that awarded "blue ribbons and honorary degrees" to children "who were found above the standard set for normal children." The 1916 Baby Show reported some 4,000 infants competing, 550 of which were considered "super-normal babies" who ought to "be given special instruction in the schools in order that their possibilities may be given the freest range." That same year Wynekoop facilitated adoptions by announcing, under the headline "Babies Given Away", "a wholesale adoption campaign" for 500 orphans.

Wynekoop, referred to as a "he" in one article, was also criticized nationwide for her recommendation that boys be allowed to sleep in.

=== Sexuality ===
As part of Wynekoop's concern for hygiene was a conviction that sexuality, particularly with respect to maturing boys and girls, needed to be more openly discussed. In 1912, she joined a team consisting of the superintendent of Chicago schools and other physicians to lecture on matters that would impact the hygiene of "the modern girl" and "the prevalence of certain diseases and the dangers they represent to the unborn children and innocent women." Wynekoop planned to initiate a more intimate conversation on a hygiene with the women participants, but promised not to be too technical or to illustrate them. Her audience on the first occasion, which consisted of "fashionable mothers" dressed in "stylish gowns", found the lecture so difficult, however, that they "placed their fingers to their ears." Subsequently, it was announced that future lectures for women would use "veiled expressions", but men would hear "straight-from-the-shoulder talks".

=== Suffrage and equality ===
Wynekoop gravitated toward causes that invited men and women to share equal responsibility for the health of family and society. At the 1912 Mothers' Congress, for example, Wynekoop was inspired by a speaker's vision of the inclusion of a woman on the presidential cabinet who could advocate for the welfare of children. She was so moved by the idea, in fact, that she volunteered to take a resolution to that effect to "the national government and to the presidential candidates with requests for interviews as to how they feel."

In a hygiene lecture in Bloomington, Illinois, Wynekoop lauded the increase in public interest in child welfare and stressed the critical role parents play in rearing children who were healthy. She maintained that the "relationship, spiritually and mentally, of the father and mother" impact the child's welfare. She conceded that while women have a more demanding role in child-rearing, "the responsibilities of the father are truly great." She recommended that both boys and girls learn "the importance and necessity of home-making in all its finest and dearest sense".

In an address to Presbyterian women in 1918 Wynekoop, representing the Women's Section of the Board of Social Hygiene of the Army Training Camps of America, reported on educational programs, restrictions, and consequences for soldiers that aimed to do away with "the double standard of judging moral relations of men and women". Some soldiers would need support upon returning home. She said, "They must return to a wholesome environment."

Wynekoop, who was described by the Chicago Tribune as "prominent in feminist movements", was a member of the Chicago Political Equality League and Illinois Equal Suffrage League.

=== Eugenics ===
Eugenics, the science of improving a human population through genetic selection, was of interest to Wynekoop. At the National Congress of Mothers in 1911, she asserted that "race suicide" of a certain type of people "would be the best thing that could happen to the country." At the 1912 Congress, she identified, more specifically, "society women" as a type needing extinction. The paper quoted Wynekoop as saying that she "had no respect for the women hypocrites who try to 'reform' people who need it far less than they do themselves." At this same congress she "advocated race suicide for mothers of the poor" and for the criminal element. "They are a burden on the rest of humanity." Her convictions were not wholly appreciated by some of the women gathered.

Wynekoop, who in 1918 was serving as the chairperson of the eugenics department of the Mothers' Congress and parent-teacher association, ignited a national scandal when at the National Congress of Mothers held in Aurora, Illinois, she defended women who bore war babies without the sanction of marriage. She asked, "For the race, is or is it not more important that the man who loses his life should first have reproduced himself with or without marriage?" She affirmed all single mothers for fulfilling their womanly function in life, which, she said, is to procreate, especially in a time when "loss of life among the fit" would diminish the race. She noted that unmarried mothers offered an even greater sacrifice than married women, because they forfeited virtue, as well. She reminded her audience that fatherless children were not to blame and have "the right to be born without a handicap such as the lack of a name". A writer in the Lebanon, Pennsylvania Evening Report withheld no judgement on her "cold" discussion of babies with no fathers and the assembly's apparent placid acceptance of it. The writer closed with a remark to the effect that Wynekoop could not possibly understand the stigma attached to unwed motherhood unless she herself was a criminal who came out of prison "to wear his stripes forever". A contributor to the Morganton, North Carolina paper commented that what unwed mothers were sacrificing was their one link to Jesus Christ who was himself pure. He concluded by thanking God for predestination of souls and the eternal destiny of splendor promised to the pure and the eternal end of "Satan and his imps" who "will be banished forever to that place prepared for them."

== 1919–1932: Low profile years ==
After 1918 Wynekoop abruptly fell off the media's radar. Only rarely was she reported giving lectures or offering leadership in medical or women's circles. The paper mentions in August 1922, however, that she and her family were departing for their summer home in Michigan. In 1923 the media named her as one of several eulogizing a well-known Chicago doctor and giving $500 toward an orphans' fund. In 1930 the paper reported that Wynekoop's daughter, Catherine, had joined her mother in medical practice. Wynekoop's husband died after a short illness on January 2, 1929, during an epidemic of influenza. A few months later her husband's mother, Helen Margaret Haynes Wynekoop, died, too. Mary Louise followed, dying of a "weak heart" at the age of 23 in March 1933.

== 1933–1955: From court to prison ==
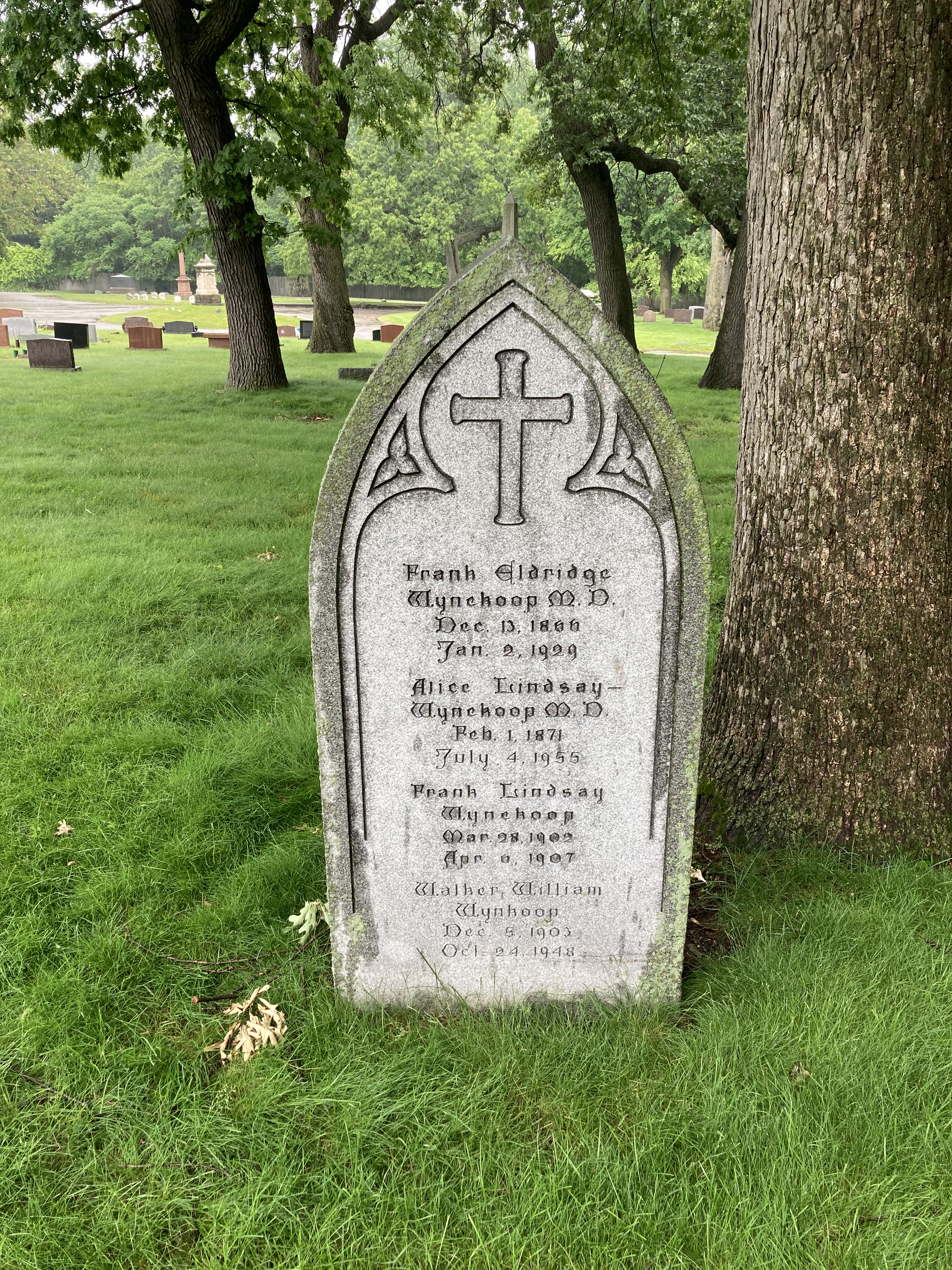
Wynekoop's grave at Rosehill Cemetery

On November 21, 1933, Wynekoop reported discovering the body of her daughter-in-law, Rheta Gretchen Gardner Wynekoop, on her examination table in her basement surgery. She denied, confessed and then denied again the charges of murder. The motive was ultimately attributed to financial pressures and her motherly protection of her son, Earle, who was miserable in the marriage. Wynekoop was tried twice, the first trial being declared a mistrial because of her poor health. The second resulted in a conviction for murder, as well as a sentence of 25 years. She was incarcerated for fourteen years at the Oakdale Reformatory for Women in Dwight, Illinois, where in a later news article on the prison, she was described as "the matriarch". She was "a tired, sick, old woman, who did a great deal of knitting for the soldiers during the war."

She was released on December 29, 1947, for good behavior. After a brief hospitalization, she was moved to Burnside Rest Home in Chicago, where she lived anonymously and died at the age of 84 on July 4, 1955. She was buried at Rosehill Cemetery.
