= State of Illinois v. Alice Wynekoop =

State of Illinois v. Alice Wynekoop was a criminal case prosecuted in two trials, the first of which, in January 1934, was declared a mistrial because of the defendant's fragile health, and the second of which, in February–March 1934, resulted in a guilty verdict and a sentence of 25 years at the Oakdale Women's Reformatory in Dwight, Illinois. The defendant was Alice Wynekoop (February 1, 1871 – July 4, 1955), a well-known and respected physician, civic leader, and lecturer. Alice lived and practiced in Chicago and specialized in the health and welfare of children. She was charged with the murder of her 22-year-old daughter-in-law, Rheta Gretchen Gardener Wynekoop, of Indianapolis, who on November 21, 1933 was found on the examination table in Wynekoop's surgery, deceased.

Alice Lois Lindsay Wynekoop was variously known as Alice Wynekoop, Lindsay Wynekoop, Lois Wynekoop, A. L. L. Wynekoop, A. Lindsay, and Alice Lindsay Wynekoop, or other combinations of her first, middle, maiden, or married names or initials, and as an adult with the titles "Dr." or "M.D." affixed.

The trial was labeled from the start as a "mystery murder rivaling those of detective story thrillers." The Akron Beacon Journal said: "The entire nation stands engrossed by the murder of pretty Mrs. Rheta Gardner Wynekoop."

== November 21: A body on the table ==
On Tuesday evening, November 21, 1933, Wynekoop reported finding her daughter-in-law, 22-year-old Rheta Gretchen Gardner Wynekoop, the wife of her son, James "Earle" Wynekoop, deceased in her surgery. The surgery was in the basement of the Wynekoop home located at 3406 West Monroe Street in Chicago. Described as "an eerie place, huge and rambling" by detectives who searched it, the home was three stories high and had 15 rooms with boarders on the first and second floors and "many small, almost secretive rooms not included in that total." There were even two "sliding panels" in the garage that allowed a person to enter the home without setting off the alarm. The "mansion" had been built by Wynekoop and her husband as a "dream house" as their young family expanded. Rheta and Earle were among the boarders.

=== Crime scene ===
The night of Rheta's death was described as "typical of a mystery novel. Outside the weather was foggy and a dank mist overhung the city." The police arrived at the Wynekoop home at 10:00 p.m. and found Rheta lying partially clothed on her left side on the examination table with a bullet wound in her back. Evidence gathered by police that evening included: powder burns around the bullet wound, no evidence of a struggle, care given to covering her body with a blanket, a .32 caliber revolver near her head wrapped in gauze and wiped clean of finger prints, an open desk drawer and missing $6.00, and a written notice of a 4:30 p.m. telegram delivery attempt. In addition, detectives found a bottle of chloroform and a "passionately termed love note" dated Sunday night (November 19) written by Wynekoop to Earle, who could not be found. The note read, "Precious: I'm choked. You are gone—you have called me up—and after ten minutes or so I called and called. No answer. Maybe you are sleeping. You need to be, but I want to hear your voice again tonight. I would give anything I have to spend an hour in real talk with you tonight—and I can not—good night." Detectives also found the hat and coat Wynekoop had worn on a reported shopping trip that afternoon.

=== Unfolding story ===
Detectives determined that Rheta was still alive around 3:00 p.m. that day, because, returning from an errand at that time, she declined an invitation to take a walk with a neighbor, Vera Duncan. Rheta explained to Duncan that she needed to get home before Wynekoop departed on an errand. Wynekoop stated that she left the house when Rheta arrived and that she returned about 5:30 p.m. Wynekoop then sent a boarder, Enid Hennessey, a school teacher, on an errand to buy some chloral hydrate. When Hennessey returned, the two had supper together. Rheta was not at supper, Wynekoop said, and when she was still missing a few hours later, Wynekoop became concerned and began searching the house, finally finding her daughter-in-law's body on the table in her surgery. Wynekoop immediately phoned two of her children, Catherine and Walker, and then summoned the undertaker, who realized two hours later that Wynekoop had failed to notify the police and did so himself. Wynekoop later apologized for failing to notify police first. Police took Wynekoop to the Fillmore Police Station along with Catherine, Walker, and Hennessey as well as Wynekoop's sister (Mrs. Harvey Woods), a niece, and a sister-in-law who had also come to the home. All in custody, including Wynekoop, were released around midnight. Police were stationed outside the Wynekoop home.

==== Break-in theory ====
That evening detectives ruled out the possibility of suicide because "Nobody, not even Houdini, could have shot himself in the manner this girl was shot." It seemed more plausible to detectives that there had been a break-in by a "drug fiend," especially since other break-ins had allegedly occurred at her home. Contributing to the break-in theory was the story given by Wynekoop to the police that no one was at home at the time of Rheta's death.

==== Search for Earle Wynekoop ====
Authorities immediately launched a search for Earle, who, Wynekoop said, was on his way to the Grand Canyon to take pictures. This story was corroborated by Stanley Young, a companion on the trip, who ultimately provided the alibi that eliminated Earle as a suspect. Young's story was that the two had departed Chicago about 10:00 a.m. on the day of Rheta's death, passing through Peoria, IL, around 3:00 to 3:30 p.m. and arriving in Kansas City around 12:30 a.m. on Wednesday. At Peoria Earle sent his mother a telegram saying they were late starting because Young was having "domestic problems," a perplexing message to police and Young's uncle because Young was not married. Law enforcement in Kansas City had already been notified to apprehend him.

== November 22: Wynekoop a person of interest ==
=== Inquest ===
Wynekoop was back at the Fillmore police station by 9:30 a.m. on Wednesday for the coroner's inquest, which was held at the mortuary. Several witnesses were heard, including Wynekoop, who provided general information about the house, Rheta, and Rheta's marriage to Earle. She stated that she had not seen Rheta alive since 2:00 p.m. the day before, when she left on an errand. When questioned about any life insurance policies on Rheta, Wynekoop denied knowing anything, except that Rheta had been turned down by several companies because she was underweight. Wynekoop stated, also, that she loved Rheta "as much as the dead girl's husband, Earle, her son" and that "Earle and Rheta were very, very much in love—so much so that I often said jokingly it couldn't last."

Rheta's father, Burdine Gardner, "a well-to-do flour and salt broker" from Indianapolis, testified that his daughter had been unhappy in the marriage. Officers Sam Peterson and Walter Kelley next described the position of Rheta's body on the table and confirmed the physical impossibility of her placing the gun about 18 inches away from her head where it was found. They stated that Wynekoop had contradicted herself in the story-telling, first saying she had not missed Rheta until finding the body and later saying she found it after calling the neighbor, Vera Duncan. Duncan gave details of her 3:00 p.m. encounter with Rheta, as well as Wynekoop's phone call to her around 7:00 p.m. to inquire if she had seen Rheta. Enid Hennessey, the boarder, testified that "Earle and Rheta were a devoted couple. There was no discord of any kind." She defended the decision not to call the police because "we were all so nearly collapsed that we didn't know what we were doing." It was pointed out to her that they were apparently oriented well enough to call family members and the undertaker. After these witnesses, the inquest was ended abruptly when the coroner announced that he had received additional information that would be relevant to further deliberations.

=== Ongoing investigation ===
==== Insurance and indebtedness ====
Other discoveries on Wednesday included a report from officials of New York Life Company that on November 14, less than two weeks prior to Rheta's death, Wynekoop had, in fact, purchased a $5,000 double indemnity life insurance policy on Rheta, of which Wynekoop herself was the beneficiary. Wynekoop explained the purchase in terms of a "kindly ruse" to convince Rheta, who worried about her health, that she was healthy, because she had passed the insurance company's exam. A second explanation was that she considered Rheta a child, and she had policies on each of her own. An additional double indemnity policy for $1,000, taken out November 2 and benefiting Earle and Catherine, was discovered the following day. Captain John Stege, the officer in charge of the case, learned that the doctor, despite having received a $75,000 inheritance from her deceased husband and having an annual income of $8,000 per year, was down to $26 in her bank account. She had a mortgage on which she was delinquent, and she owed back pay to her boarder Hennessey for housekeeping services.

==== Inconsistencies ====
Stege seriously questioned Wynekoop's story that she was downtown shopping all afternoon, rejected the idea that an intruder would have taken time before leaving to cover Rheta's body, and wondered why Wynekoop had not called police first. Detectives at the house stated that there were no signs of attempted break-in through windows or the door; nor were there sightings of an intruder by neighbors. Neighbors did report hearing a loud sound about 3:00 p.m. that they attributed to a backfiring auto.

There was also the matter of the telegram messenger's observation that lights in the house were on when he left notice of the delivery attempt at 4:30 p.m. This contradicted Wynekoop's story that the lights were off when she arrived home at 5:30 p.m., as well as the discovery of the messenger's 4:30 p.m. notice in the operating room Wynekoop claimed she had not entered until 8:30 p.m.

==== Postmortem ====
While the inquest was in session the coroner's assistant was conducting the postmortem. He noted that Rheta was mostly undressed at the time of the shooting. Burns around her mouth indicated she had been given chloroform, and powder burns around the wound indicated that the barrel of the gun had been held close to her back. The postmortem also showed she was missing about three quarts of blood, which was not accounted for until the finding of three blood-stained blankets later that day.

==== Other sudden deaths ====
In addition, on Wednesday some "gossiping neighbors" advised authorities that there recently had been four other sudden deaths in the doctor's house, three in the last year. First was Wynekoop's husband, Frank Eldridge Wynekoop, "a man of apparent strong constitution," who suddenly sickened and died in the fall of 1929. The second was the March 1933 death of Wynekoop's adopted daughter, Mary Louise, who was not as concerning because she was "less robust than her foster father." A third was Catherine Porter, "a spinster", whom Wynekoop was treating for heart disease. Wynekoop, it was told, shared a $2,000 bank account with Porter and was named the beneficiary of her property, including a 100-acre farm. The woman's body was cremated a day after her death, and a relative later contested the will. The fourth sudden death was Hennessey's father, who was under the medical care of Wynekoop and died from a heart condition the previous May. Death certificates were secured on the four named, and no basis was found for further investigation.

Based on these discoveries and conflicting stories, Captain Stege concluded by the end of the day that the evidence "tended to disprove explanations that Mrs. Wynekoop was a victim of an unknown marauder." "Some one in the house knows all about this murder." Wynekoop continued to be questioned into the evening and was released to return to "the house of death" shortly after midnight, this time to find her home surrounded by a crowd of some 100 people and cars bumper-to-bumper passing slowly by.

== November 23: Wynekoop arrested ==
Earle evaded the officers in Kansas City on Wednesday. He scheduled and then cancelled a flight back to Chicago "when told the weather was rough" and instead took an overnight train back to Chicago. Upon arrival in Chicago on Thursday morning he took a circuitous route of buses, taxicabs, and back alleys to get home. When confronted by police near his home he denied his identity, which neighbors refuted, as well as knowledge of Rheta's death. With his mother's encouragement, Earle voluntarily turned himself over to police.

=== Son's marriage and philandering ===
In interrogations on Thursday, Earle made several admissions to the police. In addition to confirming the $5,000 and $1,000 insurance policy purchases, he admitted that his mother had instructed him two months before to change the beneficiary on a $10,000 policy he owned from Rheta to his sister and told him to keep her instructions to himself. He admitted having had a secret meeting with his mother the Sunday before Rheta's death contrary to his mother's claim that she had not seen Earle in a week. Wynekoop later explained that Earle was concerned that the neighbors would be judgmental about his lack of a regular job and inability to support Rheta financially, and so he didn't want to be seen at the home where neighbors would conclude that his first trip out west was a failure. Another admission was that he was a philanderer. Investigation into his dalliances found that Earle had a book with the names of over 50 women he had courted, along with his assessment of the women's looks, financial status, and social value.

Earle and Rheta, a professionally trained violinist, were married on August 31, 1929, after a whirlwind romance. Wynekoop stated to investigators that Earle "lost all love and affection for Rheta within a month after he married her because she was anemic and sickly," "mentally inferior," and "mentally deranged." Earle stated that they had drifted apart.

Police spent much of Thursday interviewing three of Earle's paramours, all of whom believed Earle had serious intentions in the relationships or were even engaged to him. One, Priscilla Wittl, testified that Wynekoop would have known about Earle's infidelities because Wittl phoned the house once and asked for "Mike," the alias Earle had provided Wittl, and Wynekoop called Earle to the phone.

=== Coroner's report ===
The report of the coroner's chemist was released Thursday evening, verifying that Rheta had, in fact, been anesthetized with chloroform. The coroner further established that death occurred sometime between 3:00 and 6:00 p.m. and that Wynekoop was the only person who could have been home at that time. Significance was attached to evidence that Rheta had voluntarily removed her clothes as if preparing for an examination, and so must have been with someone she trusted. The coroner concluded, therefore, that "no one but the doctor could reasonably have committed this crime." Wynekoop was arrested at 10:45 p.m. at the funeral home, where she had gone to view Rheta's body.

== November 24: Wynekoop's admission ==
=== Interrogation ===
Wynekoop "accepted her arrest with composure" Thursday evening. At the Fillmore station, she was placed in a room next to Earle's, where she was evaluated by psychiatrists, who declared her to be sane. One's evaluation was that she had "a dominant personality" and was "astute." He said, "She parries questions with the greatest of ease, and she shows no evidence that her mentality has been affected by age. I should say she is the strong willed New England type." He also stated that Wynekoop "is able to convey an impression of the greatest candor," yet she was adept at turning the police's questions to her own advantage. Wynekoop answered "in a staunch, straightforward manner, like an expert."

At 4:30 a.m. Wynekoop submitted to a lie detector test, but as questioning commenced, she observed to technicians that, because of her high blood pressure, "this contraption will be of little help to us." Interrogation continued for two more hours, at which time she was taken, despite her protests to be released to go home, to a cell in the women's section of another station. One of the alienists who had observed Wynekoop that morning stated that, "Either she is completely innocent, or she is the most heinous of criminals."

=== Earle's confession ===
Overnight, Earle, who had been booked on a charge of murder, also submitted to a lie detector test and more intense questioning. In the morning, he confessed that he was the killer. He told the detectives that he was with Rheta when she was sitting on the examination table. He said she "lost her balance and fell." Then he picked her up, poured some chloroform in her mouth, and held his hand over her mouth. After she lost consciousness, he shot her. Earle's "pack of lies" was refuted by his traveling companion, however, and subsequently Earle admitted he was "fooling" to protect his mother from the electric chair. He stated he would make "an ironclad confession to save the one I suspect." He proceeded to state that his mother might have a motive for killing Rheta, because she was aware of his affairs and his unhappy marriage. Earle and his mother were then placed in the same room where Earle encouraged his mother to admit her guilt. Wynekoop responded, "I know all the evidence points against me but I didn't kill her." Earle wept as he answered, "Yes, the evidence does point to you ... And you had a motive." When Earle was released, Wynekoop pleaded to be released as well because, she said, she needed to arrange for Rheta's funeral. Police pointed out that Rheta's family had already departed with Rheta's remains and planned a funeral in Indianapolis. Wynekoop insisted that a service for Rheta would be held in Chicago, as well.

=== Wynekoop's admission ===
The coroner and State's Attorney stated that Wynekoop's admission was obtained "without threats or bluster," but by winning her confidence. It also was, they said, the chemist's report of chloroform in Rheta's organs that moved Wynekoop away from "her stoic denial" to embrace the story of an accidental overdose of the drug. When the attorney asked her to admit that she chloroformed Rheta, Wynekoop responded, "'But how can I explain this part of it?' She formed her hand to imitate a gun and trigger." Captain Stege stated to the press afterwards that Wynekoop "began to realize she was getting in deeper and deeper and the confession look to her like a good way out."

Wynekoop's initial story was that she shot Rheta and created a scenario of murder by intruder in order to cover up her own medical malpractice. Later, in her formal statement, Wynekoop said that she fired the gun after considering what action would "ease the situation best of all." The written record of Wynekoop's statement said that she found Rheta sitting on the examination table in her treatment room partially disrobed after having weighed herself and complaining of a pain in her side. Wynekoop offered an examination and allowed Rheta to sedate herself with chloroform. When Wynekoop realized Rheta was not breathing, she administered artificial respiration for about twenty-five minutes, which failed to revive her. This caused Wynekoop to panic and fire the gun. After the shooting, Wynekoop immediately covered Rheta with a blanket and left the house. She later said, "When the shot fired I nearly fainted from the sudden noise. I can't explain why I did it other than the fact I was terror-stricken to discover that Rheta had died from the chloroform. I'm sorry."

=== Inquest reconvened ===
The Chicago Tribune reported that "more than 300 persons crowded into the inquest room at the county morgue, designed to seat but 100, and the crowd overflowed into the halls and the yard. Automobiles were packed hub to hub" as the inquest reconvened on Friday afternoon. Before the hearing began, Wynekoop was observed chatting casually with reporters, family, and friends with the "unruffled poise of a social leader greeting her friends who have dropped in for a pot of tea" and "allowing herself to be introduced to 'murder fans.'" At the hearing, the state's attorney presented the bloody sheet and pillow — evidence (contra Wynekoop's statement) that Rheta was still alive at the time of the shooting. Wynekoop said in the presence of the jury that she had signed the formal statement voluntarily. After twenty minutes of deliberation, the jury found that Wynekoop had fired the shot that killed Rheta and ruled that she be held for a hearing before the grand jury on a charge of murder.

=== Looking for the "true motive" ===
The questioning of Wynekoop continued into the evening on Friday as detectives sought a "true motive" for the crime. By then evidence and testimony given by Wynekoop herself offered several possibilities. She was "fearful of blame for killing the girl with the anesthetic." It was a mercy killing, because "'Rheta was an invalid ... unbalanced and could not live long." She did it out of "accentuated affection" for her "ne'er-do-well and wayward" son to save him from an unhappy marriage, or she confessed out of sacrificial desire to "shield" Earle from culpability. She needed the money from the insurance policies to cover her indebtedness.

== November 27 to January 3: Onward to trial ==
The following Monday, November 27, Earle Wynekoop was taken into custody once again and held at the Cook County jail on a charge of accessory before the fact of the murder of his wife. In the meantime, Wynekoop had become "seriously ill" and was treated in the hospital ward for a chronic bronchial cough and high blood pressure. By the end of the year, her health had improved enough, however, that she could take nourishment and read her Bible. She predicted, however, that hardening of her arteries would kill her before the start of the trial and stated that "death would not be unwelcome."

Investigation and gathering of evidence for the case continued. Among facts being sought was the exact cause of Rheta's death: whether she was killed by the chloroform or the bullet. Pursuit of this information led to the exhumation of Rheta's remains on Monday, November 27, because physicians believed the original autopsy had been "bungled." They did not plan to make the results public.

=== Wynekoop repudiates her admission ===
Wynekoop was indicted on November 30 after testifying before the grand jury that she had not been in any way compelled to make the statement on the previous Friday about Rheta's having being killed by an overdose of chloroform and then shot. Before the verdict was in, however, Wynekoop was repudiating the confession and stating that the intruder story was most likely. Her attorney said that Wynekoop had made the admission after 70 hours of sleep deprivation and "in response to clever suggestions by police, prosecutors, and alienists to have her admit something." In response the State's Attorney, Charles S. Dougherty, stated, "Such tactics have become proverbial with the Wynekoops. First we had Earle offering us an ironclad alibi, then repudiating that alibi and confessing that he killed Rheta, and finally admitting his confession was a hoax and his alibi the truth." He concluded, "The Wynekoop mentalities all seem to run in the same pattern."

Wynekoop stated that her love for her family was "not complex. It is strangely simple," adding, "The Wynekoop family is not nearly as strange as a good many other families." Earle, no longer considered a person of interest, was released on December 11 when the State of Illinois chose not to prosecute. He stated that he would give his life to a "personal investigation 'outside the household,'" saying that he could clear his mother's name. Rumors of an insanity plea were rejected by the defense, insisting that Wynekoop "would not taint her family with the blemish of insanity."

== January 4: Trial postponed ==
On Thursday, January 4, the opening day of the trial, several thousand "blood-thirsty" people competed for seats in the courtroom; those who were denied admission "howled their disappointment through the corridors." Much to the disappointment of those who were admitted, however, the trial was postponed at the request of Wynekoop's defense team, W.W. Smith and Frank Tyrrell, due to concern for a constant pain near the defendant's heart. Judge Joseph B. David responded by rescheduling for January 11 and asking for two days' notice if Wynekoop was not well enough for the trial to begin. If it needed to be delayed further, the trial would need to be transferred to another judge. As January 11 approached and Wynekoop's fitness for trial remained in question, Dougherty stated, "'We're not going to allow them to bring the defendant before the jury on a cot or in a wheel chair, if we can help it." He would ask for a continuance if she could not walk into the courtroom on her own.

At the same time Wynekoop's defense team petitioned the court to impound every piece of evidence, including the operating table on which Rheta died, which had been taken by police without a search warrant. That petition was denied. The judge did, however, permit the defense team to inspect the items prior to the trial. A visit to Wynekoop's cell by noted psychiatrist Dr. James Whitney Hall fed speculation that the defense strategy might involve a plea of insanity after all. On January 9, Wynekoop's defense attorneys stated that Wynekoop would make "a straight plea of not guilty" and that they would be ready on the January 11 date.

== January 11 and 12: Jury selection ==
On the first day of trial, Thursday, January 11, Wynekoop, veiled and dressed mostly in black, was transported from the jail to within about 30 feet of her seat in a wheelchair and then walked with support the rest of the way to her chair; in accordance with a ruling of the judge that demonstrations of her frailty should not be permitted to impact jurors and their deliberations, this was done out of sight of the candidate jurors. Judge David also ruled that the defendant's relatives would not be permitted to wear clothing expressive of mourning, stating, "There will be no scenes in this case." Outside the courtroom a crowd of 600 (others reported "thousands") tried to push their way in, as if attending "a Hollywood premiere," but only 100 were allowed in so as to make room for those men (women were not yet permitted to serve as jurors in Illinois) who were called to duty, along with witnesses for both state and defense. Four jurors had been approved and three others tentatively selected by the end of the first day. One writer summed up the day saying, "one person was almost forgotten — Rheta Gardner Wynekoop, the murder victim."

Wynekoop was variously described as "ashen-faced and heavily veiled, huddled in her chair as if to withdraw from the court's proceedings"; as "composed" when prospective jurors were asked if they were willing to impose the electric chair; and as exhibiting detachment except for "the almost constant swinging of one of her narrow feet," attributed by the reporter to agitation. The remaining five jurors were selected the following day, and the twelve were sworn in before court was adjourned for the weekend. Most of Wynekoop's family was present; Earle was not. Police had been searching for Earle for further questioning and were stationed at the Wynekoop home to intercept Earle if he should return.

Over the weekend Wynekoop issued a statement expressing a word of thanks for the number of Irish men on the jury, as "the Irish are an exceptionally sympathetic people"; and for some novels she had been given. She stated that she was turning to her Bible for comfort. She said she was confident in "the intelligence of the jury," which she stated had been "fairly picked." She also said, "I am innocent of the monstrous crime and confident of the ability of my attorneys to prove my innocence." A controversy arose over whether Wynekoop's formal account of Rheta's death had been a "statement" or "confession."

== January 15: Trial begins ==
On Monday, January 15, the first day of trial, a medical report stated that Wynekoop had the previous night suffered her fourth "heart attack" or "coronary spasm" since she had been jailed. Wynekoop remarked, "I know that I am dying, but you shall not stop the trial."

=== Opening statements ===
The opening statement of the prosecution, delivered by State's Attorney Dougherty, focused on the details of Rheta's death, particularly on evidence that would prove Rheta was killed by a gunshot administered by somebody else, not by suicide or by accidental overdose of chloroform. He stated that Wynekoop was the only other person home at the time, and the only one capable of administering the chloroform; he asked for the death penalty. He argued that Rheta and Earle's estrangement, Earle's secret meeting with Wynekoop two days before the murder, her financial problems, and an insurance policy with a double-indemnity payout would be proven the motive. During the prosecution's presentation "murder fans saw the heretofore impassive physician reach repeatedly for water, dab her tearful eyes and clutch her throbbing throat."

The opening statement of Wynekoop's defense team began with a repudiation of Wynekoop's statement to the police, which they stated was prompted by stress. The defense further said that Wynekoop knew nothing of Rheta's death until she found the body; that recent burglaries accounted for cartridges purchased by Earle for the gun; that Rheta's hypochondria prompted her self-administration of chloroform; that insanity ran in the Gardner family; and that one John Van Pelt, a friend of their handyman, had had access to her practice area. Defense attorney Frank Tyrrell talked about Wynekoop's long history of virtuous deeds and her attempts to soothe the breach between Rheta and Earle.

=== First witnesses for the prosecution ===
Burdine Gardner, Rheta's father, was the first of the prosecution's witnesses. He told the story of Earle and Rheta's whirlwind courtship and a one-day notice of the wedding; communications from Wynekoop stating that Rheta was sick, but that he need not come; and Wynekoop's instruction the night of the murder that he tell detectives Rheta's mother had died of tuberculosis. Enid Hennessey closed the first day with testimony denying that Wynekoop and Rheta were not on friendly terms.

== January 16: Bloody evidence ==
=== Rheta "missing" ===
On Tuesday, January 16, Enid Hennessey's testimony concluded. She was followed by Wynekoop's next door neighbor, Vera Duncan, the last known person to see Rheta alive. Duncan testified that shortly before noon on the day of Rheta's death Wynekoop had inquired about Duncan's afternoon plans. Duncan stated that she planned to walk and suggested Rheta might join her, but the invitation was declined by Wynekoop on Rheta's behalf because Rheta would be busy. At 3:00 p.m. Duncan met Rheta coming home from an errand, and Rheta personally declined Duncan's invitation for the same reason. About 7:00 p.m. Wynekoop called Duncan to inquire if Rheta, who was then missing, was there, explaining that Rheta had left the house after 3:00 p.m. and hadn't been seen since.

=== Testimony of the police chief ===
As Officer Arthur R. March took the stand, prosecution called for the operating table to be rolled into the courtroom, prompting the need for a hasty dosing of digitalis to Wynekoop. Catherine, by her side, "hissed at" the police chief, "Why didn't you bring the corpse in, too?" The prosecutor had actually considered employing an effigy of Rheta, but was concerned it could result in a mistrial. Along with the table, several other "gruesome" bloody items were entered as evidence to show Rheta was not dead at the time she was shot. The remainder of March's testimony that day was given to describing the scene of the crime in "meticulous detail" using a chart and pieces of evidence as props. The defense team's cross-examination of Officer March, perceived by the reporter as an "attack," attempted to undermine the officer's consistency and observations.

== January 17: Prosecution continues ==
The trial convened on Wednesday amidst concern for Wynekoop's health. Her defense attorney, Frank Tyrrell, stated, "She is so ill it would not surprise me if she passed away right in the courtroom." She had awakened "with a splitting headache and fever," and her priest was nearby with "religious oils for administration of the last rites of the church."

Officer March was back on the stand to be cross-examined by the defense. Officer John Kelly followed, describing his first findings at the scene the night of the murder and refuting under cross-examination the possibility of suicide and break-in by an intruder. The first telegraph messenger followed, testifying that at 4:30 p.m. lights were on in the home "that was supposed to be deserted" and that no one answered knocks or bells.

In the afternoon the undertaker, Thomas Ahern, was first on the stand, stating that Wynekoop said she had not notified police of the tragedy because she didn't want any publicity. He also stated that by the time he arrived rigor mortis had begun to set in. Police Officer Duffy was called to verify the written notes of his conversation with Wynekoop the night of the crime and to testify that the Wynekoops had reported no prior break-ins. A neighbor next testified that she had noticed lights on in the home in the afternoon; but on cross-examination said that the lights were usually on.

The lineup of prosecution witnesses on Wednesday also included three insurance agents who detailed Wynekoop's attempts to secure policies on Rheta's life, Rheta's absence during the application process, and the insurance companies' ultimate rejection of the policies either on Wynekoop's terms or altogether. Following was Wynekoop's physician friend, Dr. Frank Chauvet, who testified that he had been called to the Wynekoop home six weeks prior to the murder to examine Rheta for psychosis, which he did not find. He noted only that she was "undernourished" and had an abdominal swelling that Wynekoop said "she would take care of."

== January 18: Police captain's testimony ==
On Thursday morning more insurance agents were called to the stand by the prosecution in a continuing effort to show an insurance motive. In the afternoon the prosecution introduced as an exhibit the written record of the admission Wynekoop had made in the presence of police captain John Stege and psychiatrist Harry W. Hoffman, and that she had later recanted. The jury was excused while the prosecution and defense disputed the admissibility of Wynekoop's admission, which the defense attorney said was "obtained under duress and with about the most inhuman treatment I have ever heard of," especially considering Wynekoop's age. The judge allowed the statement, but clarified that the word "confession" was inappropriate. On the stand at the end of the day Stege described the first night's questioning. He denied that Wynekoop's admission was under duress. He quoted her as saying, "I wonder if I should tell you my story." Stege responded, "I told her I wanted only the truth," and reminded her that whatever she said would be admissible evidence in court. Cross-examination aimed to refute Stege's statement that there was no duress, and it also established that Wynekoop had offered to pay the entire annual fee for a policy that was ultimately declined by the insurance company, yet indicated her plan for a long-term investment.

=== Wynekoop's failing health ===
In the meantime, Wynekoop's health became increasingly worrying to her defense team. A reporter speculated about the likelihood of her holding up under the strain of the trial: "This is the question that is puzzling the hosts of 'murder fans' who are pushing their way into the criminal courtroom each day, eager to catch every word of testimony and eager to watch every emotional change of expression that comes to the gaunt face of the sixty-two-year-old defendant, whose iron will to see the trial through is as much an enigma now as it was in the beginning." When at one point Wynekoop slumped in her chair, spectators crowded around to watch the administration of digitalis. One of the lawyers attempted to disperse spectators by throwing a law book at them. Wynekoop was then taken back to the jail infirmary, her daughter claiming she had experienced a "serious heart attack." The absence of her son, Earle, was again noted by the prosecution team, which wanted him for questioning. The defense responded, "Earle will make his reappearance at the proper time."

== January 19: Mistrial declared ==
At the end of Thursday's session, Wynekoop collapsed and had to be revived with "hypodermics." Heart specialists remained with her over night, and the defense predicted Friday morning that "death was highly probable if she continued to stand trial today." An independent heart specialist determined that Wynekoop was "not faking illness" and could not continue. The defense proposed that the judge "withdraw a juror and declare a mistrial" and the prosecution objected, saying it "would be nothing but a subterfuge." The judge granted the motion for a mistrial, but reserved final judgment until Monday morning, January 22, to see if Wynekoop could, in the words of one reporter, "down the forces of weakness which are engulfing her," and allow her "to clear her name before she passes beyond the reach of any smirch."

== January 22: On to the retrial ==
On Monday afternoon, January 22, the judge declared a mistrial after Wynekoop signed off on the decision. She stated that "her children, fearing her death, wished it." By February 1 Wynekoop's health had improved, and she celebrated her 63rd birthday, "the dreariest in her life." In an attempt at humor, she stated that it was her first birthday in jail, and she hoped it would be her last.

=== Earle located ===
In the meantime, on Tuesday, January 30, Earle was located in a Milwaukee boarding house going by the name of Harry Clark. After questioning by police, he was released because there was no warrant for his arrest. He said that he fled to Wisconsin to avoid a subpoena that would require him to testify at his mother's trial. He blamed the police for being "unscrupulous" in their interrogation of his mother, adding, "They scorned scientific methods of crime detection at the time Rheta's body was found." He stated that he would soon depart for Arizona.

=== New trial date ===
In court on Tuesday, February 6, Wynekoop appeared before the new judge, Judge Harry B. Miller, to set a date for the second trial. Feeling better, Wynekoop asked to have it "immediately," while the defense team wanted more time to prepare for the trial. By agreement of all parties, the trial was set to begin on February 19. As she left the courtroom, Wynekoop said to reporters, "This waiting is driving me crazy — I want to get the ordeal of this trial over once and for all."

== February 19 to 24: First week of retrial ==
=== Monday, February 19 ===
The session on Monday was brief, as one of the defense attorneys was ill with an abscessed tooth. Wynekoop, however, arrived in court appearing stronger and to have "recovered her poise and self-assurance." She was even seen laughing. Wynekoop entered a plea of not guilty, instructions were given to prospective jurors, a few were interviewed, and court was adjourned.

=== Tuesday, February 20 ===
Jurors were again interviewed on Tuesday, February 20. By adjournment in the afternoon, eight jurors were sworn in and two more had tentative approval by both teams. All jurors had agreed to inflict the death penalty if evidence warranted. The judge dismissed any candidates who had discussed the case with their wives.

=== Wednesday, February 21 ===
On Wednesday, February 21, Wynekoop was feeling "terrible" as the morning session began. "I'm not as strong as I thought I was," she said, relieved, also, that Thursday was Washington's Birthday, and therefore a holiday. The last of the jurors were sworn in by 11:00 a.m. Opening statements were delivered. The prosecuting attorney was more reserved and brief than at the first trial: "no violent gesturing, no shouting of words — just a quiet monotone." The defense was wordier and more "vehement," taking twice as long as the first.

Following opening statements there was only one witness, Officer Arthur March, as the state's attorneys were taking "every precaution to see that Dr. Alice Wynekoop does not collapse again before her second trial for the 'operating room murder' is over." As March took the stand, the operating table was wheeled in, along with all the bloody evidence, which March used to recreate the murder scene, just as he had in the first trial. During March's testimony Wynekoop "bit her lips, swallowed hard, and lifted a shaking water glass to her lips."

=== Friday, February 23 ===
The Friday session began with the completion of March's testimony. Officer Kelly followed, testifying as he had in the first trial. Next Rheta's father, Burdine Gardner, testified that Wynekoop had controlled her daughter-in-law in matters of communication and insurance. In cross-examination of Gardner, the defense team challenged the prosecution position that Rheta was mentally ill and presented a novel theory that "Rheta, in a supposed insane spite against her Wynekoop 'in-laws,' had arranged to chloroform and shoot herself on the doctor's operating table — all to embarrass her mother-in-law." In her testimony, Enid Hennessey testified that she saw the coat Wynekoop customarily wore draped over a chair near Rheta, calling into question Wynekoop's alibi of window shopping at the time of Rheta's death. With respect to the gunshot, she demonstrated the location of the bullet wound by "holding her arm around behind her as though pointing a gun." She was reprimanded by the judge repeatedly for her obvious efforts to help the defense.

=== Saturday, February 24 ===
Public attendance at the courthouse was dwindling, with only twelve onlookers "in the spectators' seats" on Saturday. Enid Hennessey was cross-examined; then the prosecution called the undertaker, Thomas Ahern, to the stand. Ahern stated that he had thought Wynekoop's call strange, because she did not tell him the purpose of the call until he had arrived at the house, and did not show him the corpse until first detailing to him where she had been all that day. Ahern was followed by the insurance agents and telegraph messengers, whose testimonies were substantially the same as in the first trial. The session was adjourned at noon. Wynekoop stated she would "go to bed at once and remain there until Monday morning."

== February 26 to March 3: Second week of retrial ==
=== Monday, February 26 ===
On Monday, February 26, the trial arrived at the point where the first was interrupted — with the prosecution's submission of the statement made by Wynekoop during interrogation. Before the statement could be introduced, however, the bench again was asked to rule on its admissibility. Dr. Harry Hoffman, the Cook County psychiatrist present at the time of Wynekoop's admission, was first on the stand, testifying that in answer to his question about her motivation for the crime, Wynekoop answered, "I did it to save the poor dear." It was not clear whether "the poor dear" was Rheta or Earle nor whether "it" was her admission of shooting Rheta or the shooting itself.

=== Tuesday, February 27 ===
On Tuesday Thomas Dwyer, who conducted the two autopsies, was questioned by the defense on the angle of the bullet wound. Jerry Kearns, a second coroner, testified that a third autopsy had confirmed the conclusion of the first that Rheta had been killed by the gun, not the chloroform. Clarence Muehlberger, the chemist who had examined Rheta's organs, testified to the amount of chloroform found. David M. Sweet of City National Bank also took the stand to testify that Wynekoop had a $6,000 loan on her home mortgage, which was paid down to $3,500 and taken out to provide support for the poor health of both Rheta and Earle. He stated that Wynekoop had written him asking for several extensions due to lack of money and stating that although her property was producing little income, she would come into some money after the first of the year. In addition, an insurance man, Henry Olson, stated that Wynekoop owned an apartment building valued at over $55,000 and that in April 1931 she had taken out a $20,000 mortgage loan with the building as security. On the day of Rheta's death she owed the Great Lakes Mortgage company $1,500.

=== Wednesday, February 28 ===
On Wednesday the prosecution called Officer Samuel Peterson, who testified as he had at the first trial. The prosecution wound up its case by confirming their call for the death penalty.

==== Case for the defense begins ====
The defense first called the previous trial's court reporter, Vivian Molle, who was asked to read her record of the testimony of the prosecution's Dr. Hoffman, the county psychiatrist who participated in Wynekoop's interrogation. Hoffmann had described Wynekoop's interrogation as "the constant questioning of the old woman, slight, weak, and worn." Furthermore, Hoffman had said that Wynekoop denied knowing who the murderer was, but had asked whether Earle could go home if she confessed; Hoffmann had told her "yes." One of the insurance agents also testified before testimony ended for the day.

Margaret M. Jones, a physician, was the first character witness for the defense. She described Rheta as a woman preoccupied with her health and vulnerable to suicide. She recalled one occasion when, at Wynekoop's request, she was called to examine Rheta, who was lying stiffly on the bed with her eyes closed, "apparently" feigning an epileptic episode. Jones determined that Rheta was fine.

=== Thursday, March 1 ===
Walker was cross-examined by the prosecution first thing on Thursday concerning Earle's whereabouts and the "abuse" he felt his mother was subjected to during the eight-hour interrogation that produced her statement. There followed a number of witnesses; among them a neighbor, S. E. Cleveland, who said that he had seen Wynekoop at the hospital twice on the day of Rheta's death: first at 12:30 p.m. and later at 4:15 p.m. Fred Feigl, a pharmacist, testified that Wynekoop had purchased morphine shortly before Rheta's death; this testimony supported the defense's "break-in" theory by suggesting an intruder might have intended to steal the drug. There were more character witnesses, including Paul H. Mueller, a publisher, giving witness to all the good Wynekoop had done in the area; Marianna Bugge, a masseuse who had treated Rheta frequently; and Dr. Perry Rose, who stayed at the Wynekoop home while studying to be a doctor. All testified that Wynekoop loved Rheta and that she had no financial issues.

Catherine took the stand in the afternoon, testifying about her mother's phone call to her on the night of the murder. She stated that she had not called the coroner because she was advised by a nurse to wait and make sure Rheta was really dead. She also testified that she had experienced Rheta as depressed and planning to "do something Earle would be sorry for."

=== Friday, March 2 ===
Catherine's testimony concluded on Friday and was followed by Wynekoop's. Wynekoop again had to be carried, out of sight of the jury, to her seat on the stand. The defense sought to establish that the prosecution's case was only circumstantial. Wynekoop's attorney, W. W. Smith, asked her if she had "willfully, feloniously, and with malice aforethought" chloroformed and shot Rheta. Wynekoop denied the charge, but in a "dispirited" way. At a recess, Smith, who attributed her lack of boldness to her ill condition, sought the opinion of an observer, who confirmed that Wynekoop's responses had seemed to lack conviction. In direct examination Wynekoop testified as to her biography, the circumstances that had led to her fatigue at the time of her confession, and her own theory of the crime. She testified that the $10,000 insurance policy on Earle had been taken out for Rheta's benefit after consulting with both Earle and Rheta, and that she had tried to ease Rheta's melancholy after she complained of Earle's neglect. Wynekoop said of her admission that it had been "wheedled" out by her interrogators, who had assured her that Earle would be released once she had confessed.

Wynekoop testified, also, that she was told that the shooting of Rheta would not be considered a crime — that "the worst I'd be guilty of ... was an indiscretion — bad judgement" — and that it would not result in any indictment. Later, Wynekoop testified, she was told that Earle had confessed. When asked to describe the moment she found Rheta, Wynekoop's voice "choked" with sobs, a show of emotion which sent reporters abruptly out of the room to communicate with their offices.

Under cross-examination Wynekoop was questioned about insurance policies, her failure to use a stethoscope to verify that Rheta was dead, the sequence of events on the day of the murder, the crime scene, and the November 24 interrogation itself. After adjournment Wynekoop's heart required restoratives and rest.

=== Saturday, March 3 ===
The prosecution continued its cross-examination on Saturday morning with a point-by-point inquiry into her confession. Wynekoop consistently answered that she was not at the scene of the crime or did not remember. Just thirty minutes into the session, Wynekoop collapsed — the first time this jury had witnessed such an episode — and was sent to the judge's chambers to rest. The prosecutor described the episode as "carefully staged." After 30 minutes she was strong enough to return to the witness seat. Cross-examination concluded with questions about her indebtedness. After a brief redirect, court was adjourned until Monday morning. In the corridor on the way back to her cell Wynekoop "became hysterical," "screaming convulsively" and dropping her head.

== Monday, March 5: Closing arguments ==
Wynekoop arrived in court Monday morning "pale, haggard, and weak ... in the worst condition of any time since her arrest," and with a facial bruise caused by a fall early Monday morning. She and her son Walker appeared briefly on the stand; the defense made four motions as it rested at 11:01 a.m. The motions included one for a direct verdict of not guilty, two to disallow Wynekoop's admission, and one to compel the state to specify on which of the eleven counts it intended to proceed. All four motions were denied.

The prosecution called several rebuttal witnesses, including Stanley Young, whose testimony was intended to eliminate Earle as a suspect. The defense, however, was able to get Young to admit that the prosecution had paid him $190 for his testimony. In the prosecution's three-hour closing statement, Dougherty recreated the scene of Rheta's death and reiterated the key evidence of murder, including the care with which Rheta was covered; the lack of disorder in the surgery itself; Wynekoop's failure to check Rheta's pulse nor to seek help; her calm in reporting the death to the undertaker and her unusual interest in establishing an alibi for herself; Catherine's failure to confirm the death; and the ridiculousness of the suicide theory. The prosecution concluded by calling the jury to "do to her as she did to Rheta Wynekoop, the fondly loved daughter-in-law whom she killed in cold blood. She murdered that girl and deserves to die."

== Tuesday, March 6: Verdict ==
In his closing statement Wynekoop's defense attorney Smith argued that Wynekoop had come "from decent people ... and her interests have always been in the better things of life." He told of her long years of charitable work; reiterated her alibis; and debunked the prosecution's arguments for an insurance motive and against the possibility of suicide. The defense also claimed that Wynekoop's confession was about "mother love": that she was merely shielding Earle, "a boy maybe you don't think was worth saving." Smith ended his argument with a plea for the jury to find "a not guilty verdict quick."

=== Jury instructions ===
The judge instructed the jury that there were four choices for a verdict: not guilty, or guilty with the options of execution, life imprisonment, or imprisonment for a specified number of years. Wynekoop instructed her defense team to "gamble everything on acquittal," refusing a plea deal of manslaughter offered by the prosecution. The court was dismissed for dinner at 6:14 p.m.

=== Decision ===
Attachés of the court said that based on their own experience the jury would be out for a considerable time. However, at 7:50 p.m. — after just 36 minutes and two ballots — the jury returned a guilty verdict. They said it took just ten minutes to determine Wynekoop's guilt, and an additional 26 to determine the sentence. The jury specified a term of 25 years in prison. Two jurors had initially voted for the electric chair; a third voted for life only because "Dr. Wynekoop would probably welcome death." This rationale moved the other two jurors to choose life, as well. The verdict came fifteen weeks, almost to the minute, after the moment Wynekoop had allegedly found the body of her daughter-in-law.

Observers stated that Wynekoop registered no emotion as the verdict was delivered. She turned to Catherine and Walker, reassured them of her innocence, and told them to "go home ... and sleep." "Of all directly concerned with the outcome in the courtroom, she seemed least affected." (However, the jail physician was on standby.) The prosecuting attorney stated that the jurors were "a sensible hard-boiled jury, of whom we ought to have more," and that "I know in my heart that she is guilty. But nevertheless I feel sorry for her." Reactions among spectators were mixed, with those closest to her saying that the jury had ruled unjustly. Physicians stated that she was likely to succumb to her heart condition before she could be incarcerated. Rheta's father Burdine Gardner said, "Twenty-five years — yes, that is justice."

== Post-trial ==
Wynekoop immediately petitioned the court for a new trial, which on March 24 was "swiftly" denied by Judge Harry B. Miller, and she was ordered to begin her 25-year sentence. She was transferred from jail in Chicago to Oakdale Reformatory for Women in Dwight, Illinois, where for the first time since the day of her confession she met with Earle, who had arrived unrecognized by the press because of his "seedy appearance," mustache, and weight loss. She was permitted no personal possessions except for a few books and a Bible. Wynekoop was expected to remain in isolation until she could be evaluated by doctors to determine if she would be allowed to join "in the life of the institution and be a member of perhaps a class in sewing." She would receive no special privileges. Wynekoop requested of her children that her grandchildren not be allowed to see her while she was in prison.

In August 1934, the medical committee of the Illinois State Department of Registration and Education sent a notice to Wynekoop giving her a deadline of September 8 to file a justification for the continuation of her medical license. Wynekoop's attorney asked them to delay any revocation until after a planned Illinois Supreme Court appeal was concluded. Meeting in September, the committee recommended merely a suspension of her license; in the event Wynekoop's appeal failed, revocation would then be automatic. That suspension was approved on October 11, 1934.

In January 1935 Wynekoop appealed her case to the Illinois Supreme Court. The petition was denied on February 12. Two months later Wynekoop made an appeal to the United States Supreme Court for a review of her case, on the grounds that her admission was made under duress and thus should not have been admitted as evidence. The higher court affirmed the judgment of the trial court.

After her conviction Wynekoop transferred her property to Walker, who sold the house on Monroe Street to the owner of apartments adjacent to the property. The new owner proceeded to demolish the house "to give sunlight and air" to the apartments. After her release in 1947 Wynekoop would file a lawsuit to reclaim her remaining properties, which, she said, Walker had promised to return upon her release. However, Walker had died intestate in 1948 and that property had passed to Walker's widow, who now refused to relinquish it. The court ruled against Wynekoop's suit in January 1950.

By September 1936 Wynekoop was well enough to be moved into the general population of the reformatory where she was considered "just a woman" instead of a prominent physician." It was noted that she was the only college graduate among the prisoners, who had on the average only a fifth-grade education.

On December 12, 1936, Wynekoop's attorney, Paul E. Thurlow, told reporters that he was preparing to appear before the Board of Pardons to appeal for clemency. He also claimed that new evidence had been found to clear Wynekoop's name. The State's Attorney promised to "bitterly" oppose that appeal.

In April 1943 Wynekoop made an appeal for habeas corpus, writing a lengthy letter to a federal judge stating that the confession she had made was the only evidence of her guilt. Her appeal was denied because that court did not have authority to rule on the petition. The following year a friend and medical colleague of Wynekoop's, Bertha Van Hoosen, testified before the Board of Pardons, stating that Wynekoop had "ministered to the health and souls of her fellow prisoners for 10 years." She also denied that Wynekoop was guilty of the crime and said the crime was "entirely out of harmony with the character of the Dr. Wynekoop" she had known. Van Hoosen's plea was that Wynekoop be pardoned "in order that the medical profession, all women, her sorority, her church, and most of all her family, should be spared the humiliation of having one of their members die in prison." At the next session of the Board of Pardons the clergyman who had supported her throughout the trial urged clemency because "the name of the law has been upheld. She is now an old and feeble woman." The appeal for clemency was again denied.

=== Wynekoop released ===
Wynekoop, still denying her guilt, was released from Oakdale for good behavior in December 1947 after serving half of her sentence. At the same time the foreman of the jury "revealed his belief that she did not fire the bullet" because she had no experience with guns and could not have aimed it with accuracy. He stated his belief that she had hired a gangster to carry out the crime on her behalf. Wynekoop spent a period of time in Wesley Memorial Hospital to be treated for her blood pressure and heart disease before taking up residence at Burnside Nursing Home.

In October 1948 Wynekoop, urged by friends, took a "psycho-detecto meter" test, which measured truth by a different method than traditional lie detectors. According to the inventor and administrator of the test, the meter showed she "was '100 per cent okay' and had 'no knowledge of who killed the girl.'" In response, Wynekoop stated, "I only lived to prove my innocence. I can never thank you enough." The State's Attorney said that such tests were not admissible evidence in court, which had already determined her guilt.

Wynekoop announced plans to appeal to the Board of Pardons in November 1949, stating that she wanted a full pardon before she died. This new petition, Wynekoop said, was based on her belief that she made the confession believing it would save Earle, who unbeknownst to her had already been cleared, from prosecution.

=== Wynekoop's death ===
It was 1956 before word of Wynekoop's death on July 4, 1955, at the Burnside Nursing Home, was known. Her cause of death was arteriosclerosis and pneumonia; she had been cremated and interred at Mount Hope Cemetery. Her daughter Catherine had kept Wynekoop's identity a secret by using Wynekoop's given name, Alice Lois Lindsay. Neither nursing home staff nor the doctors who signed her death certificate knew she was the famous doctor who had been tried and convicted of murder. Wynekoop maintained her innocence until her death.
