= E.H. Roelfzema =

E.H. Roelfzema is the pen name of Erik Hazelhoff Roelfzema Jr. (February 17, 1947, The Hague - February 11, 2010, Kockengen), Dutch artist, writer, poet, lyricist and musician. In his art he used encaustic techniques, as well as polymer resin (glass panels), and monomer resin (embeddings). He travelled extensively, and from 1970 until 1990 he lived in Ahualoa, Hawaii, working as a farmer and fisherman, and surfing. He returned to the Netherlands in 1990 and married photographer Patricia Steur. His father was writer of the book Soldier of Orange, which was made into a film directed by Paul Verhoeven and starring Rutger Hauer. Musical collaborations include those with Roll, and Pizza Delivery Boys. Dutch rock band Golden Earring recorded numerous lyrics by E.H. Roelfzema, including the band's signature tunes: The Naked Truth.

== Books ==
- The Nine-Fingered Man (1990)
- Where is Kagen (with Astrid Engels) (1992)
- Voodoo Cave Writings for Cosmic Space Babies (1993)
- Spiral Nebula (2000)
- Twothousandandfour (2005)
- Five and a Half Turns (2007)

== Exhibitions ==
- Redwater Gallery, Hawaii (1987)
- Kohala Art Center, Hawaii (1989)
- De Twee Pauwen, The Hague (1995)
- Dante Gallery, Amsterdam (1996)
- Donkersloot Gallery, Amsterdam (1997)
- Studio Gallery Pim Van Der Donk, Amsterdam (1997)
- N.P.N. Gallery, Naaldwijk (1998)
- Peter Leen Gallery, Breukelen (1998)
- Jutta Bauer Gallery, Nijmegen (1998)
- Soho Gallery, The Hague (1999)
- SLB Gallery, Zeewolde (2000)
- Soho Gallery, The Hague (2000)
- Museum Kasteel, Wijchen (2001)
- Stadsmuseum, Zoetermeer (2002)
- Galerie Patries van Dorst, Wassenaar (2015)

== Recordings ==
- Golden Earring The Naked Truth (album) (1992)
- Pizza Delivery Boys On 42nd Street (single) (1993)
- Golden Earring Face It (album) (1994)
- MC Nukemaster Get Back, Chirac (single) (1995)
- Golden Earring Paradise In Distress (album) (1999)
- Eddie C. Take Me As I Am (album) (2000)
- Roll Crossroads (album) (2003)
- Golden Earring Live in Ahoy (album/DVD) (2006)
- George Kooymans & Frank Carillo On Location (album) (2010)
- Nick Vernier Band Sessions (album) (2010)
- Pizza Delivery Boys On 42nd Street (Remix) (single) (2015)
- Pizza Delivery Boys Spooky (single) (2015)
