= David Endt =

Dutch sports journalist, author and columnist

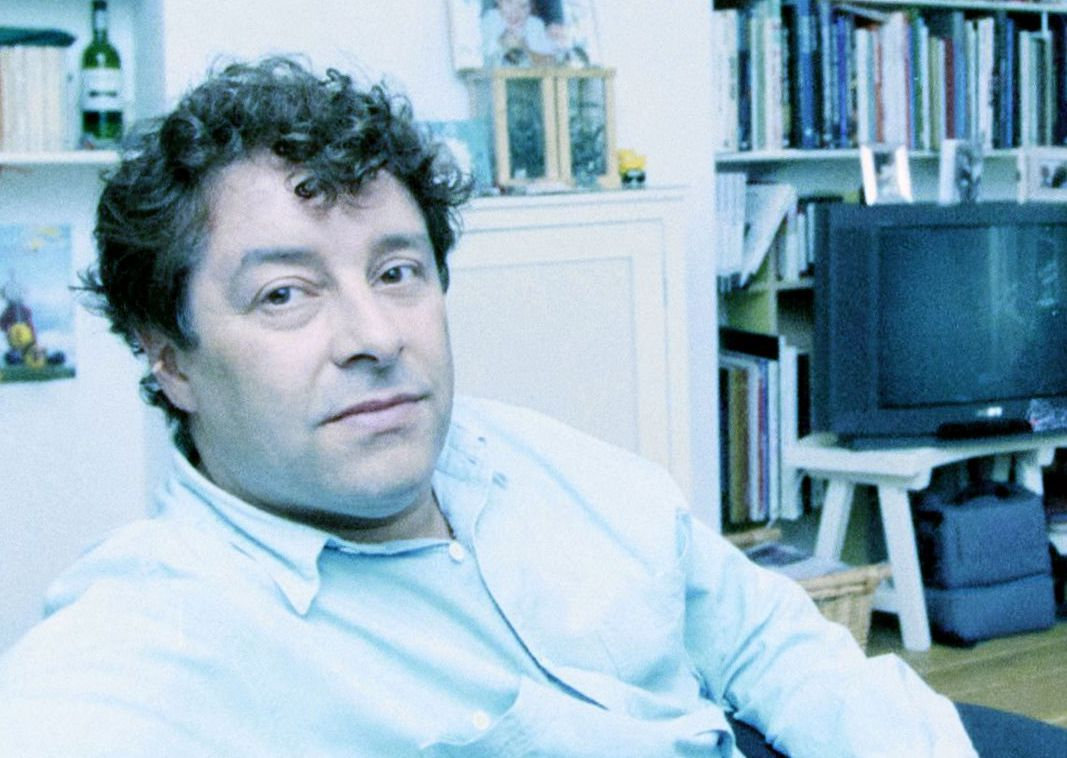
- David Endt in Amsterdam, 2000

Personal information
- Date of birth: 12 February 1954 (age 72)
- Place of birth: The Hague, Netherlands
- Position: Midfielder

Youth career
- Ajax

Senior career*
Years	Team	Apps	(Gls)
1974–1977	Ajax	0	(0)
1977–1978	DWV		
1978–1979	Racing Muide		
- * Club domestic league appearances and goals as of 6:35, 12 April 2014 (UTC)

David Endt (born 12 February 1954) is a Dutch sports journalist, author and columnist. From 1997 to June 2013 he was the team manager of Ajax before Technical Director Edwin van der Sar expressed that his services would no longer be required within the club.

== Career ==
Born 12 February 1954 in The Hague, Endt was a footballer playing in the Ajax Youth Academy. In the seventies, he joined the first team during the 1974–75 Eredivisie but suffered a long-lasting injury. He never made any appearance for the first team, playing for the reserves team Jong Ajax instead. In 1977, he was released from Ajax from where he joined DWV. After just one season with his new club he joined Belgian side Racing Muide.

In 1979, he began working for the Sports Marketing bureau Inter Football. It was from this organization that he first began writing for Ajax, such as putting together the club's own publication and program-magazine. In 1989 Endt was appointed as the new contributing editor for Ajax. From 1993 to 1999 he was responsible for all press contacts within the club. He was the team manager from 1997 to June 2013.

After his activity for Ajax, Endt became a columnist for Het Parool, and was also employed as a free-lance writer for Eurosport. He has written several books about football, mostly about Ajax, but also several others about his second love, Italian side Internazionale.

== Publications ==
- The shadows of San Siro (1989)
- Italian-Dutch football dictionary (1991)
- Twenty letters to Frank Rijkaard and a letter back (1991)
- The god sons of Ajax (1994)
- Gloria Victoria (1995)
- Target (1998)
- I Heart Football – The elements (2001)
- Ajax 1900–2000 (2001, with Sytze van der Zee)
- Ajax-goals (2003)
- Untold history (2008)
- Goool (2008)
- My Inter (2009)
- Route 32 (2013)
