= Wiardi Beckman Stichting =

Dutch think tank

The Wiardi Beckman Stichting (Wiardi Beckman Foundation) is a Dutch think tank linked to the left-of-centre Labour Party (PvdA).

The foundation is named after Herman Bernard Wiardi Beckman, a member of the Dutch Senate, who during the Second World War was summoned by Queen Wilhelmina to become a member of the war cabinet, but who was caught by the Sicherheitsdienst and who died in the Dachau concentration camp.

The foundation has published the magazine Socialisme & Democratie (Socialism & Democracy) since 1970.
