= Peter Tazelaar =

Dutch resistance member (1920–1993)

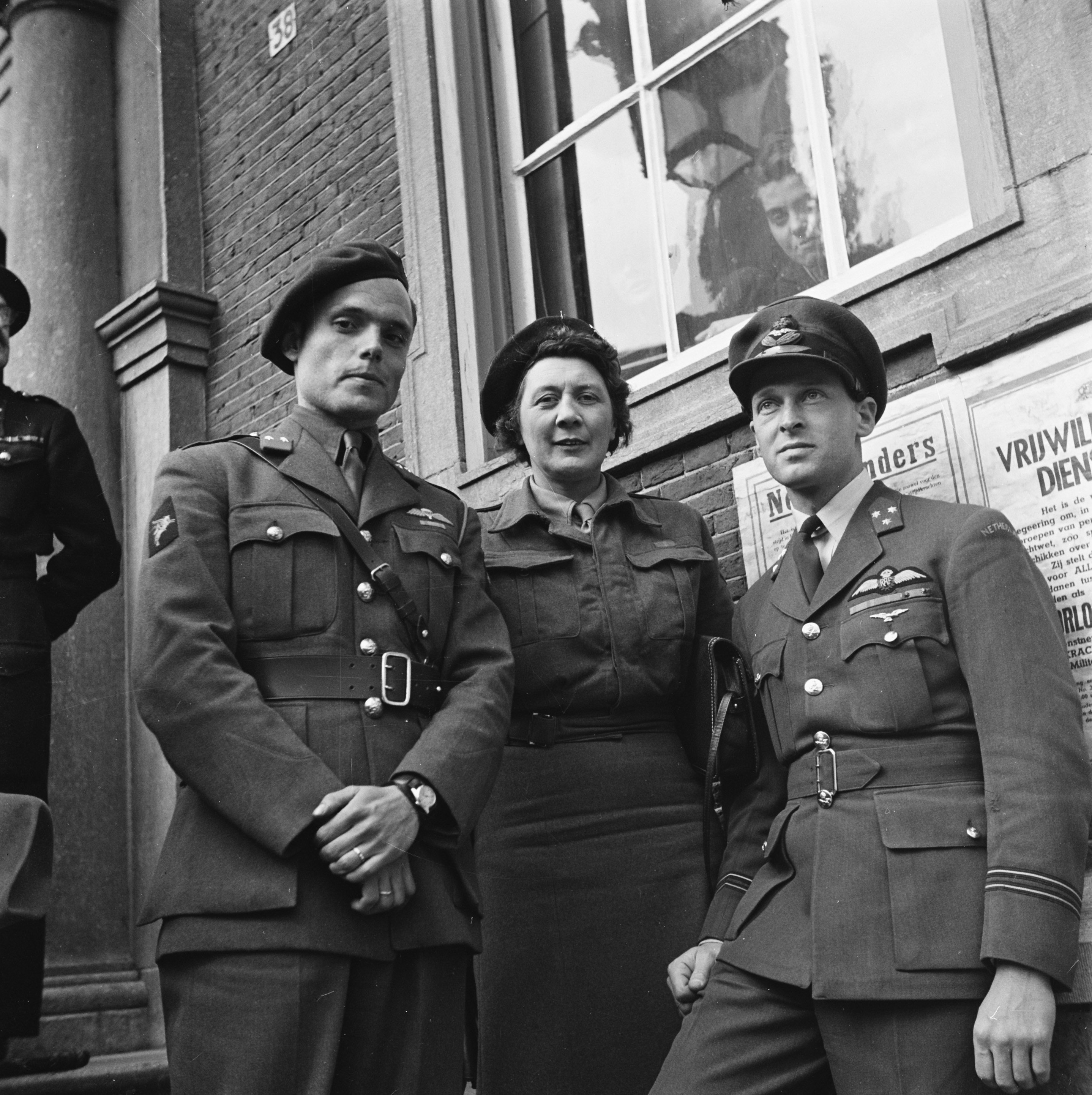
- Tazelaar (left) with Rie Stokvis and Erik Hazelhoff Roelfzema in Breda on 2 May 1945.
- Born: 5 May 1920; Fort de Kock, Dutch East Indies
- Died: 6 June 1993 (aged 73); Hindeloopen, Netherlands
- Awards: Military William Order
- Espionage activity
- Allegiance: Netherlands
- Rank: Lieutenant
- Operations: Contact Holland

Peter Tazelaar (5 May 1920 – 6 June 1993) was a member of the Dutch resistance during World War II and worked as an agent for the SOE. Following the war he served in Dutch East Indies, before returning to Europe to work behind the Iron Curtain in Eastern Europe for the United States, which served as an inspiration for Ian Fleming's James Bond series.

== Resistance ==
In September 1938 he trained to be a midshipman at the Royal Netherlands Naval College. In 1939 he moved to Groningen where he enrolled in the Hogere Zeevaartschool. When war broke out on 10 May 1940, Tazelaar was working for the Dutch Merchant Navy. He tried to escape to England by way of Zeeland and northern France, but he failed to reach England. After returning to Groningen in late May 1940, he came into contact with Midshipman John Birnie. During summer 1940, Birnie had joined a group of cadets and midshipmen that had formed a resistance group called the Ordedienst. Birnie introduced his new friend to the Ordedienst which was based in The Hague and headed by Dutch nobleman Joan Schimmelpenninck, who went by the code name of "Uncle Alexander".

== Mission to England ==
Since the resistance had no direct contact with England, Tazelaar was chosen to go to England to make contact with British intelligence forces. In early June 1941 he mustered as a stoker on the Swiss freighter St-Cergue. The ship was in the port of Schiedam and was voyaging to New York to pick up a supply of corn for the Germans. Two students from Leiden, Bram van der Stok and Erik Hazelhoff Roelfzema, also escaped to England with Tazelaar. In the Faroe Islands they transferred to a British cruiser and were able to reach England.

== Contact Holland ==
At first it was difficult to get into contact with occupied Holland. At one point Tazelaar and his friends communicated with Queen Wilhelmina and her son-in-law Prince Bernhard. They were able to live in the apartment at the home of Wilhelmina in England.

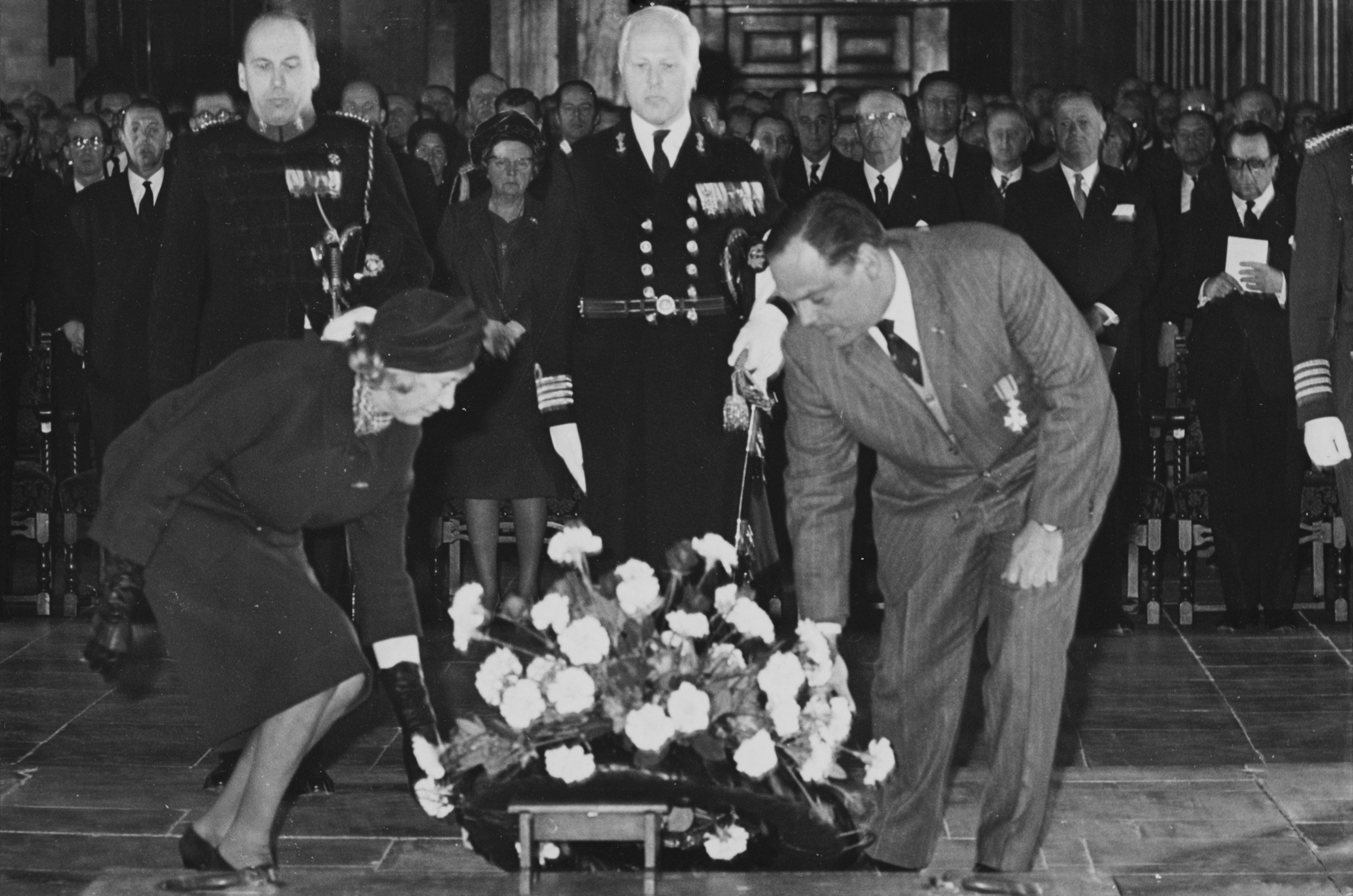
Wreath laying on behalf of the Engelandvaarders by Ida Veldhuyzen van Zanten and Tazelaar during the interment of Queen Wilhelmina in the Nieuwe Kerk in Delft.

Van der Stok had devised a plan to pick up people in the occupied Netherlands by boat. After arriving in England, Hazelhoff Roelfzema worked out this plan and was instructed by Queen Wilhelmina and the British secret service to execute the plan under the name Contact Holland. The first officer who was put ashore by boat was Peter Tazelaar. On 23 November 1941, he dressed in a tuxedo in Scheveningen in preparation for landing. He pretended to be a drunk reveller and was able to slip past German sentries guarding the beach by the casino. Together with the parachute which had been previously dropped by radio operator Johannes ter Laak, he would establish radio contact with England. Little progress was achieved, however, because the radio was damaged during the drop. Tazelaar's second assignment was the transportation of two important people to England. Again, this did not work, because they proved too difficult to pick up in a boat. Various arrests made it too dangerous for Tazelaar to stay in the Netherlands. At the end of January 1942 he left with midshipman Gerard Dogger via the Van Niftrik escape route to Switzerland. Travelling via France, Spain and Portugal, they arrived in England in April 1942.

== Military William Order ==
After returning to England, Tazelaar was given a training command in Wales. In February 1943 he moved to Canada to be an instructor for the Dutch troops. At the end of 1943 he returned to England. He joined the National Fire Service and married an English woman Dodie Sherston in secret, as Dodie feared her father's disapproval as Tazelaar had some Indonesian heritage. The marriage did not last long and Sherston left him for Kas de Graaf, another Dutch resistance member. On 9 September 1944, Tazelaar received the highest Dutch military award, the Military William Order for his role in Contact Holland. Then he joined the BBO. BBO agents parachuted into occupied Netherlands on sabotage and espionage missions. In November 1944, Tazelaar and Lykele Faber parachuted into Friesland. They provided radio contact with England for six months.

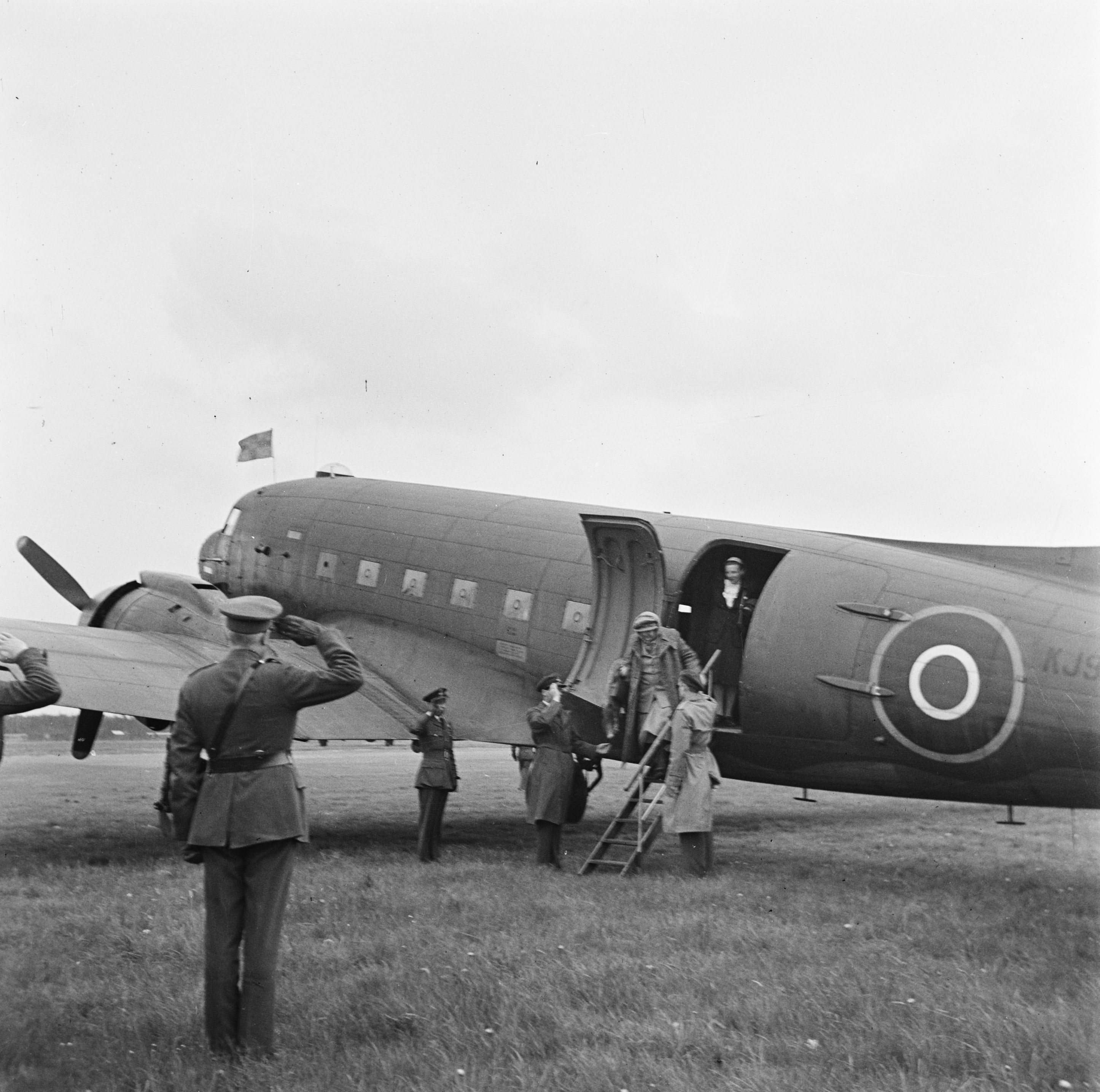
Peter Tazelaar (light coat) and Erik Hazelhoff Roelfzema (opposite him) as adjuncts to Queen Wilhelmina on her return to the continent, 2 May 1945

== Aide to Queen Wilhelmina ==
In April 1945 Tazelaar was appointed adjutant to Queen Wilhelmina. He accompanied her on her return to the Netherlands. A film shot at the time shows him arriving at Gilze-Rijen Air Base with Erik Hazelhoff Roelfzema. For the next six weeks he assisted the queen while residing with her, her daughter Princess Juliana, and two other adjuncts in her temporary quarters at Anneville near Breda. At the time the country north of the rivers was still controlled by the Germans, and it was this portion of the country that had suffered through the Hunger Winter of 1944–45. It was Tazelaar who informed Wilhelmina of the German surrender.

== Asia ==
In August 1945 Tazelaar transferred to Ceylon to participate in the fight against Japan. He served in the same unit as Raymond Westerling. Tazelaar went independently to the Dutch East Indies. His mother lived there in a Japanese internment camp for women and children, Tjideng, in Java. Tazelaar joined the military police and was involved in the detection and interrogation of Indonesian freedom fighters. In March 1946 he was wounded and returned to the Netherlands. That year he married for the second time.

== Later life ==
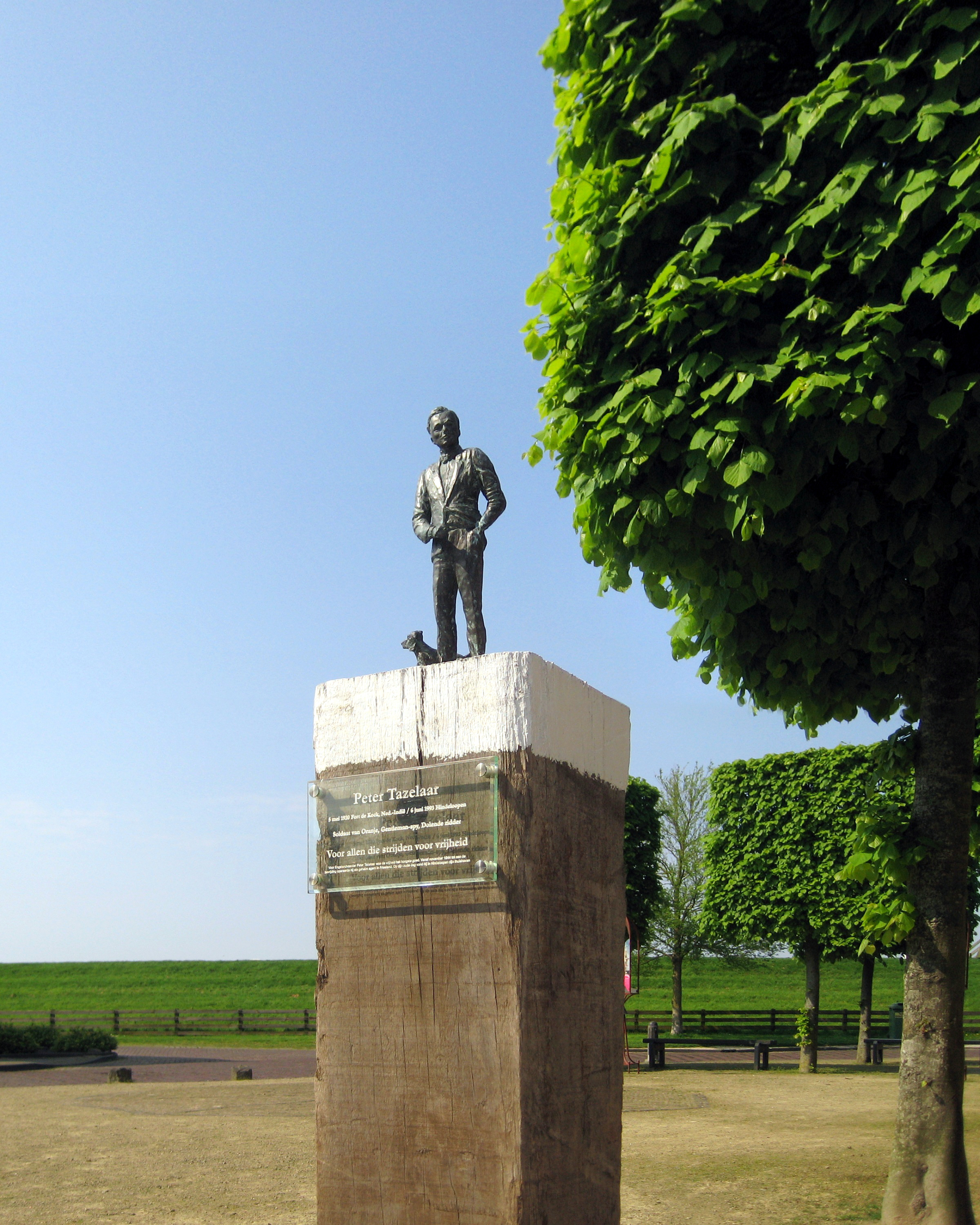
Memorial for Peter Tazelaar in Hindeloopen (2014)

Tazelaar led an adventurous life after the war while working for KLM and Shell. In total, he married four times. He became known to the Dutch public after the release of the book Soldier of Orange and the subsequent 1977 film Soldier of Orange. Tazelaar died on 6 June 1993 at Hindeloopen.

Among Tazelaar's relatives was the journalist and media proprietor Derk Sauer, who was his first cousin once removed.
