= SS St. Cergue =

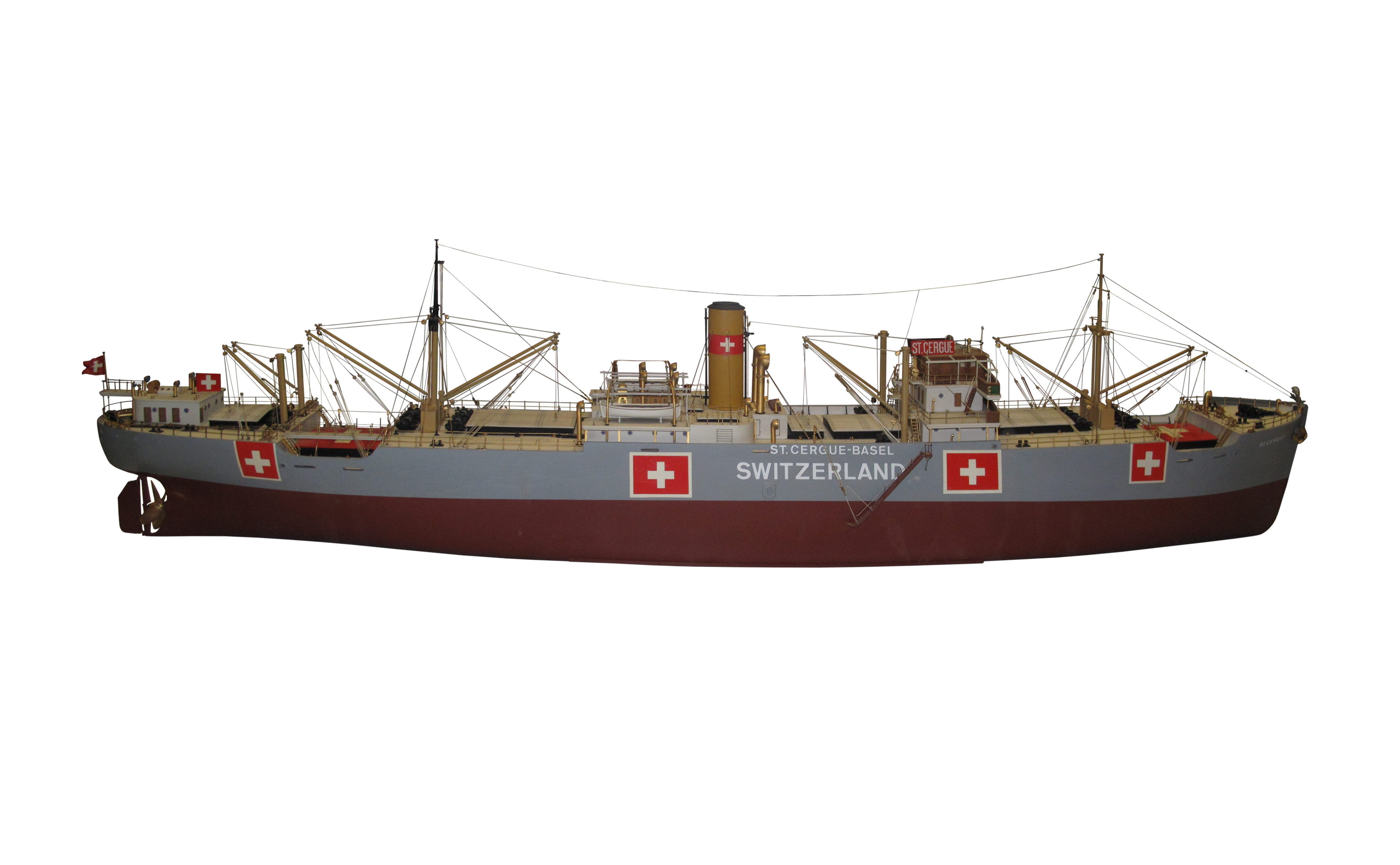
- Model of the Swiss cargo ship SS St. Cergue with her war markings during the Second World War, on display at the Swiss Museum of Transport.

History

United Kingdom
- Name: Felldene
- Owner: Felldene Shipping Co. Ltd. (Dene Shipmanagement Co. Ltd.), London
- Yard number: 1074
- Launched: 13 February 1937
- Completed: March 1937

History

Switzerland
- Name: St. Cergue
- Namesake: Saint-Cergue
- Owner: Demaurex & Pasche (Andre et Cie.), Panama (1939); Suisse-Atlantique Soc. de Nav. Maritime, Basel (1941)
- Acquired: 1939

History

Germany
- Name: Claus Bischoff
- Owner: Claus Bischof, R. Bornhofen & H. Bischoff, Hamburg (1951); Heinr. Bischoff Schiff. u. Hafenbetr. GmbH, Hamburg (1956); Heinrich Bischiff Reederei, Hamburg (1959)
- Acquired: 1951
- Fate: Broken up, 18 June 1962

General characteristics
- Type: Cargo ship
- Tonnage: 4260
- Length: 385.5 ft (117.50 m)
- Beam: 53.2 ft 3 in (16.29 m)
- Propulsion: Triple-expansion Compound engine, 289 HP
- Speed: 9 knots

SS St. Cergue was a Swiss cargo ship, originally the British merchant ship Felldene. She served in the Merchant Marine of Switzerland during the Second World War, notably rescuing survivors of several ships sunk by submarines.

== Career ==
=== Second World War ===
In June 1941, she gave passage from Schiedam to New York City to the Dutch Resistance fighters Peter Tazelaar, Bram van der Stok and Erik Hazelhoff Roelfzema.

On 6 April 1942, St. Cergue rescued the crew of the Norwegian tanker Koll, sunk by U-571.

On 26 June 1942, St. Cergue rescued the crew of the Dutch liner Jagersfontein, sunk by U-107.

On 25 March 1943, St. Cergue rescued survivors of the Swedish cargo Industria, sunk by U-518.

In late September 1943, St. Cergue rescued the Portuguese steamer Mello, victim of an accidental fire, and managed to tow her to Recife.

The 1977 film Soldier of Orange features St. Cergue, played by the French tanker Esso Port Jérôme, modified for the occasion.
