= Herman Bernard Wiardi Beckman =

Dutch politician (1904-1945)

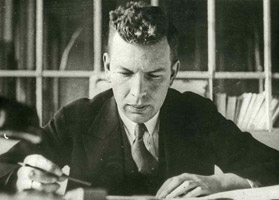
- Wiardi Beckman in the 1930s

Member of the Senate
- In office 8 June 1937 – 10 May 1940

Personal details
- Born: 4 February 1904 Nijmegen
- Died: 15 March 1945 (aged 41) Dachau concentration camp
- Party: SDAP
- Spouse: Maria Petronella Margaretha "Riet" Wackie Eijsten (m. 1927)
- Children: 3
- Education: Leiden University

Herman Bernard "Stuuf" Wiardi Beckman (4 February 1904 - 15 March 1945) was a Dutch politician, writer and resistance fighter. Born into the Dutch elite, Wiardi Beckman became an influential figure within the Social Democratic Workers' Party (SDAP), serving as a member of the Senate from 1937 to 1940. During World War II, he joined the Dutch resistance, was captured by the Germans after a failed attempt by Erik Hazelhoff Roelfzema to bring him to England in 1942, and died in Dachau concentration camp in March 1945. The Wiardi Beckman Stichting, the Labour Party (PvdA)'s think tank, is named after him.

== Early life ==
Herman Bernard Wiardi Beckman was born on 4 February 1904 in Nijmegen to neurologist Jacob Wiardi Beckman and Everdina Suzanna Kuenen. His family had a background within the Dutch elite and a strong interest in cultural and intellectual topics. During his youth, he became interested in left-wing politics due to his respect for SDAP leader Pieter Jelles Troelstra and friendship with Marinus van der Goes van Naters, both of whom had been members of the Practical Idealists Association, a student group advocating for societal change, and were attracted by socialism's revolutionary potential. At the age of 18, he joined the Social Democratic Workers' Party (SDAP).

After finishing his secondary education in Nijmegen, Wiardi Beckman studied history at Leiden University, where he was influenced by the ideas of historian Johan Huizinga, under whom he studied. He joined a student fraternity in Leiden and became a member of the Social Democratic student organisation. After graduating in 1927, he attended a school for infantry officers in Kampen, where his socialist ideas and refusal to take an officer's oath brought him into conflict with his commander. He leveraged his connections within the Social Democratic student organisation in Leiden to become the personal secretary of Pieter Jelles Troelstra, writing the last parts of his memoirs after Troelstra's death in 1930. He then spent a year in France writing his dissertation on French syndicalism, obtaining his PhD in history under Johan Huizinga at Leiden University in 1931.

== Political career ==
Having been widely praised for his work on Troelstra's memoirs, Wiardi Beckman became an assistant editor of the social democratic newspaper Het Vrije Volk in 1932, focusing on local politics in Amsterdam, and worked as head editor from 1937 to 1940. In 1937, he also became head editor at De Arbeiderspers.

In 1932, Wiardi Beckman had refused an offer by SDAP leader Johan Willem Albarda, who considered him one of the most able potential leaders in the party, to be placed on the SDAP's electoral list for the House of Representatives. He did participate in several commissions, including one on comparative political systems in 1933 and he was appointed to a committee on renewal of the party programme in 1935 by Albarda due to his forward-thinking ideas. Wiardi Beckman sought to reform the SDAP from a partially revolutionary class-based party into a people's party, focused not only on the working class but also small farmers, the middle class and other groups victimized by capitalism. Facing the looming threat of fascism and National Socialism, the SDAP would commit itself to the Dutch system of parliamentary democracy and reconcile with the idea of the Dutch nation. The SDAP would therefore also accept Dutch national symbols, including the Dutch flag, the Wilhelmus and the Dutch monarchy, as well as Dutch traditions of tolerance and freedom of conscience. In addition, Wiardi Beckman was inspired by Jean Jaurès' idea of the nouvelle armée, meaning that the social democratic movement would commit itself to the defence of the nation. In doing so, the SDAP would be able to end the period of political isolation which it had occupied since its founding and appeal to a broader range of voters. In 1937, these ideas became an official part of the SDAP's ideological programme and would form the basis of the principles on which the post-World War II Labour Party (PvdA) would be founded.

In 1937, Wiardi Beckman became a member of the Senate for the SDAP. In the Senate, he opposed increasing military funding because of government inaction on the persistent class differences in Dutch society. However, he simultaneously vigorously combatted the rise of authoritarian ideologies. Wiardi Beckman saw democracy as an essential part of socialism and thus spoke out forcefully against both fascism and communism. He publicly committed himself to taking his responsibility and joining the military if the need ever arose.

== World War II ==
On 10 May 1940, the day of the German invasion, Wiardi Beckman resigned his seat in the Senate to serve as an officer in the Dutch army. He assisted in the writing of General Henri Winkelman's radio announcement on 15 May 1940 announcing the capitulation of the Dutch armed forces, and held a speech at the Grebbeberg on 20 May to commemorate the fallen Dutch soldiers.

During the first months of the occupation, Wiardi Beckman sought to encourage the Dutch population to fight Nazi societal influence and defeatist rhetoric by using legal means, such as holding a lecture in September 1940 in support of the pre-war democratic system. However, he quickly became involved in the Dutch resistance, participating in the illegal SDAP and the resistance newspaper Het Parool, serving as an occasional editor for the paper.

Fearing anti-democratic tendencies within the Dutch resistance, Koos Vorrink, one of the head editors of Het Parool, had written up a memorandum which had made its way to the Dutch government-in-exile in London, where it was believed to have been written by Wiardi Beckman. When the government-in-exile was preparing a plan to clandestinely bring over people from the Netherlands to provide them with further information about the situation there and possibly join the Second Gerbrandy cabinet, Wiardi Beckman was one of the prime candidates. Despite his socialist ideology, his elite family background, pro-monarchy stance and intimate knowledge of affairs in the occupied Netherlands made him an attractive target. Queen Wilhelmina personally selected him as one of two people along with Paul Maria Hubert Tielens, a military officer, to be brought over to England by a group led by Erik Hazelhoff Roelfzema and Pieter Tazelaar, who was supposed to pick them up on the beach of Scheveningen.

On 23 November, Tazelaar was successfully dropped off near Scheveningen, tasked with finding Wiardi Beckman and Tielens and bringing the two back to the Scheveningen beach on the night of 25 and 26 November. While Tielens refused citing an oath he had taken swearing not to fight the German occupation, Wiardi Beckman agreed and went along with Tazelaar to the beach on 25 November. This first attempt failed, however, after the boat meant to bring them to England steered off course despite the good weather and ended up near Hoek van Holland instead.

Between 9 December 1941 and 5 January 1942, eight more attempts by Hazelhoff Roelfzema would be made to bring Wiardi Beckman over to Britain, each unsuccessful. On 9 December, Tazelaar, Wiardi Beckman and resistance fighter Gerard Dogger, replacing Tielens, had waited on the Scheveningen beach until 11 pm, but the motorboat arrived nearly half an hour late after having almost sunk due to bad weather, with Hazelhoff Roelfzema and his group leaving at 1 am without his intended passengers. Further attempts throughout December and early January failed due to weather, Hazelhoff Roelfzema's boat arriving at the wrong place or nobody arriving at the designated time.

One last attempt to transport Wiardi Beckman would be undertaken on 17 January. His secret invitation had leaked out, and Het Parool editor Frans Goedhart had managed to secure himself a spot on the boat to England over the initial objections of Vorrink, along with Willem Pasdeloup, another resistance member. However, the Germans had been informed that a group of people would attempt to leave by boat that night, and when the party of five reached the beach Wiardi Beckman, Goedhart and Pasdeloup were arrested. After his arrest, Wiardi Beckman managed to conceal much of his resistance activities. He was shuffled around various camps, including one in Haaren in North Brabant, Natzweiler concentration camp and eventually Dachau. On 15 March 1945, Wiardi Beckman died of typhus there.

== Personal life ==
Wiardi Beckman married Maria Petronella Margaretha "Riet" Wackie Eijsten in 1927. The couple had three daughters together. He was known as a somewhat shy and unspontaneous person who had some trouble connecting with the working class base of the SDAP, but also as a free-thinking, socially-minded, courageous and highly principled person who would likely have become an important politician had he survived World War II.

He also maintained an extramarital affair with Annekee van Oldenborgh-Van der Sande, the wife of his neighbour and friend Willem van Oldenborgh, who in turn would have an affair with Wiardi Beckman's wife Riet. Throughout the first few years of the war, the two would frequently exchange letters. In 1943, Annekee visited Wiardi Beckman in a prison camp in Haaren and broke up with him.

He was a member of the Remonstrant Brotherhood.

== Bibliography ==
- de Jong, Louis (1974), Het Koninkrijk der Nederlanden in de Tweede Wereldoorlog. Deel 5: Maart '41 - juli '42, 's-Gravenhage: M. Nijhoff, ISBN 978-90-247-1641-8
