= Anneville (Ulvenhout) =

Estate in North Brabant, Netherlands

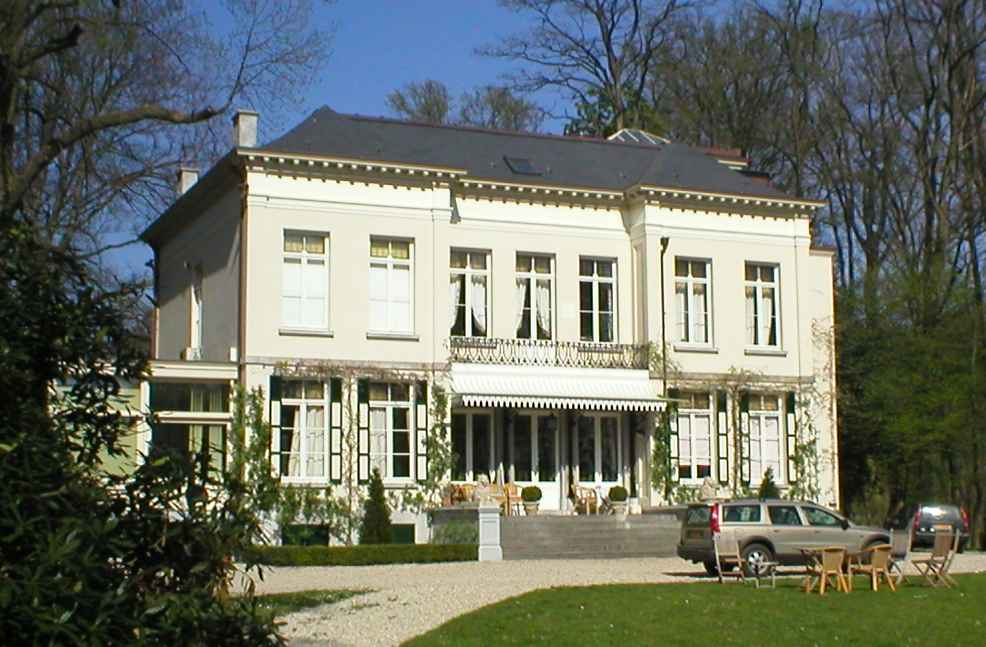
- Anneville in 2003

- Location within Netherlands
- 51°32′35.70″N 04°49′14.70″E
- Location: Ulvenhout

History
- Built: 1851

Site notes
- Architect: Antoine Trappeniers

Anneville is an estate in Ulvenhout in the Dutch province of North Brabant. It is located just south of the city of Breda. It is a small country estate, best known for being the temporary residence of Queen Wilhelmina of the Netherlands when she first returned to the Netherlands near the end of World War II.

== History ==
Anneville was founded by the famous Dutch archeologist and historian Prosper Cuypers van Velthoven, who built his country estate there in the neighborhood of Geersbroek south of Breda and just southeast of Ulvenhout. The estate was named after his wife, Anna van Velthoven. The land was originally a group of ten small farms, which were purchased by Velthoven over a few years, with the first purchase made in 1845. The properties were combined to form a suitable estate to surround a large country house. Cadastral records indicate a number of small houses and sheds had stood within the current park area. Construction on the house commenced in 1851 and was completed in 1852. The manor house was designed by architect Antoine Trappeniers. Some 40 years later in 1898 a coach house was added to the grounds, built by Prosper Cuypers' son, Edouard van Velthoven.

After the marriage of his son Edouard in 1862, Prosper Cuypers and his wife moved out of the house and returned to Brussels. He continued his work on history there, while his son and his new wife moved in to the manor house at Anneville. For his career recording Belgium history he was awarded the Leopoldsorde in 1868. The house continued to be used as a residence for the Velthoven family until the 1920s. In the 1930s Anneville was rented out to the Bredase hotelier Coumans, who converted Anneville into a hotel, restaurant and tea house.

The house lies in the woods of Ulvenhout. A row of beeches line the approach to the estate. Its driveway curves around a lawn where stone steps rise to a small portico. In the back high glass doors open on to a veranda that looks out over gardens and the Brabant countryside. Two ponds are surrounded by wide lawns, tall trees, walking paths and clusters of flowering rhododendrons.

During the German occupation in World War II the estate was requisitioned by the Germans. About 1.5 hectares (roughly 4 acres) of the surrounding woods were harvested, and outdoor ovens were set up on the grounds around the coach house. These were used to bake bread. After the region was liberated in October 1944 the mayor of Ulvenhout claimed the house for Prince Bernhard, who was the acting commander of the Dutch resistance. He took residence there 19 November 1944 while he set up his headquarters in nearby Breda. He occupied the estate until May 1945, when he vacated the premises for Queen Wilhelmina.

Queen Wilhelmina arrived at Anneville on 2 May 1945. With her was her daughter Princess Juliana, and adjuncts Peter Tazelaar, Erik Hazelhoff Roelfzema and Rie Stokvis. The three adjuncts were not from the royal household, but all three had been Engelandvaarders. Their presence was a part of the Queen's effort to decrease the barrier between the royal family and the people. Though Anneville was a serene and stately manor house, it was a far cry from the palace at Het Loo, and symbolized a formal break from the highly formalistic and class conscious existence the royal family had been confined to before the war. While the Queen was in residence the ground floor of the coach house served as a motor garage, while the rooms above the garage housed the small guard detail.

Anneville was the scene of a number of spontaneous gatherings of the people of the Netherlands. When the people of Breda and the surrounding communities learned the Queen was present they gathered there to greet here, and a spontaneous procession filed past the house to greet their queen. Soon after the Queen's arrival she learned from Peter Tazelaar that Germany had surrendered. It was a time of great joy in the Netherlands. In late June the Queen's stay at Anneville concluded. On 20 June 1945 a party was held by the royal family as a thanks to the local people.

The Queen's stay at Anneville had lasted for a little over 6 weeks. During this brief period of time Anneville had become the centre of the Netherlands. She confided later that her time at Anneville was the happiest period of her reign. She reportedly told Hazelhoff at their last meeting "Anneville... Dat was onze sprookjestijd." (Anneville ... That was our fairy-tale time.)

After the Queen vacated the building it was put back into use as a hotel, restaurant and tea shop. It remained so from 1946 until 1955, and was used for staff meetings, business courses and conferences. A number of the Benelux treaties were signed at Anneville in the first half of the 1950s. After that, it was rented in succession by Thomsen's United Port Authority in Rotterdam and the Outward Bound School Netherlands.

In 1992, the house was renovated and rented out for use as an office and residence. In 1998 the coach house was restored and renovated to make a conference and wedding hall, the "Koetshuis Anneville". The main house is still being used as a residence for the owner, whose family run the operation of the "Koetshuis Anneville" meeting place.

== Anneville gallery ==
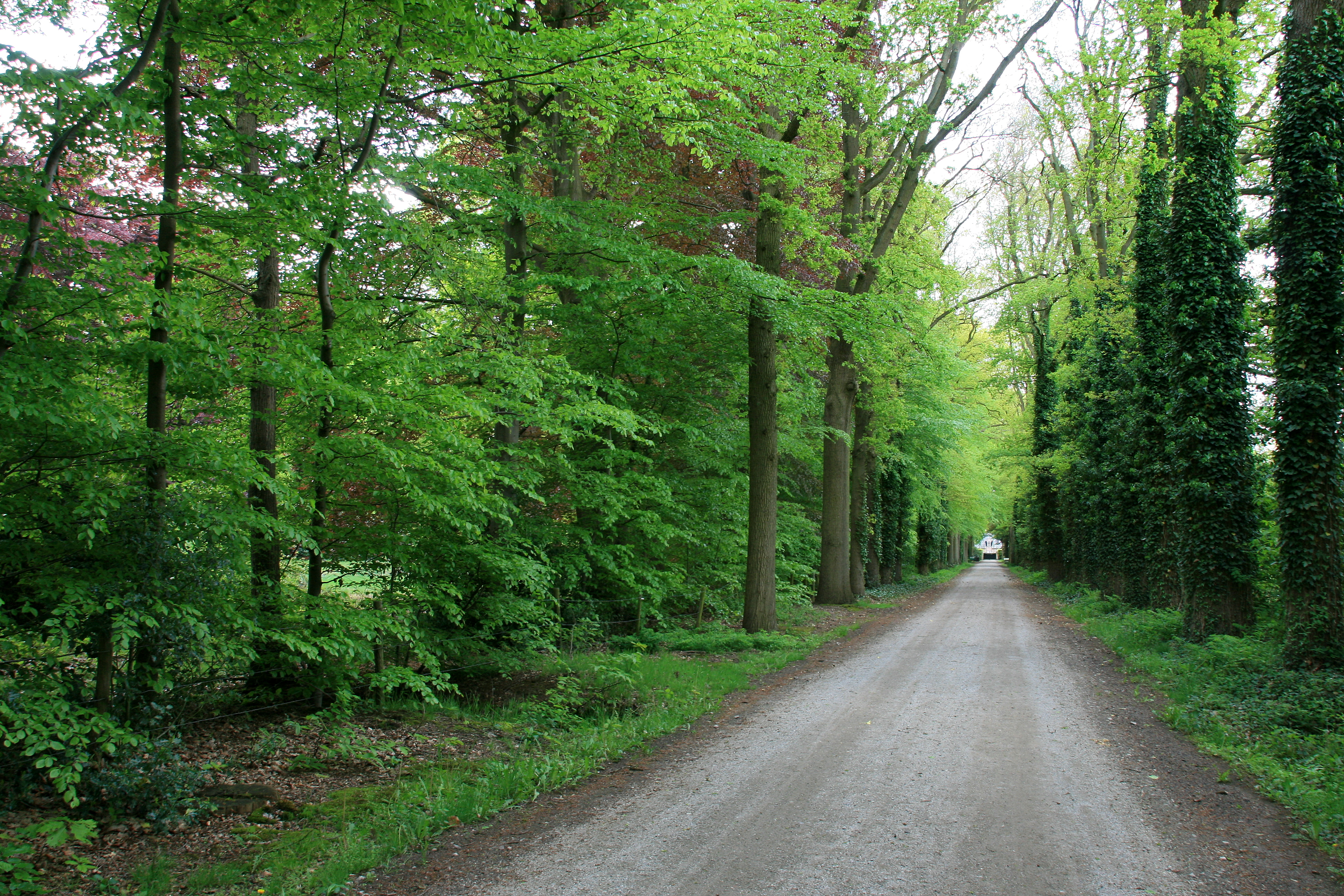
The approach to Anneville

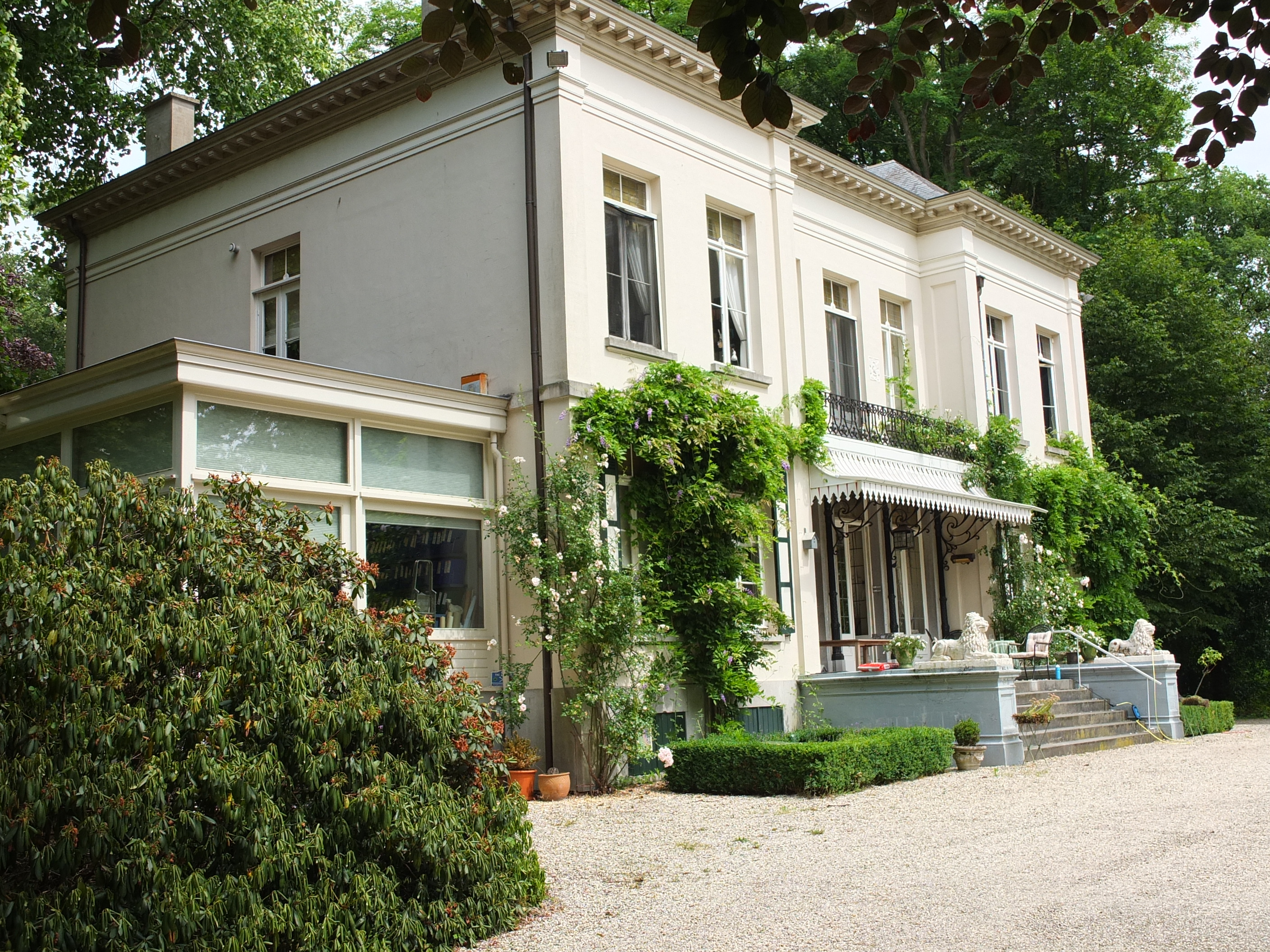
Front drive to the main house

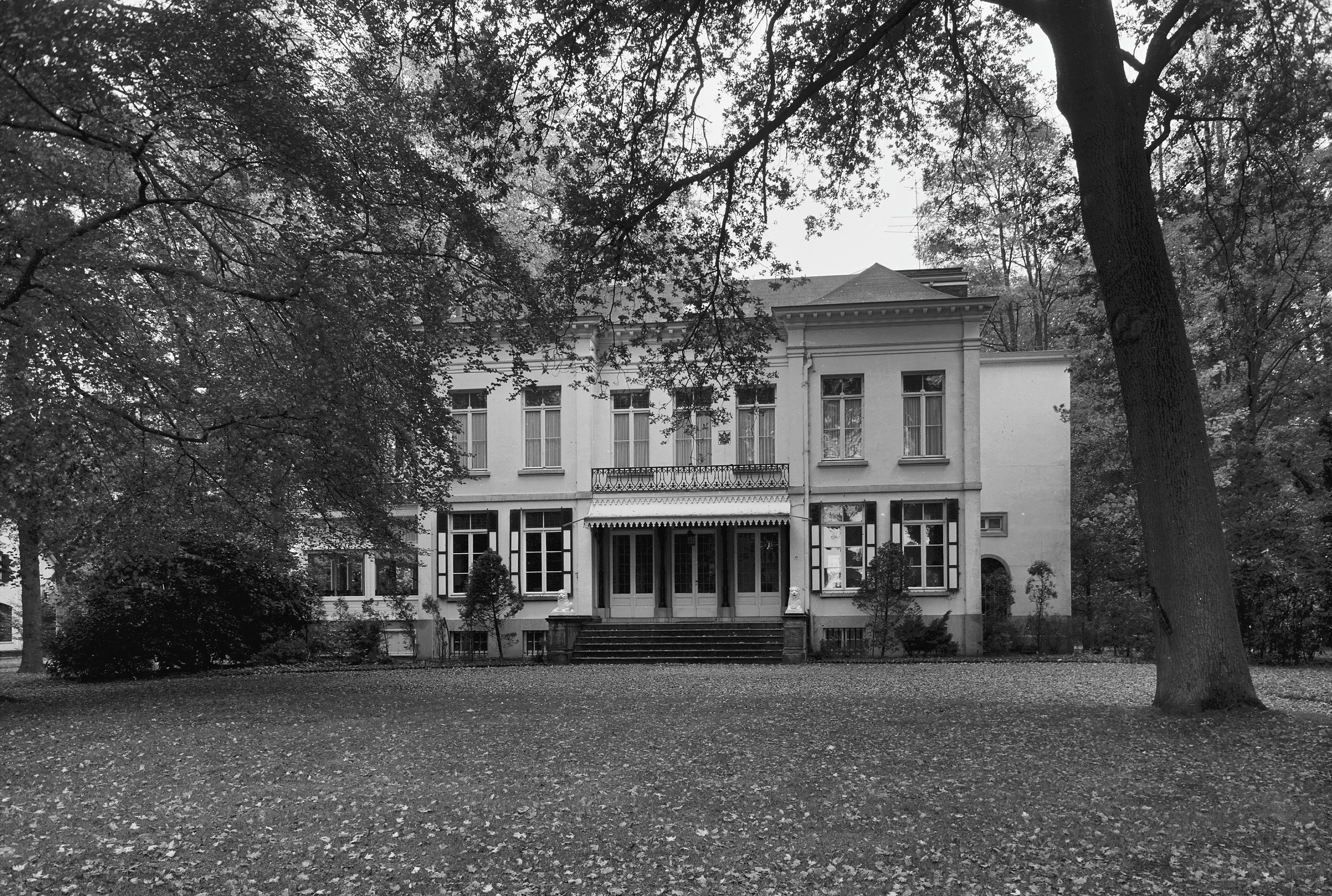
The front drive and portico

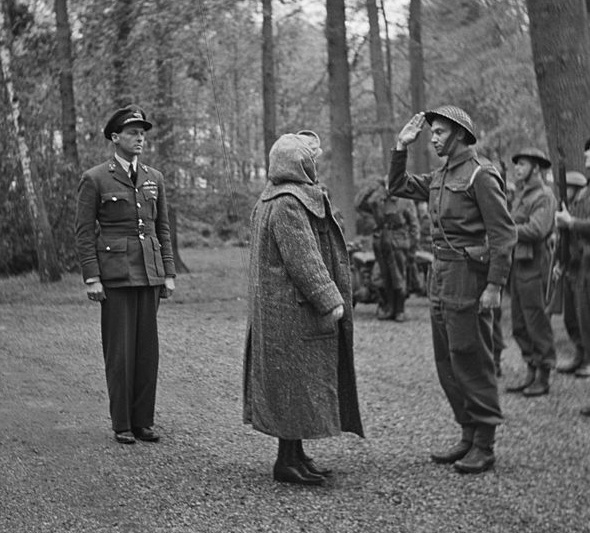
Queen Wilhelmina inspecting the honor guard directly in front of the villa upon her arrival there, 2 May 1945

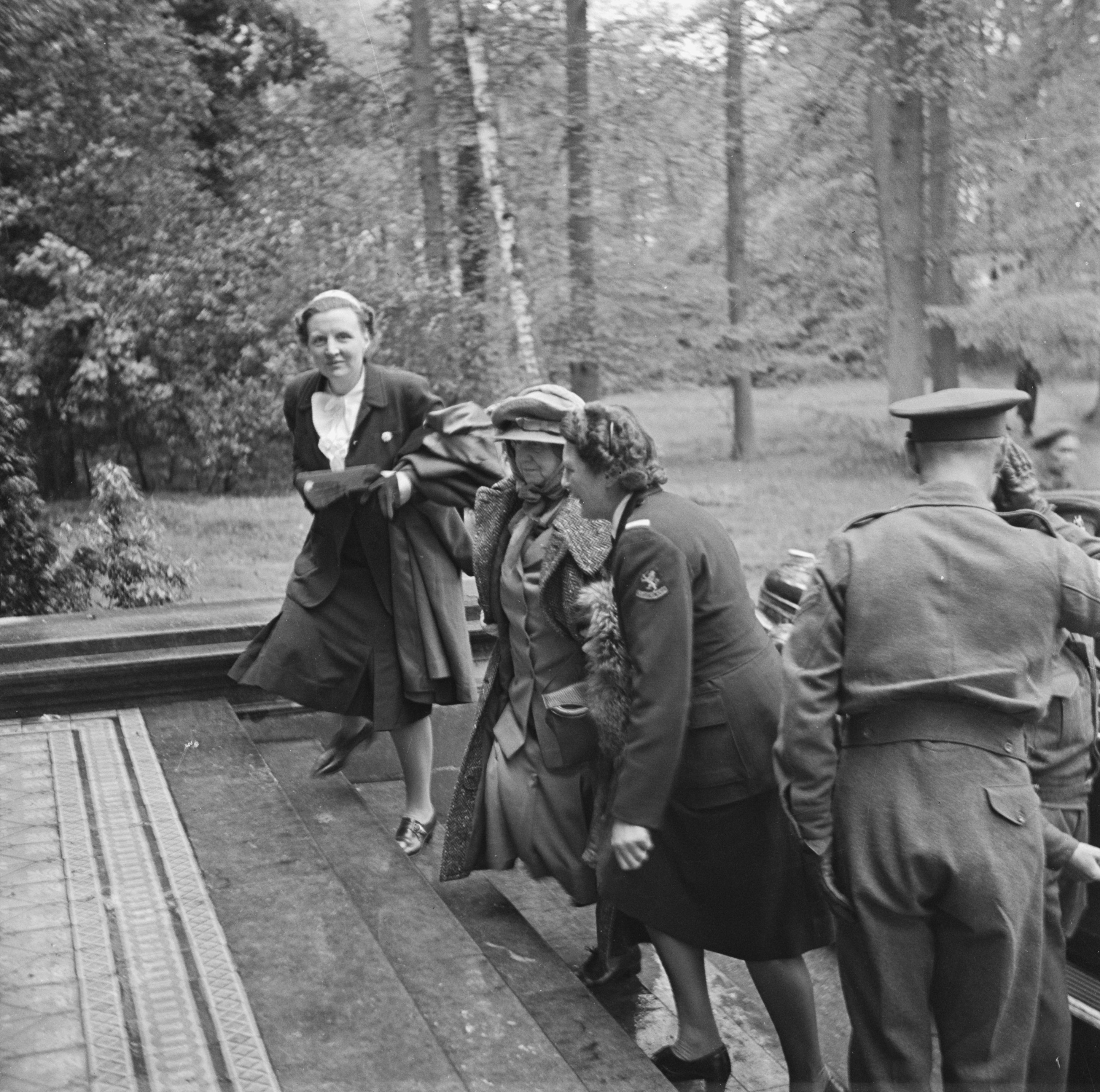
Princess Juliana, Queen Wilhelmina and Rie Stokvis climb the front steps upon their arrival

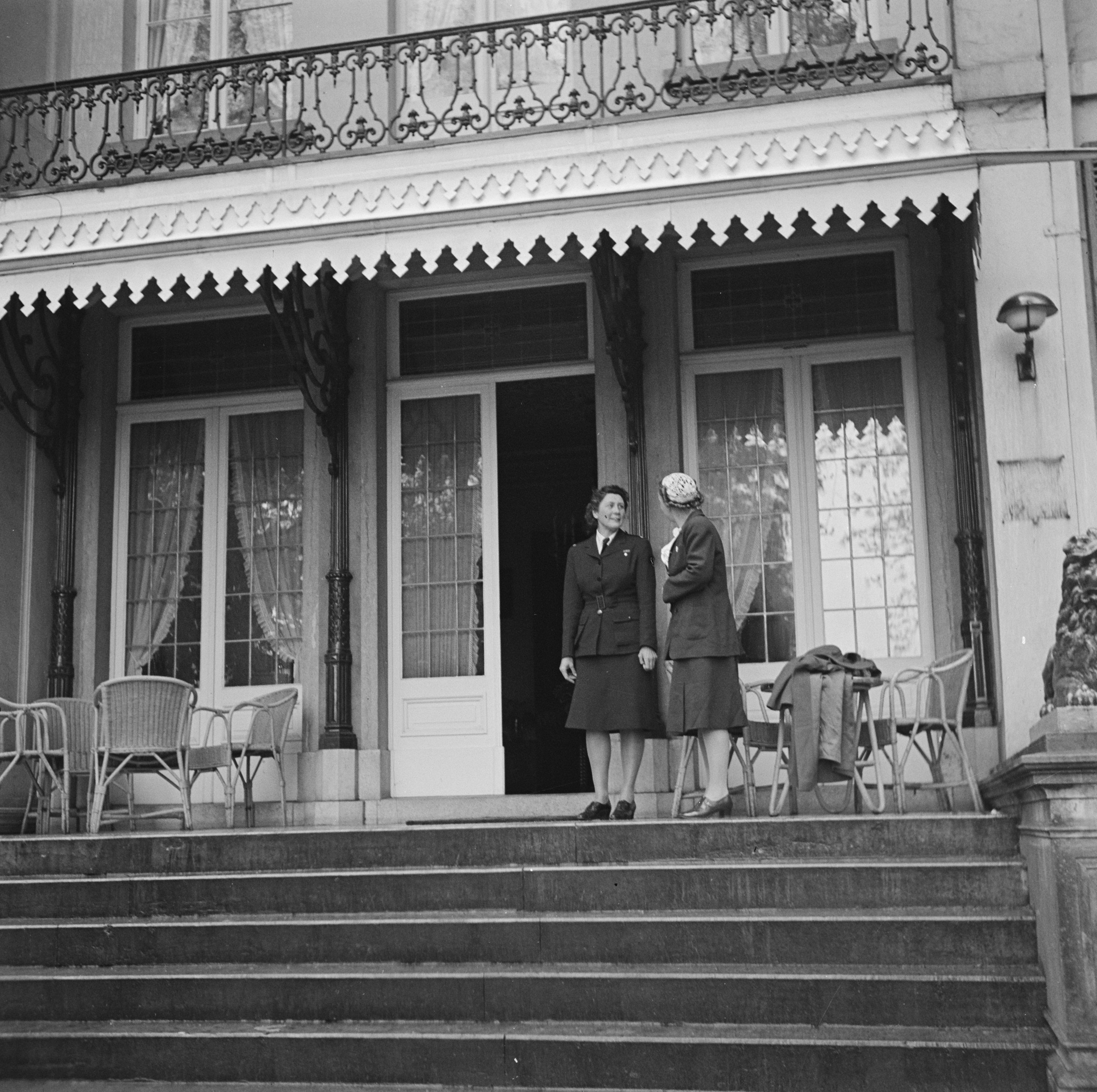
Princess Juliana (right) and her adjunct Rie Stokvis stand on the portico overlooking the front drive

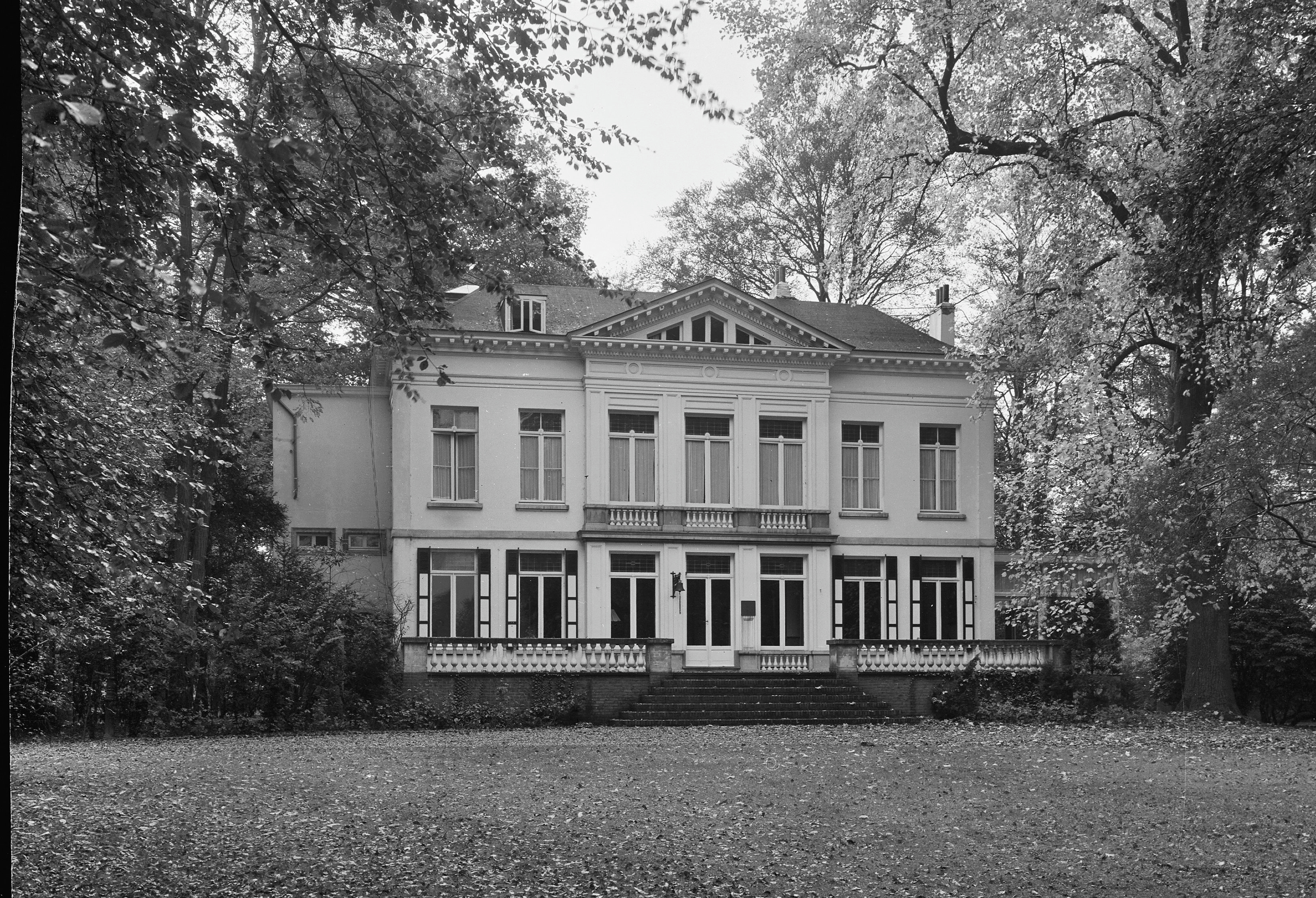
The veranda overlooking the gardens in the back of the house

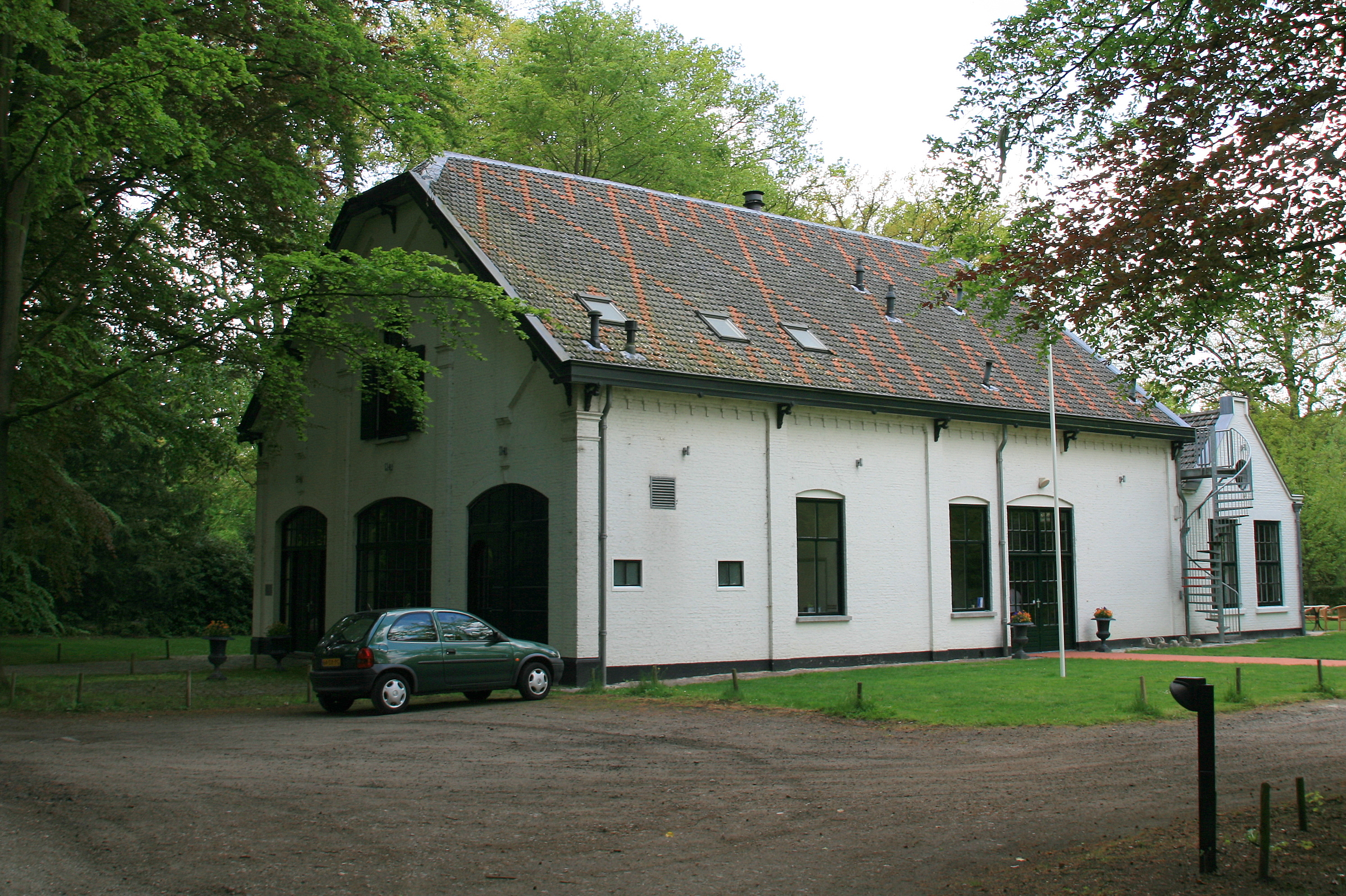
The coach house

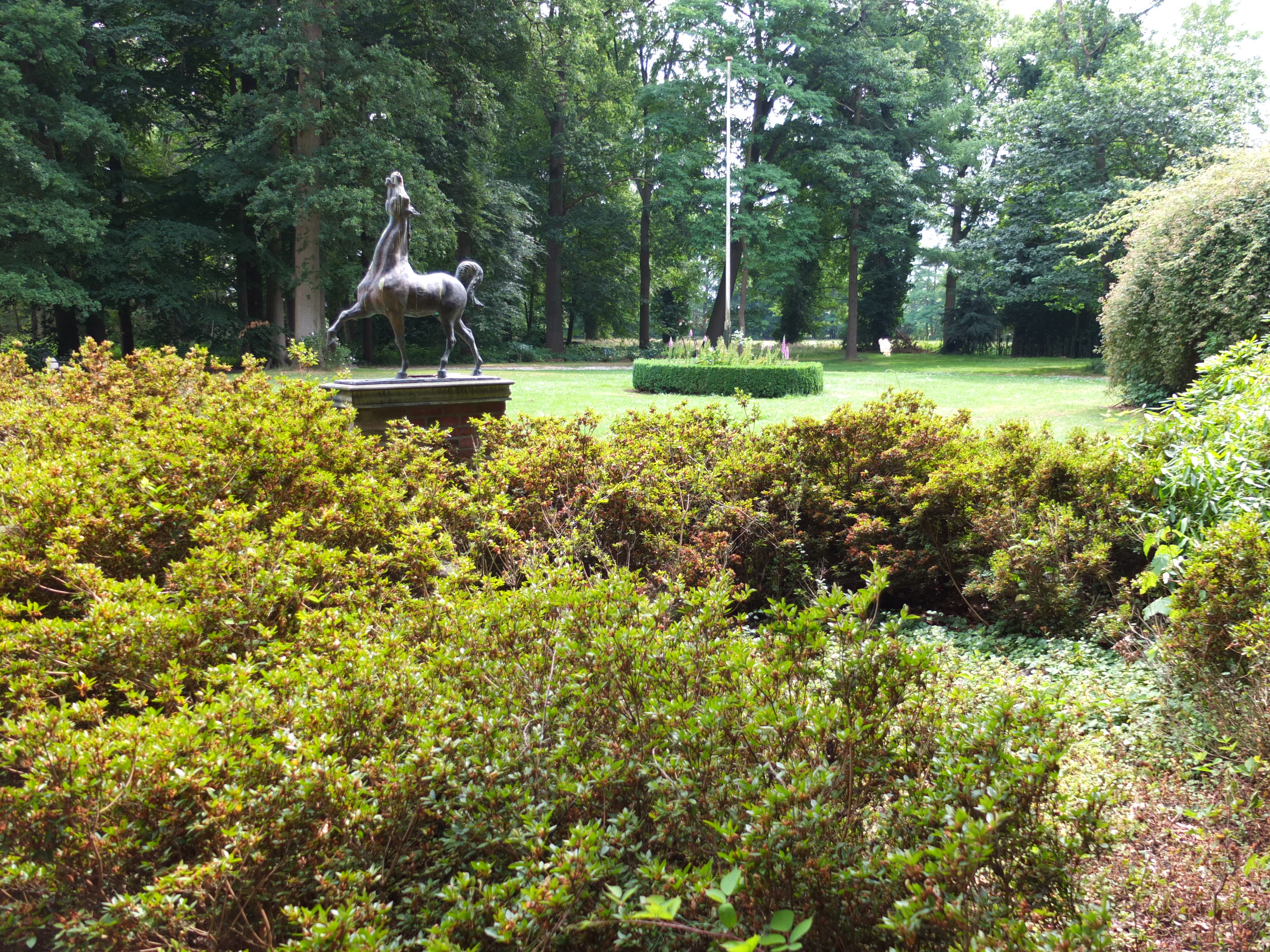
The grounds behind the house

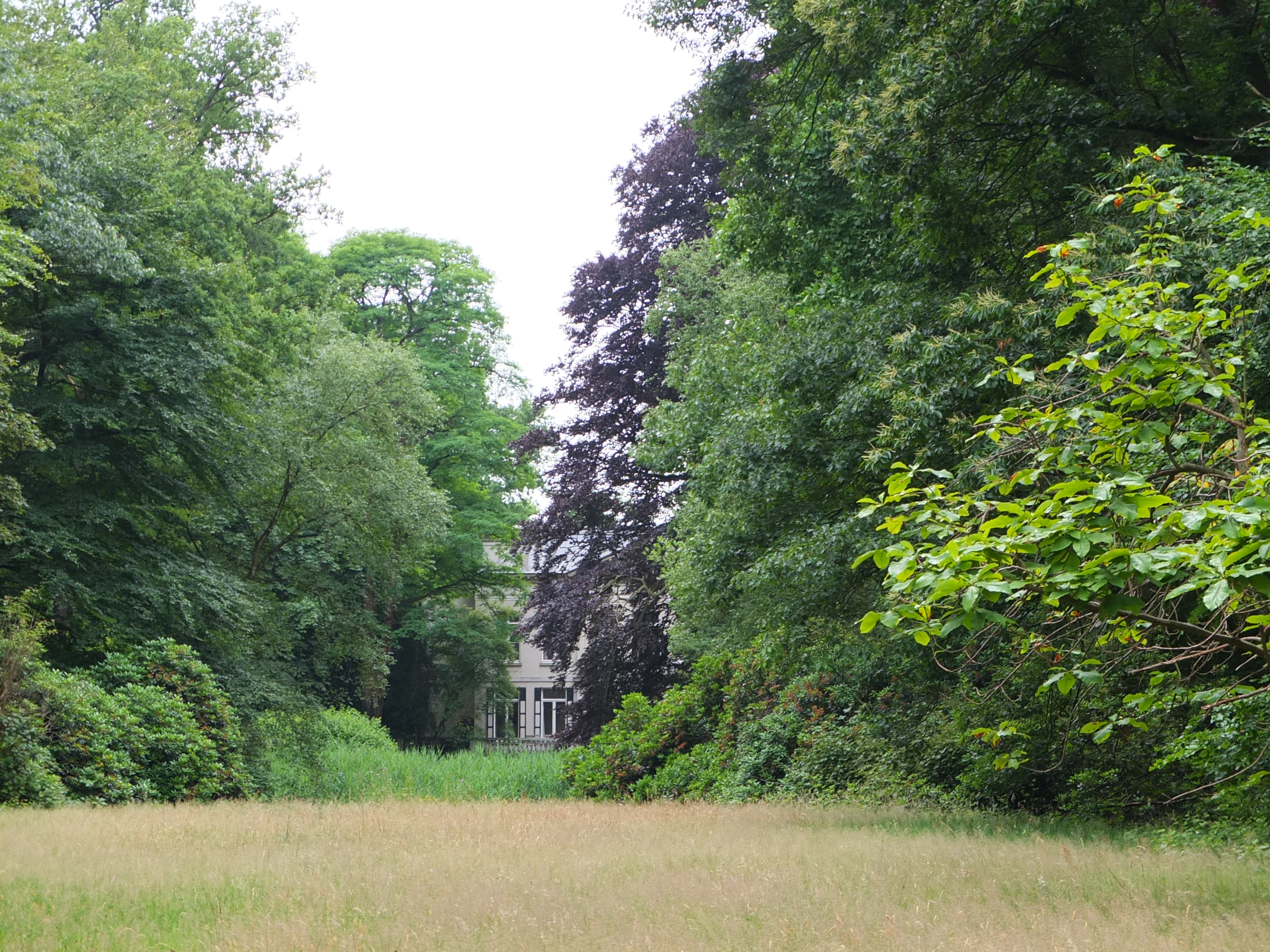
Back approach to the main house

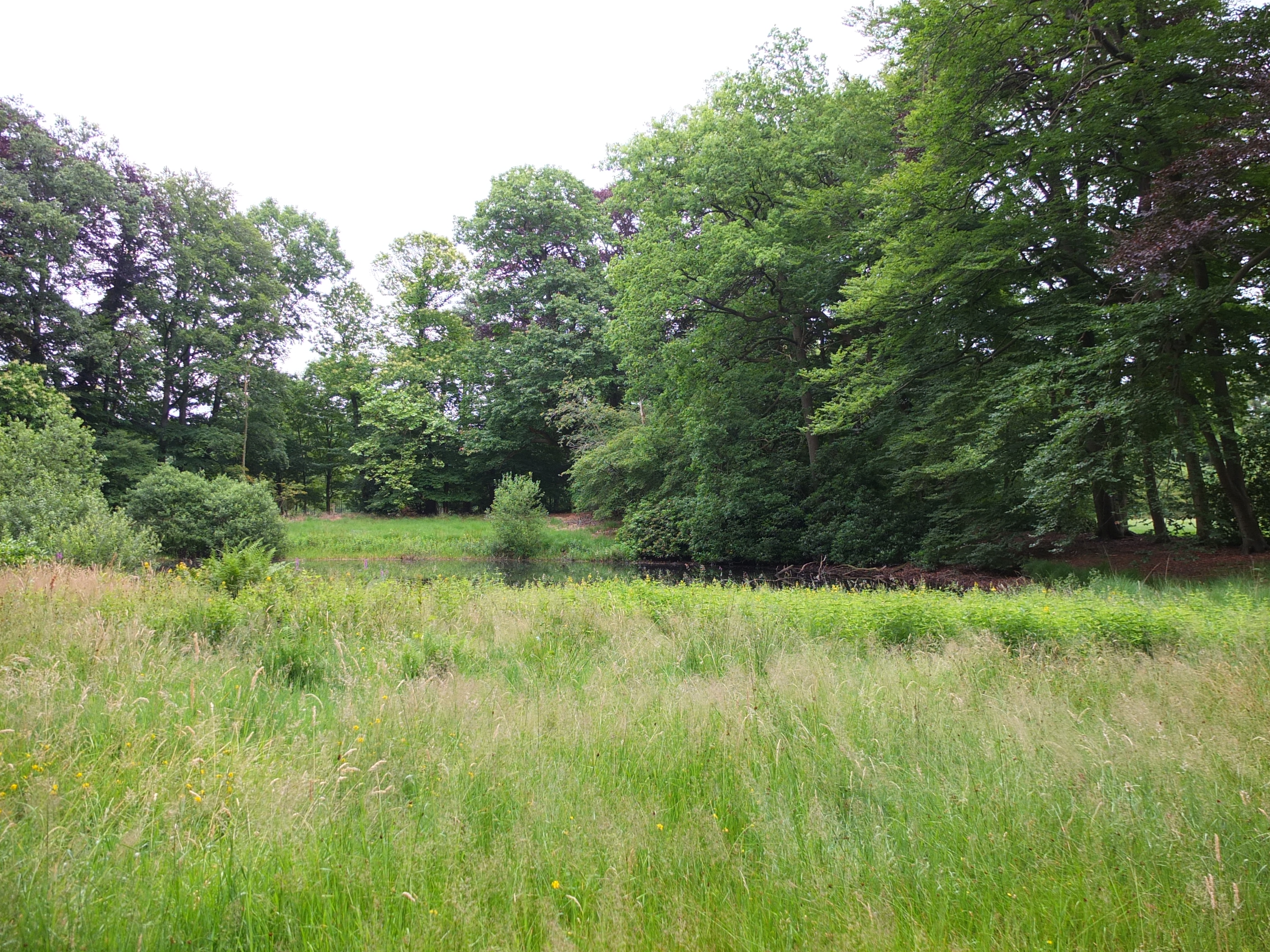
Overgrowth surrounds the two ponds behind Anneville

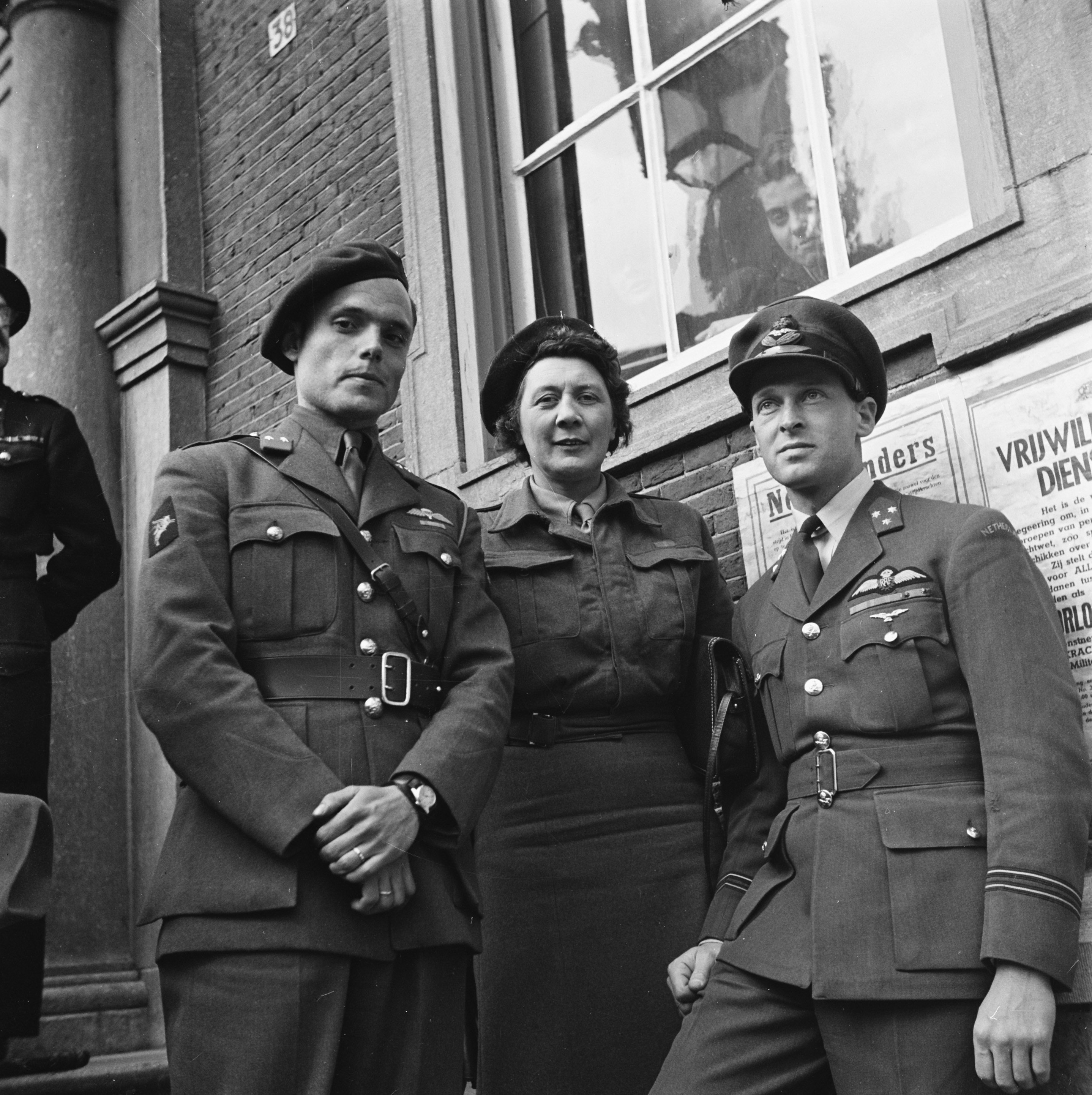
Peter Tazelaar, Rie Stokvis and Erik Hazelhoff Roelfzema, adjuncts to the queen and Princess Juliana, stand before the queen's temporary residence, 2 May 1945

== See also ==
- Anneville Estate Ulvenhout
- Koetshuis Anneville
- Brekelmans, F.A. Prosper Cuypers van Velthoven en het landgoed "Anneville" Jaarboek "De Oranjeboom", 1983 (NL) (Prosper Cuypers of Velthoven and the estate "Anneville"; Yearbook "The Orange Tree", 1983).
