= Sytze van der Zee =

Dutch writer and journalist (1939–2024)

- Born: 25 July 1939; Hilversum, Netherlands
- Died: 5 November 2024 (aged 85); Amstelveen, Netherlands
- Occupations: Writer, journalist

Sytze van der Zee (25 July 1939 – 5 November 2024) was a Dutch writer and journalist.

Van der Zee was the editor-in-chief of Het Parool from 1988 to 1996. As a writer he wrote extensively about World War II, including 25.000 landverraders: de SS in Nederland, Nederland in de SS (1967) about the Dutch people who fought on the German side during the war. Other notable of his books are De overkant. Mijn jaren bij Het Parool (1998) about his fight against the cuts at Het Parool and Harer Majesteits loyaalste onderdaan (2015). Videoland made a television series about his book Anatomie van een seriemoordenaar - het beest van Harkstede (2006).

Van der Zee died from metastatic lung cancer on 5 November 2024, at the age of 85.
