= ʻĀhualoa =

Unincorporated community in Hawaii, U.S.

Coordinates: 20.06°N 155.48°W

ʻĀhualoa is an unincorporated rural area along the Hāmākua Coast on the Island of Hawaiʻi in Hawaii County, Hawaii, United States. The Hawaiian language name is believed to mean "long mound", where ʻāhua means to swell, as a wave, heap, or mound, and loa means long.

== Geography ==
Āhualoa is located at 20°03' North, 155°28' West (20.06, -155.48).

The Old Māmalahoa Highway is the principal road running through Āhualoa. The land is zoned agricultural. A typical lot is 5 acres (2.0 ha) in size. Land use is for residence and small-scale agriculture, including farming, orchards and livestock.

== History ==
There is no record of Native Hawaiian settlement in the area that is now Āhualoa. It is likely that the Native Hawaiians visited the area for extraction of resources from the ʻōhiʻa lehua-hāpuʻu native forest, but did not live there, as wet forest was not considered a desirable place to live.

According to research for an archaeological survey in 2002, the area that is now Āhualoa:

appears to have been carved out of the upper reaches of at least four ahupuaʻa: Lauka, Kuliahaʻi, Koloaha, and Āhualoa. These are all relatively narrow and short land units that are cut off on the mauka sides by the larger ahupuaʻa of Nienie, which in turn is cut off on its mauka side by the ahupuaʻa of Pāʻauhau. [...] The forest zone in Hāmākua was traditionally a location for collecting wauke and māmaki bark for fish nets and cloth, for bird catching to obtain feathers, and for harvesting koa canoe logs.

The land of Āhualoa differs from many other parts of Hawaii in that it was never used for either sugarcane plantations or large-scale cattle ranching. Instead, in the late 19th and early 20th century it was allocated to families of sugarcane workers as farm homesteads, and remains largely so today. The families, primarily Japanese and Portuguese in ethnicity, were the first inhabitants of the area, and many of the present residents are descended from those families. The original native forest was cleared and replaced by a patchwork of pasture, farms and windbreaks. Small-scale ranching did occur, and included a slaughterhouse that operated for a century before closing in 2008. Āhualoa was also the location for early plantings of coffee, which is still being grown there today.

In the 1970s, many countercultural families from Oʻahu and the mainland US moved to the Āhualoa area. They brought values and ideals of the back-to-the-land movement. A book of material gathered in 2003, Once Upon Ahualoa, explores the experience of this generation with memories and photographs.

== Infrastructure ==
Although the main road through Āhualoa has services (electricity, water, telephone, cable internet), many residents living on side roads depend on rainwater tanks as a supply of water. During 2008–12, improvements were made to the water supply, supported by federal stimulus funding, including a new deep well at the top of Āhualoa, a 1 million gallon storage tank, and an upgrade of the main waterline to a 12" pipe.
