= SceneAround =

Theatrical performance system with rotating auditorium

SceneAround, also known under the brand name StageAround, is a type of theatrical performance or presentation invented by Robin de Levita and first premiered on 30 October 2010. It involves a revolving auditorium that rotates the seated audience around the different sets, so that they face the intended set stage for the current scene. Unlike more traditional forms, where sets are replaced and the audience remains in a fixed position in front of a single stage, in this method the audience rotates around the different stages in the middle and can usually only view the intended set for that scene, as the other sets are hidden.

== Origin ==
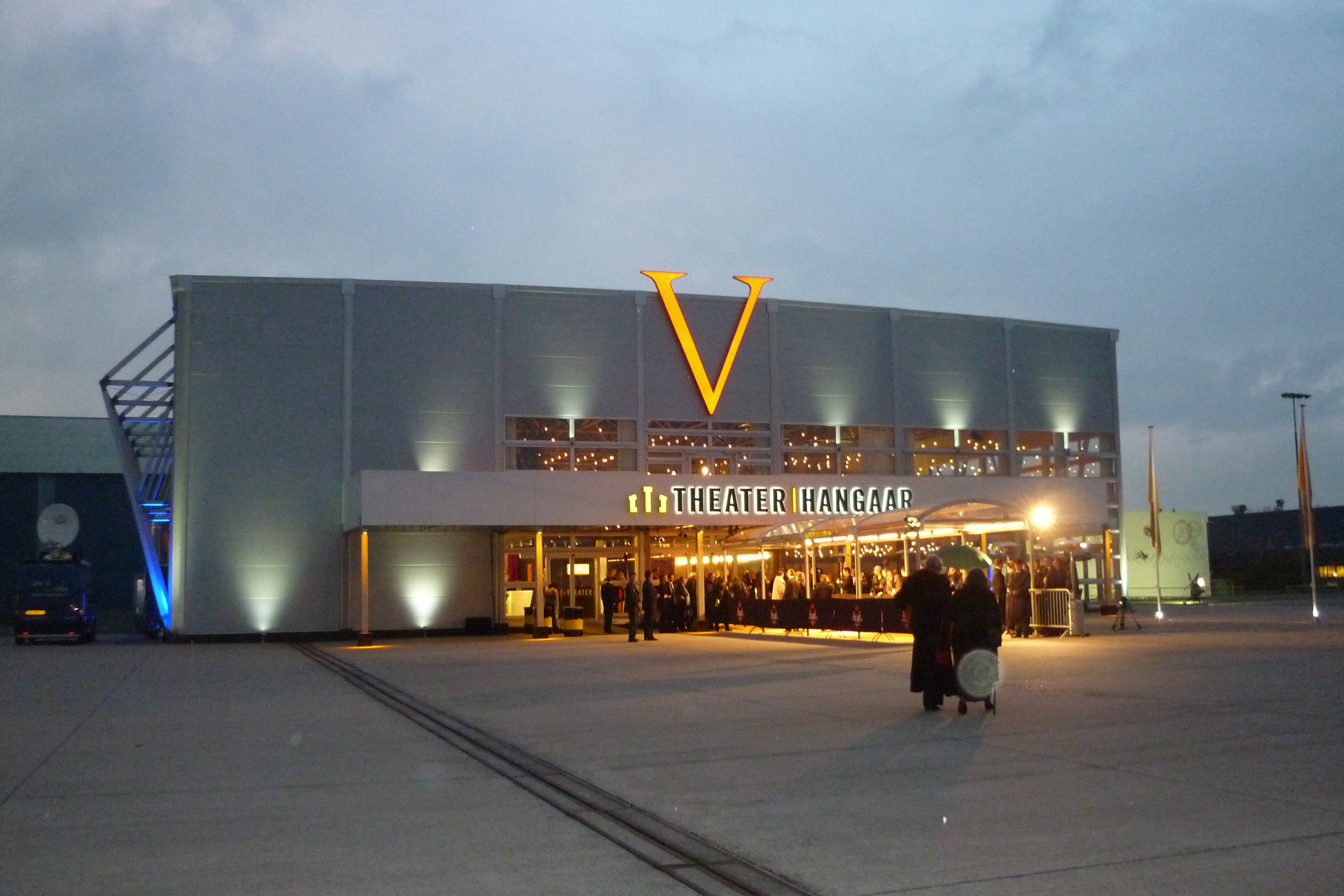
TheaterHangaar at the former airport Valkenburg, where the musical Soldier of Orange is performed

The system was developed and used for the Dutch musical production Soldier of Orange, which was produced by Robin de Levita and Fred Boot at TheaterHangaar.

De Levita invented SceneAround as a solution to play a large-scale production inside a former aeroplane hangar at the former Valkenburg military airport, between Wassenaar, Katwijk, and Leiden. The auditorium is surrounded by projection panels that can open to various widths of up to 180 degrees, framing each set.

== Auditorium ==
The auditorium at TheaterHangaar was designed by the Dutch architect Robert Nieuwenhuis. Within three months, a gigantic 1,100-seats steel turntable was created. The speed, direction, and movement of the turntable can all be adjusted or automated by its computerised control system, and the auditorium can spin on its axis up to seven times in either direction.

=== Facts ===
- Turntable diameter: 33 metres
- Speed: 1–2 metres per second at the outer edge of the turntable
- Weight: 300 tonnes (including the audience)
- Seats: 1,103
- Powered by 22 electric motors

== Set ==
Bernhard Hammer, an Austrian designer, created the set for the musical production at TheaterHangaar, directed by Theu Boermans. The sets are built around the auditorium, revealed and hidden by moving panels as needed. As the audience rotates to a new scene, the old set is hidden while the new one is revealed. This means that there is no need for breaks to change sets or the décor. By using theatrical masking techniques, such as projecting scene transitions or small scenes onto placed canvases, the set changes can be made nearly seamlessly without the audience noticing.

== Technique ==
The control of the turntable, rotation, and screens are automated and the timing can be synchronised with audio and visual cues.

== Company ==
Designers, engineers and companies that contributed to the initial production started the company SceneAround. The company’s aim is to create similar theatrical venues around the world.

== Other theatres ==
Theater Amsterdam, located on the south-west side of the Port of Amsterdam, is the world's first permanent theatre specifically designed to house a large-scale, fully rotating SceneAround auditorium. The theatre opened on 8 May 2014 with a performance of Anne, a play based on the diaries of Anne Frank.

In March 2017, the IHI Stage Around Tokyo opened as the first Asian theatre to use the SceneAround system, until its closure in 2024.

A new theatre, the Prinsentheater, was built in Delft in 2025–2026 and has been in operation since 8 February 2026, showing the Dutch production Willem van Oranje — de Musical (a musical based on the life of William of Orange).
