= Soldier of Orange (musical) =

Dutch musical

Soldaat van Oranje
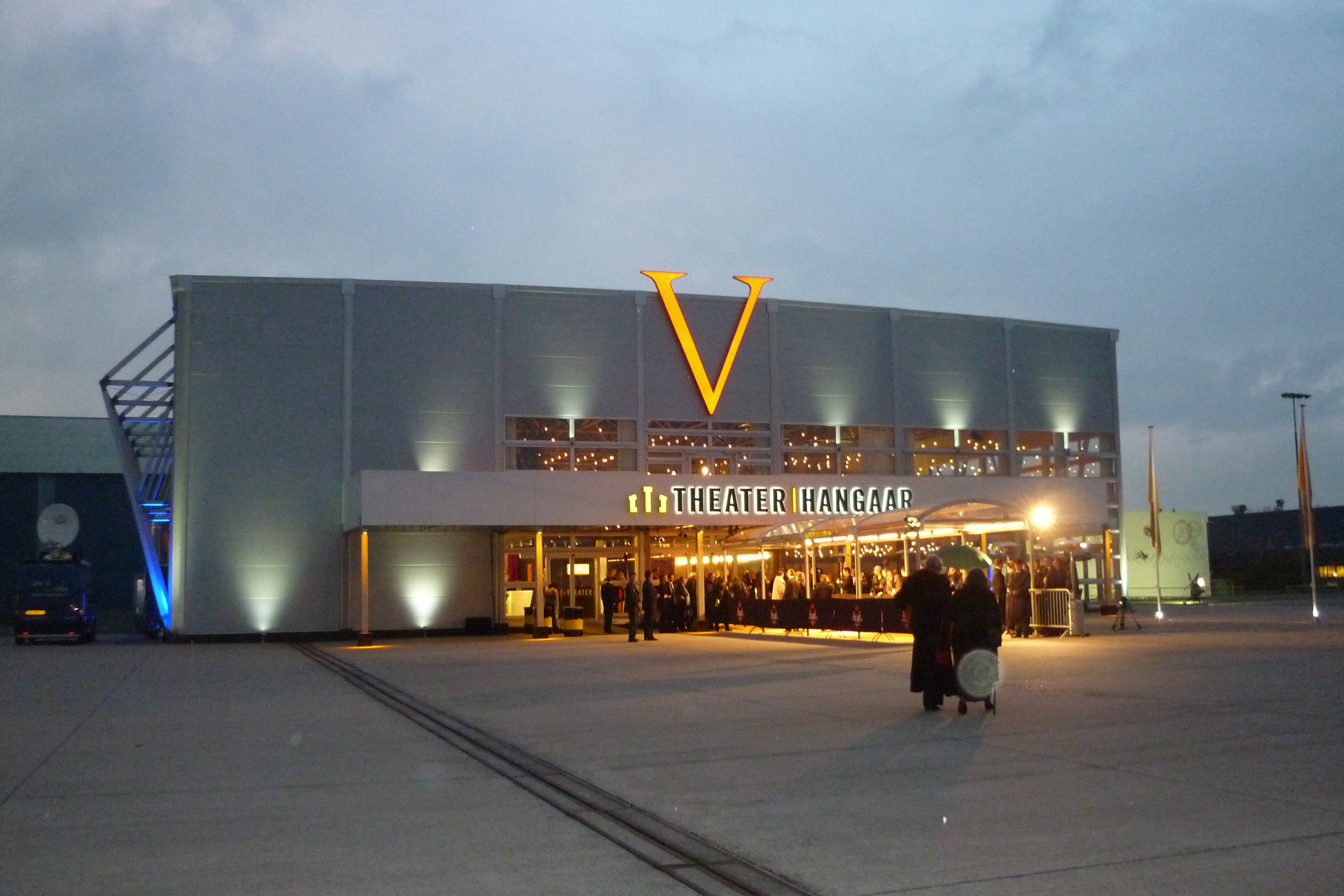
- TheaterHangaar at Valkenburg Naval Air Base
- Music: Tom Harriman
- Lyrics: Pamela Phillips Oland; Frans van Deursen; Erik van Muiswinkel
- Book: Pamela Philips Oland; Tom Harriman; Edwin de Vries
- Setting: The Netherlands and London during World War II
- Basis: Soldaat van Oranje by Erik Hazelhoff Roelfzema
- Premiere: October 30, 2010: TheaterHangaar Valkenburg
- Productions: 2010–2026 Valkenburg

Soldier of Orange (Dutch: Soldaat van Oranje) is a Dutch musical with lyrics by Pamela Phillips Oland, music by Tom Harriman, and book by Oland, Harriman and Edwin de Vries – who wrote the Dutch script; based on the true story of resistance hero Erik Hazelhoff Roelfzema. In the 1970s, he wrote his experiences during World War II down in a book and director Paul Verhoeven made it into a 1977 film, starring actor Rutger Hauer.

The musical premiered on 30 October 2010, in a theatre that was purpose-built for the production: the TheaterHangaar on the former Valkenburg air base in Katwijk (in an old hangar). Queen Beatrix attended the premiere together with Erik Hazelhoff Roelfzema's widow, Karin. Soldier of Orange is produced by NEW Productions, which is a subsidiary of investment company Amerborgh Nederland.

In the autumn of 2020, an English version of Soldier of Orange was set to premiere in a newly built Royal Docks Theatre near London City Airport but the plans were postponed in March 2020 when the COVID-19 pandemic started.

The original version of the show held its final performance on 14 July 2024. Several changes were made, including changes in the script and stage effects. Two new songs were added as well. The new version held try-outs from 3-7 September, and premiered on 11 September 2024.

On 26 January 2026, the producers announced that the production would close in July 2026, after almost 16 years and 3,967 performances. The final performance for regular audiences took place on 11 July, with a special private performance (for previous cast and crew members) on 12 July 2026.

== Plot ==
Student Erik Hazelhoff Roelfzema and his friends are carefree, until the Germans invade the Netherlands in the early days of May 1940. The war changes everything. They can no longer take friendship and love for granted. Everybody has to make choices. Fight for the country and for freedom? Focus on studying and deny what's going on? Or join the enemy?

The book of Hazelhoff Roelfzema, with the title Het hol van de ratelslang (English: Cave of the Rattlesnake), was published in 1970. It reappeared a year later under the title Soldaat van Oranje (English: Soldier of Orange). Paul Verhoeven created a film version in 1977. Rutger Hauer played the character Erik Lanshoff, based on the resistance hero.

Soldier of Orange – The Musical brings the true story to the theatre. After World War II starts, Erik decides to flee to Britain. He smuggles transmitting equipment to the Netherlands and, as a pilot, is involved in bombing Germany. He becomes adjutant for Queen Wilhelmina and receives the Military William Order ('Militaire Willems-Orde'), the highest royal honour in the Netherlands, for his contribution to the resistance movement.

== Background ==
Producer Fred Boot obtained the rights to turn the story into a musical in 2005, after meeting Hazelhoff Roelfzema the year before.

Scriptwriter Edwin de Vries wrote the musical script. American duo Tom Harriman and Pamela Philips Oland was responsible for composition and lyrics. Dutch actor and composer Frans van Deursen translated the lyrics from English into Dutch. In 2008, Boot asked theatre producer Robin de Levita to join him. Director Theu Boermans joined the team in 2009.

== Location ==
The show takes place in a former flight hangar, that is converted into a theatre. The location of the so-called TheaterHangaar is former military airport Valkenburg between Wassenaar, Katwijk and Leiden, a suitable, historical place. A foyer with a bar and restaurant is placed in front of the hangar.

== SceneAround ==
Producer Robin de Levita invented a new theatrical performance solution for Soldier of Orange – The Musical: a rotating auditorium in the center of a venue with 1100 seats. He named it SceneAround. The auditorium is placed on a turntable. The audience rotates from scenery to scenery, accompanied by 180 degree projections on panel screens around the auditorium. Both the auditorium and the screens are motorized and automated. The set is built around the auditorium. Almost every scenery has its own set. There is even a ‘sea’ and the outdoor runway of the airport is also part of the set.

== Dakota ==
Queen Wilhelmina returned to the Netherlands with a Dakota. The Dakota C-47 was made available for the musical by a Dutch museum and was taken to Valkenburg in August 2010. Shortly after midnight, the plane got stuck in an overpass. It was too damaged to have it repaired on time for the premiere. The Dakota PH-ALR ‘Reiger’ from 1939 that's being used in the production now, was delivered on 23 September 2010.

== Cast ==
The production had a total of 29 casts:

- Cast I: October 2010 – July 2011
- Cast II: August 2011 – February 2012
- Cast III: February – July 2012
- Cast IV: July 2012 – January 2013
- Cast V: February – July 2013
- Cast VI: August 2013 – January 2014
- Cast VII: January – July 2014
- Cast VIII: August 2014 – January 2015
- Cast IX: January – July 2015
- Cast X: July 2015 – January 2016
- Cast XI: February – July 2016
- Cast XII: August 2016 – January 2017
- Cast XIII: January – July 2017
- Cast XIV: August 2017 – January 2018
- Cast XV: February – July 2018
- Cast XVI: August 2018 – January 2019
- Cast XVII: January – July 2019
- Cast XVIII: August 2019 – January 2020
- Cast XIX: February – August 2020
- Cast XX: September 2020 – September 2021
- Cast XXI: October 2021 – July 2022
- Cast XXII: August 2022 – January 2023
- Cast XXIII: February – July 2023
- Cast XXIV: August 2023 – January 2024
- Cast XXV: February – July 2024
- Cast XXVI: September 2024 – January 2025
- Cast XXVII: February – July 2025
- Cast XXVIII: August 2025 – January 2026
- Cast XXIX: February – July 2026

A total of 18 actors have played more than one role, with Alex van Bergen being the only one to have played three different roles.

Role	Cast I	Cast II	Cast III	Cast IV	Cast V	Cast VI	Cast VII	Cast VIII	Cast IX	Cast X	Cast XI	Cast XII	Cast XIII	Cast XIV	Cast XV	Cast XVI	Cast XVII	Cast XVIII	Cast XIX	Cast XX	Cast XXI	Cast XXII	Cast XXIII	Cast XXIV	Cast XXV	Cast XXVI	Cast XXVII	Cast XXVIII	Cast XXIX
Erik Hazelhoff	Matteo van der Grijn, Dennis ten Vergert	Julian Looman	Dragan Bakema	Matteo van der Grijn, Robbert van den Bergh	Matteo van der Grijn, Robbert van den Bergh	Matteo van der Grijn, Jord Knotter	Matteo van der Grijn, Stefan Rokebrand	Stefan Rokebrand, Dorian Bindels	Dorian Bindels, Niels Gooijer	Dorian Bindels, Jonathan Demoor	Dorian Bindels, Thomas Cammaert	Valentijn Benard	Valentijn Benard, Jonathan Demoor	Sebas Berman, Theo Martijn Wever, Alex van Bergen	Theo Martijn Wever, Alex van Bergen	Alex van Bergen, Valentijn Benard	Alex van Bergen, Valentijn Benard	Alex van Bergen, Theo Martijn Wever	Alex van Bergen, Theo Martijn Wever	Alex van Bergen, Theo Martijn Wever	Alex van Bergen, Alexander Schuitema	Alex van Bergen, Alexander Schuitema, Jonathan Demoor	Alexander Schuitema, Milan Sekeris	Alexander Schuitema, Milan Sekeris	Jonathan Demoor, Dirk van den Brand	Joep Paddenburg, Stef van Gelder	Joep Paddenburg, Stef van Gelder	Joep Paddenburg, Samir Hassan	Buddy Vedder, Joep Paddenburg, Samir Hassan
Charlotte	Loes Haverkort, Marlijn Weerdenburg	Linde van den Heuvel	Linde van den Heuvel	Linde van den Heuvel	Linde van den Heuvel	Bente van den Brand	Loes Haverkort, Bente van den Brand	Loes Haverkort, Bente van den Brand	Merel Baldé, Lindertje Mans	Merel Baldé, Lindertje Mans	Merel Baldé, Bente van den Brand	Linde van den Heuvel, Melissa Drost	Linde van den Heuvel, Melissa Drost	Eva van der Post	Eva van der Post	Willemien Dijkstra	Willemien Dijkstra	Willemien Dijkstra	Willemien Dijkstra	Willemien Dijkstra	Cathalijne de Sonnaville	Cathalijne de Sonnaville	Diana van Die	Diana van Die	Diana van Die	Diana van Die	Danique Bol	Danique Bol	Joy Delima
Queen Wilhelmina	Catherine ten Bruggencate, Anke van 't Hof, Petra Laseur	Anne-Wil Blankers, Sylvia Poorta, Truus te Selle	Trudy de Jong, Marisa van Eyle, Myranda Jongeling	Catherine ten Bruggencate, Myranda Jongeling, Anne-Wil Blankers, Betty Schuurman	Catherine ten Bruggencate, Myranda Jongeling, Sylvia Poorta, Marisa van Eyle	Juul Vrijdag, Jacqueline Blom, Myranda Jongeling, Marisa van Eyle	Juul Vrijdag, Jacqueline Blom, Myranda Jongeling, Sylvia Poorta	Anne-Wil Blankers, Olga Zuiderhoek, Juul Vrijdag, Myranda Jongeling	Gusta Geleijnse, Myranda Jongeling	Juul Vrijdag, Olga Zuiderhoek, Gusta Geleijnse, Sylvia Poorta	Gusta Geleijnse, Henriëtte Tol, Myranda Jongeling, Juul Vrijdag	Henriëtte Tol, Myranda Jongeling, Sylvia Poorta	Juul Vrijdag, Debbie Korper	Henriëtte Tol, Myranda Jongeling	Debbie Korper, Wivineke van Groningen	Henriëtte Tol, Gusta Geleijnse	Henriëtte Tol, Wivineke van Groningen	Henriëtte Tol, Wivineke van Groningen, Debbie Korper	Debbie Korper, Barbara Pouwels	Debbie Korper, Barbara Pouwels	Sylvia Poorta, Barbara Pouwels, Henriette Tol	Sylvia Poorta, Barbara Pouwels, Henriette Tol	Sylvia Poorta, Barbara Pouwels, Henriette Tol	Debbie Korper, Barbara Pouwels	Debbie Korper, Barbara Pouwels	Henriëtte Tol, Sylvia Poorta	Sylvia Poorta, Ottolien Boeschoten	Henriëtte Tol, Ricky Koole	Henriëtte Tol, Lone van Roosendaal
Anton Roover	Oren Schrijver	Reinier Demeijer	Robbert van den Bergh, Oren Schrijver	Robbert van den Bergh, Thijs Steenkamp	Robbert van den Bergh, Thijs Steenkamp	Maarten Heijmans	Kevin Schoonderbeek	Thomas Cammaert	Ayal Oost	Thomas Cammaert, Ayal Oost	Jonathan Demoor	Roel Dirven	Roel Dirven	Lars Mak	Lars Mak	Lars Mak	Lars Mak	Thijs Miedema	Thijs Miedema	Thijs Miedema	Thijs Miedema	Bart van Veldhoven	Bart van Veldhoven	Bart van Veldhoven	Stefan de Kogel	Yoran de Bont	Yoran de Bont	Yoran de Bont	Milan van Waardenburg, Yoran de Bont, Bart van Veldhoven (one night only)
Chris de Vries	Boy Ooteman	Boy Ooteman	Thijs Steenkamp, Boy Ooteman	Thijs Steenkamp	Thijs Steenkamp, Xander van Vledder	Boy Ooteman	Boy Ooteman	Boy Ooteman	Zjon Smaal	Sjoerd Oomen	Dennis Willekens	Dennis Willekens	Marcel Harteveld	Marcel Harteveld	Marcel Harteveld	Ludo van der Winkel	Ludo van der Winkel	Ludo van der Winkel	Ludo van der Winkel	Jim Leijen	Jim Leijen	Jim Leijen	Jim Leijen	Jim Leijen	Jim Leijen	Rick van Stalle	Rick van Stalle	Rick van Stalle	Rick van Stalle
Fred van Houten	Tijn Docter	Xander van Vledder	Harpert Michielsen	Xander van Vledder	Kevin Schoonderbeek	Kevin Schoonderbeek	Anne Prakke	Anne Prakke, Kevin Schoonderbeek	Anne Prakke	Joost Claes	Kevin Schoonderbeek	Kevin Schoonderbeek	Kevin Schoonderbeek	Kevin Schoonderbeek	Kevin Schoonderbeek	Ruben Brinkman	Ruben Brinkman	Jelle de Jong	Jelle de Jong	Jelle de Jong	Beau Schneider	Folkert van Diggelen	Folkert van Diggelen	Alex van Bergen, Folkert van Diggelen	Alex van Bergen, Folkert van Diggelen	Ben Kütterer	Ben Kütterer	Ben Kütterer	Ben Kütterer
Bram Goudsmid	Jorrit Ruijs	Reinier Schimmel	Rutger Bulsing	Rutger Bulsing, Jorrit Ruijs	Jorrit Ruijs	Roel Dirven	Roel Dirven	Roel Dirven, Jorrit Ruijs	Roel Dirven	Sjoerd Spruijt	Sjoerd Spruijt	Sjoerd Spruijt	Sjoerd Spruijt	Matthijs Pater	Matthijs Pater	Matthijs Pater	Matthijs Pater	Eli ter Hart	Eli ter Hart	Eli ter Hart	Eli ter Hart	Eli ter Hart	Eli ter Hart	Eli ter Hart	Eli ter Hart	Eli ter Hart	Eli ter Hart	Diego González-Clark	Davy Reedijk
Paul ten Brink	Kes Blans	Kes Blans	Joey Schalker	Joey Schalker, Niels Gooijer	Rutger Bulsing	Daan Colijn	Daan Colijn	Daan Colijn	Alex van Bergen	Alex van Bergen	Tomer Pawlicki	Marijn Klaver	Marijn Klaver	Jasper van Hofwegen	Johnny Barendsen	Danny Westerweel	Danny Westerweel	Ruben Kuppens	Jochem Smit	Jochem Smit	Jochem Smit	Jochem Smit	Jochem Smit	Eli Rietveld	Hayo de Kruif	Hayo de Kruif	Hayo de Kruif	Korneel Defrancq	Korneel Defrancq
Victor Versteegen	Ad-Just Bouwman	Ad-Just Bouwman	Raymond Paardekooper	Raymond Paardekooper	Raymond Paardekooper	Noël S. Keulen	Noël S. Keulen	Noël S. Keulen	Guido de Wijs	Guido de Wijs	Johnny Barendsen	Johnny Barendsen	Valentijn van Hall	Valentijn van Hall	Valentijn van Hall	Johnny Barendsen	Johnny Barendsen	Johnny Barendsen	Johnny Barendsen	Johnny Barendsen	Johnny Barendsen	Johnny Barendsen	Johnny Barendsen	Ewout Heijbroek	Ewout Heijbroek	Korneel Defrancq	Korneel Defrancq	Roelof van der Sar	Yoshua van den Broek
Ada	Anne Lamsvelt	Christine de Boer	Christine de Boer, Anne Lamsvelt	Christine de Boer, Karolien Torensma	Karolien Torensma, Anne Lamsvelt	Sophie Schut	Sophie Schut	Sophie Schut	Sophie Höppener	Sophie Höppener	Mirtele Snabilie	Mirtele Snabilie	Lotta Sophie Bakker	Lotta Sophie Bakker	Margo Verhoeven	Marle Martens	Marle Martens	Lisse Knaappen	Lisse Knaappen	Lisse Knaappen	Julia Lammerts	Julia Lammerts	Julia Lammerts	Julia Lammerts	Dagmar Rijff	Dorien van Gent	Judith Boesen	Juliëtte van Leeuwen	Juliëtte van Leeuwen
François van 't Sant	Nico de Vries, Bart de Vries	Bart de Vries, Edwin de Vries	Bart de Vries, Nico de Vries	Bart de Vries	René van Zinnicq Bergmann, Nico de Vries	Nico de Vries, Maarten Wansink	René van Zinnicq Bergmann, Nico de Vries	Mark Rietman, Huub Stapel, Nico de Vries, Kees Hulst	Nico de Vries, Jaap Spijkers, Harpert Michielsen, Raymond Paardekooper	Hajo Bruins, Jaap Spijkers, Bert Geurkink	Peter Tuinman, Bert Geurkink, Raymond Paardekooper	Hajo Bruins, Raymond Paardekooper, Jaap Spijkers, Bert Geurkink	Raymond Paardekooper, Wil van der Meer, Howard van Dodemond	Raymond Paardekooper, Peter Tuinman	Raymond Paardekooper, Paul R. Kooij, Nico de Vries	Peter Tuinman, Raymond Paardekooper	Reinier Bulder, Peter Bolhuis	Raymond Paardekooper, Genio de Groot	Raymond Paardekooper, Genio de Groot	Raymond Paardekooper, Genio de Groot	Raymond Paardekooper, Peter Bolhuis	Raymond Paardekooper, Peter Bolhuis	Raymond Paardekooper, Genio de Groot	Tijn Docter, Raymond Paardekooper	Tijn Docter, Raymond Paardekooper	Tijn Docter, Sabri Saad El Hamus	Tijn Docter, Reinout Bussemaker	Tijn Docter, Reinout Bussemaker, Geert Lageveen	Aus Greidanus, Geert Lageveen, Tijn Docter (one night only), Reinout Bussemaker (one night only)
Lady Tessa	Margreet Boersbroek	Melissa Drost	Melissa Drost	Melissa Drost, Margreet Boersbroek	Jennifer van Brenk	Jennifer van Brenk	Jennifer van Brenk	Jennifer van Brenk	Jennifer van Brenk	Vérie Thijssen	Vérie Thijssen	Vérie Thijssen	Sandra Jonkman	Sandra Jonkman	Sandra Jonkman	Cathalijne de Sonnaville	Cathalijne de Sonnaville	Cathalijne de Sonnaville	Cathalijne de Sonnaville	Cathalijne de Sonnaville	Dominique de Bont	Dominique de Bont	Charlotte van der Plas	Charlotte van der Plas	Charlotte van der Plas	Charlotte Dommershausen	Charlotte Dommershausen	Emily White	Emily White
Lady Angela	—N/a	—N/a	—N/a	—N/a	—N/a	—N/a	—N/a	—N/a	—N/a	—N/a	—N/a	—N/a	—N/a	—N/a	—N/a	—N/a	—N/a	—N/a	—N/a	—N/a	—N/a	—N/a	—N/a	—N/a	—N/a	Emily White	Emily White	Merith van Mensch	Merith van Mensch
