= Anne (play) =

2014 play about Anne Frank

ANNE
- Written by: Anne Frank, Leon de Winter, Jessica Durlacher
- Characters: Anne Frank; Otto Frank; Edith Frank; Margot Frank; Hermann van Pels; Auguste van Pels; Chloe Day; Peter Schiff; Jan Gies; Miep Gies; and others
- Original language: Dutch
- Subject: The years Anne Frank spent in hiding from the German occupation of the Netherlands.
- Genre: Naturalistic / realistic biographical biography
- Setting: The secret annex behind Otto Frank's company in Amsterdam.

Premiere
- Date premiered: 8 May 2014
- Place premiered: Theater Amsterdam in Amsterdam, the Netherlands

ANNE is a 2014 play dramatising the story of Jewish diarist Anne Frank's period in hiding in the Secret Annex in Amsterdam during the Second World War. The play was the first major new adaptation of Frank's diary since the 1955 play, and was both authorised and initiated by the Anne Frank Foundation in Basel, the organisation set up by Frank's father Otto Frank to preserve his daughter's legacy and work. As such, Anne was the first adaptation allowed to quote literal passages from the diary. After a near two-year run in the Netherlands, the play closed in 2016, and had production runs in Germany and Israel. The play also formed the basis for the first German film adaptation of the diary.

== Synopsis ==
ANNE begins with a framing narrative set in Paris some years after the end of the Second World War. A girl in her early twenties, a student at a prestigious Parisian university, meets with friends and fellow students in a Paris restaurant. There, she runs into Dutch emigré Peter Schiff, who, like herself, has survived the war and has since established a publishing business in Paris. The girl reveals herself to be Anne Frank, a childhood friend of Schiff's from Amsterdam. She tells him her story, in chronological order, of the time between June 1942 and August 1944. Anne Frank subsequently frequently steps into and out of the narrative and back into the frame story to talk to Schiff, who remains part of the play as a confidante of Anne's.

The story jumps back in time to Anne Frank's thirteenth birthday in the Frank family home at Merwedeplein in Amsterdam. Anne is given a red and white checkered autograph book which she decides to use as a diary. A few weeks later, Anne's sister Margot Frank is summoned to report to a Nazi work camp in Germany, and their father, Otto Frank, decides to take the family into hiding in the annex at the back of his former company in central Amsterdam.

The family arrive in the annex, aided by Otto Frank's former colleagues and helpers Miep Gies and Jan Gies. A week later, they are joined by the Van Pels family: Otto's business partner Hermann, his wife Auguste and their teenage son Peter. Later that year, Jewish dentist Fritz Pfeffer also joins. Tensions between the two families begin to rise, and similarly between Anne and Pfeffer, with whom she is made to share a room. Anne finds solace in her diary, passages of which she reads out or relates to Schiff. Anne lives through puberty, her teenage years, conflicts with her family, and a burgeoning sexuality, but is forced to undergo it all in the cramped 500 square foot of the annex.

After nearly two years, the secret annex is discovered and the eight Jews in hiding are taken away by German soldiers and Dutch police. Otto Frank, the only inhabitant of the annex to survive the war, tells in a monologue of what happened to the two families and to Fritz Pfeffer after their arrest, their transit to camp Westerbork, and their deportation to Auschwitz, where the eight part ways. The play ends with a faint memory of Anne and Margot, slumped together in Bergen Belsen concentration camp where both would perish, surrounded by a crowd of anonymous concentration camp victims. Anne steps out of the tableau one final time, speaks a passage from her diary about her ambition to become an author, and disappears into a sunrise.

== Production ==
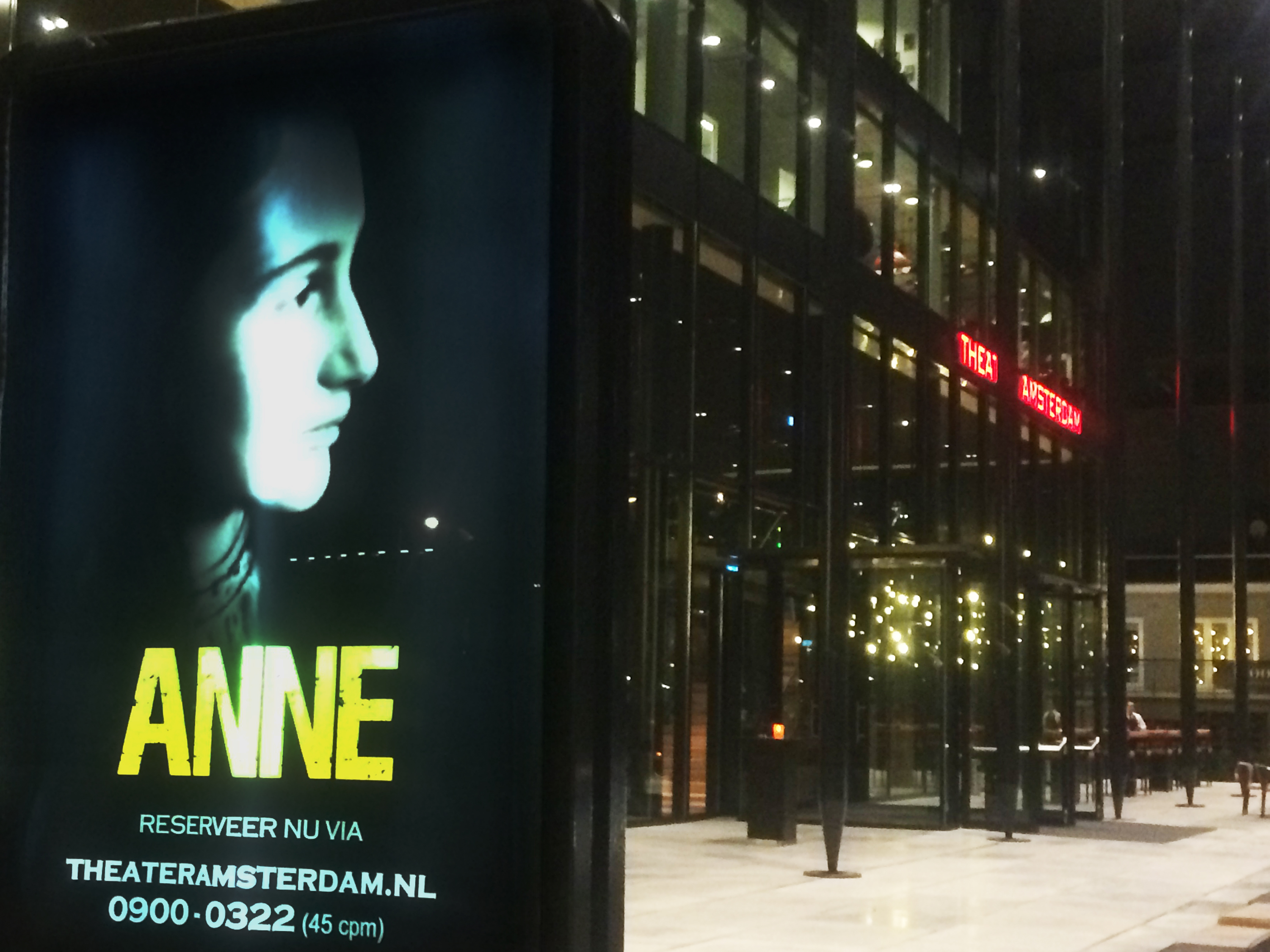
Theater Amsterdam, Amsterdam, the Netherlands. Exterior (front) of the building, with its logo visible on the right, and a poster for theatre production 'ANNE' on the left.

ANNE opened in Theater Amsterdam on May 8, 2014, in the presence of king Willem-Alexander of the Netherlands and Buddy Elias, at the time the last remaining family member of the Franks. The initiative for the production had come from the Anne Frank Foundation in Basel, set up by Otto Frank after the war to safeguard the legacy of Anne Frank and her writing, and to educate about the Holocaust. This meant that ANNE was the first adaptation of the diary to be allowed to quote direct passages, whereas earlier version had had to resort to rephrasing Frank's literal wording.

Purpose-built for ANNE by production company Imagine Nation, Theater Amsterdam is an 1100-seat theatre with a circular auditorium, allowing for quick scene changes through the use of a track system on which sets can be moved speedily into place by being driven around the audience seating banks. The theatre's architecture is modelled on a temporary theatre in Katwijk, home to Soldaat van Oranje, the longest-running musical in Dutch theatre history created by the same artistic team as ANNE.

The scale of the newly built venue allowed the producers, Tony-award winner Robin de Levita and former head of Sony Television Kees Abrahams, to recreate several sets in life size and with historical accuracy. Sets included the entire secret annex, Otto Frank's company's offices at Prinsengracht 263, as well as an apartment block from Amsterdam's Merwedeplein where the Frank family lived in the early years of the war. To ensure visibility to the audience, the annex part of the stage set was mounted on a revolve which could be raised and lowered as needed. During performance, images from the original hand-written diary, as well as historical film fragments and photos, were projected around the set. To allow for international visitors, a system of seatback-mounted iPads with real-time subtitles or audio dubbing in eight languages was installed.

To play Anne Frank, an extensive set of auditions was held, and the role was ultimately given to Rosa da Silva, a Dutch actress of half-Portuguese descent who, at the time, was in her final year at the Academy of Theatre and Dance in Amsterdam. Direction was by Theu Boermans - then artistic director of the national theatre of the Netherlands - with Teunkie Van Der Sluijs as resident director. Set design was by Austrian designer Bernhard Hammer. Rob Das reprised his role as helper Jan Gies from the Ben Kingsley-led ABC miniseries Anne Frank: The Whole Story. After the 2014 world premiere in Amsterdam, subsequent productions took place at the Ernst Deutsch Theater in Hamburg in 2015 and in Israel in 2016.

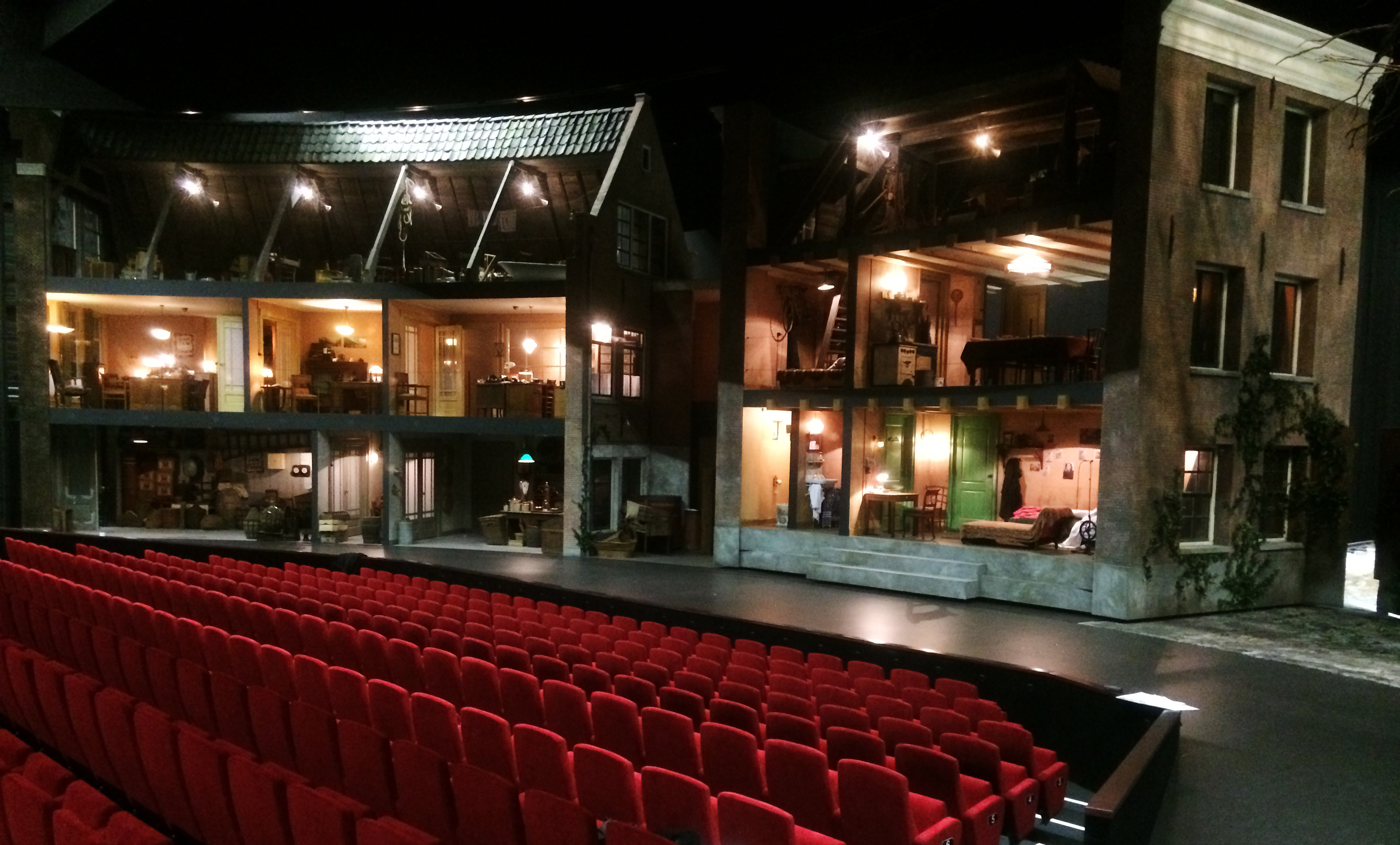
Stage set for the theatre production 'ANNE:' the re-created Opekta offices (left) and the Secret Annex (right) where Anne Frank and her family hid. The Annex part is constructed on a 360 degree revolving platform.

== Characters ==
Names of the world premiere cast are in brackets.

- Anne Frank (Rosa da Silva)
- Otto Frank (Paul R. Kooij)
- Edith Frank (Barbara Pouwels)
- Margot Frank (Chava voor in 't Holt)
- Hermann van Pels (Wim Bouwens)
- Auguste van Pels (Debbie Korper)
- Peter van Pels (Jason de Ridder)
- Fritz Pfeffer (Christo van Klaveren)
- Miep Gies (Eva Damen)
- Jan Gies (Rob Das)
- Peter Schiff (Daniel Cornelissen)
- Helmuth Silberberg (Job Bovelander)
- Hanneli Goslar (Sjoukje Hoogma)
- Jacqueline van Maarsen (Liliana de Vries)
- Esther (Margo de Geest)
- Bep Voskuijl (Marike Mingelen)
- Karl Silberbauer (Bas Heerkens)
- Wilhelm van Maaren (Martin van Tulder)
- Waiter (Wouter Zweers)
- Piene (Denise Rebergen)

== Critical reception ==
ANNE received critical acclaim from the international press, with major international news outlets ranging from The New York Times, CNN, Die Zeit, Haaretz, Le Monde and the Frankfurter Allgemeine Zeitung attending the world premiere in Amsterdam, the latter headlining "ANNE is a major event". The Times wrote: "The Dutch audience stood to applaud. Me, I was sobbing. Anger, pity, couldn’t help it."

In the Dutch press, responses were largely positive, ranging from five star reviews to critical commentary on the scale of the production. The production was selected for a special jury prize at the prestigious Nederlands Theater Festival in 2014, as well as the 2014 Nationale Innovatieprijs, the first time a theatre production won the award.
