= Fred Boot =

Dutch theatre producer

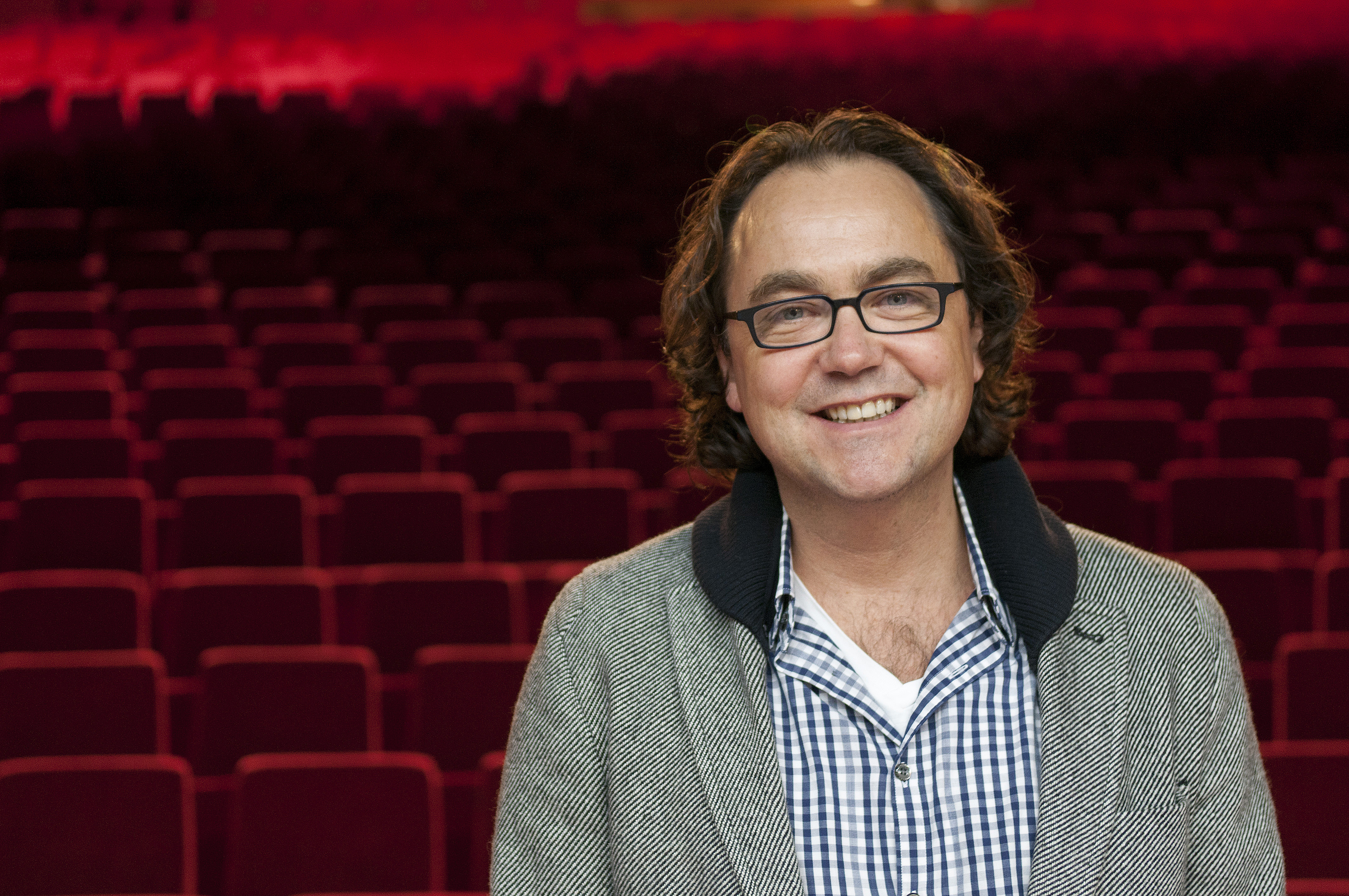
Fred Boot

Fred Boot (Groningen, 1965) is a Dutch theatre producer.

== Career ==
Boot started working for Joop van den Ende Theaterproducties in 1991 and was responsible for the publicity and marketing of over twenty musical productions, such as The Phantom of the Opera, Miss Saigon, Cyrano - The Musical, West Side Story, fifteen stage play's (amongst others Duet, The Sunshine Boys, Torch Song Trilogy) and several revues, cabaret shows and foreign productions.

He was also responsible for the corporate communication for Stage Entertainment and the publicity of foreign (co-)productions, such as The Phantom of the Opera, Cats and Les Misérables in Belgium, The Who's Tommy in London and Cyrano: The Musical, Victor/Victoria, Titanic and Footloose in New York. He often collaborated with theatre- and television producer Robin de Levita.

In 1999, Boot established an artist agency, Montecatini Talent Agency. While working there, he was involved in the production of the shows Love me just a little bit more, Rocky over the rainbow, La Vie Parisienne and A Tribute to the Blues Brothers. Together with Stichting De Praktijk he produced the play Hurly Burly.

In 2005 he obtained the rights to turn the story of Dutch resistance hero Erik Hazelhoff Roelfzema into a musical production. Soldier of Orange premiered in the Netherlands on October 30, 2010.

Boot is managing director of NEW Productions, a company he established with his partners in Montecatini Talent Agency and Amerborgh Nederland. NEW Productions produced Soldier of Orange – The Musical and, in 2011, the theatre show Het Mooiste van Sesamstraat, based on the successful children's television show Sesame Street.
