= François van 't Sant =

Dutch police commissioner and spy (1883–1966)

François van 't Sant CBE
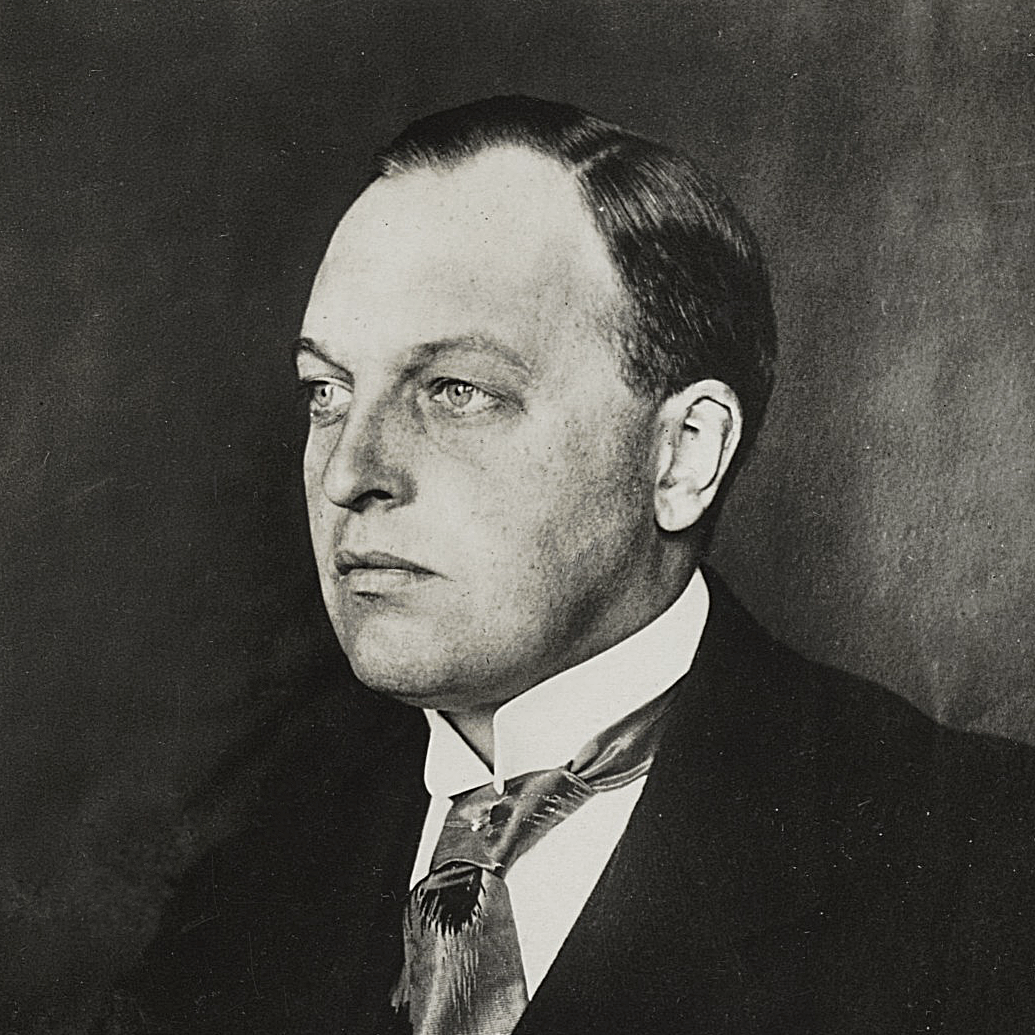
- Born: 1883; Den Helder, Netherlands
- Died: 3 June 1966 (aged 82–83); Rotterdam, Netherlands
- Awards: Grand Officer in the Order of the House of Orange; Knight in the Order of the Netherlands Lion; Officer in the Order of Orange-Nassau; Commander of the Most Excellent Order of the British Empire; Officer in the National Order of the Legion of Honour (France); Commander in the Order of the Crown of Italy; Commander in the Order of the Phoenix (Greece); Officer in the Order of Christ (Portugal); Knight in the Order of the Polar Star (Sweden); Officer in the Royal Order of Vasa (Sweden); Officer in the Order of the Crown of Belgium
- Espionage activity
- Allegiance: Netherlands
- Rank: Head-commissioner of police Major-general
- Operations: World War I and World War II

François van 't Sant CBE (1883 – 3 June 1966) was a Dutch head-commissioner of police, leading intelligence figure and confidant of Queen Wilhelmina and other members of the Dutch Royal House of Orange-Nassau. In both World War I and World War II he played a key role in combined Dutch–British intelligence operations.

== Early career ==
He was born in 1883 in the naval town of Den Helder as the eighth child of Laurens van 't Sant and Néline François. His father was a minister in the Calvinist Dutch Reformed Church. His youth was mostly spent in the city of Utrecht. In 1906 he became a clerk within the Rotterdam Municipal Police Corps, a starters function for future police officers. He impressed his superiors so much that after an unusual short period of six months he was promoted inspector trainee. He served in Rotterdam's roughest neighbourhood, Rodezand, where sailors from all over the world would meet prostitutes. In 1910 he was promoted to inspector 3rd class and head of the River Police unit. On 27 August 1914 he married the Swedish soprano Kerstin (Greta) Margaretha Jonsson, after he had met her at a Wagner performance in Rotterdam during an international tour. In June 1915 the couple had a daughter.

== World War I ==
At the beginning of World War I, Van 't Sant was tasked with controlling foreign secret agents operating in Rotterdam. He also became an officer in the Dutch military intelligence and security service GSIII. Because of its location and Dutch neutrality the international port city become the war's largest spy centre. At an early stage, Van 't Sant met Richard Tinsley, a maritime agent turned station chief of the British secret service now known as the Secret Intelligence Service or MI6. Between him and Tinsley, a co-operation developed where the Rotterdam police would tolerate British intelligence operations directed against Germany in return for sharing the gathered intelligence. Van 't Sant attempted to establish a similar arrangement with the German secret services operating in Rotterdam, but no arrangement could be reached as the German services did not trust him.

Thanks to his ability to control foreign secret services and his dealings with Tinsley, at the age of 33 Inspector Van 't Sant was promoted to head-commissioner (Chief of Police) of the city of Utrecht in November 1916. In 1918, the Germans approached him to establish contacts with the British government to begin the peace negotiations which brought the war to an end. Van 't Sant was awarded Commander of the Most Excellent Order of the British Empire by King George V in January 1920, a rare honour for non-British citizens.

== Prince Henry ==
In October 1920, Van 't Sant became head-commissioner of The Hague, a more prestigious post than Utrecht, as it involved regular contacts with the Royal House and key government figures. Queen Wilhelmina employed Van 't Sant as her odd-job man. One of his main tasks would be to keep Prince-consort Henry, Duke of Mecklenburg-Schwerin, out of trouble. Next to his only legitimate daughter Princess Juliana of the Netherlands, the future queen, Prince Henry had fathered several illegitimate children for which Van 't Sant had to make regular payments. Henry's philandering life style also involved regular visits to prostitutes. With knowledge of the queen, Van 't Sant invited prostitutes to his private home in The Hague in order to better control them and assess their health, before Prince Henry would enter through the back door and spend some time with them in Van 't Sant's guest room.

In the 1930s, Van 't Sant was entangled in the Elisabeth le Roi affair. This affair was centred around a possible mistress of Prince Henry named Elisabeth le Roi, very likely a pseudonym. Van 't Sant pretended that her illegitimate child was fathered by the recently deceased Jonkheer Carel van Vredenburch, a former high ranking, rich and upper-class Dutch diplomat. Van 't Sant convinced Vredenburch's heirs that the child was Vredenburch's and in order to avoid public embarrassment he had to pay the woman hush money and make her and her child disappear. But soon Vredenburch's family started to suspect Van 't Sant was swindling them as part of an ordinary blackmail scheme. An unofficial investigation and informal tribunal by three selected members of the ruling class followed. The tribunal acquitted Van 't Sant, but did reproach him for unprofessional behaviour. In January 1935, he resigned voluntarily as head-commissioner of police.

Queen Wilhelmina intermittently employed Van 't Sant as her private secretary. When the story of the secret tribunal broke via the National Socialist newspaper Volk en Vaderland, public outcry forced the authorities to an official criminal investigation. It lasted until 1938 when Van 't Sant was again acquitted, due to lack of evidence. In 1956, Van 't Sant admitted in an interview with historian Loe de Jong that he had scammed the Vredenburch family and had made up the story in order to spare the Royals another scandal. Still, some people did not accept his explanation. The Dutch writer and journalist A. den Doolaard would remain his adversary, publishing in as late as 1980 a pamphlet against Van 't Sant.

== World War II ==
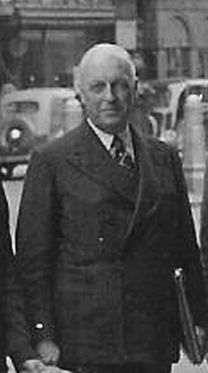
François van 't Sant on Pall Mall near St. James's Palace, London, 1946.

When the Germans invaded the Netherlands on Friday 10 May 1940 the Queen and the Royal Family were in danger of capture by the Nazis. On Sunday 12 May the Queen, accompanied by Van 't Sant, travelled to Hook of Holland and at 23.00 in the evening left the Netherlands on board of the British destroyer HMS Codrington. Van 't Sant had to leave his wife and daughter behind. His house in The Hague was confiscated by the Sicherheitsdienst (SD), the security service of the SS, who used it as an office and its cellar as a torture chamber. In the exiled government based in London, Van 't Sant served as the private secretary of the queen and was the head of the Centrale Inlichtingendienst (Dutch Central Intelligence Service) (CID) with the rank of major-general. The CID was an intelligence service for gathering information, supporting the resistance and committing sabotage in the German-occupied Netherlands.

Van 't Sant and the CID cooperated closely with the foreign intelligence division of MI6, known as British Military Intelligence Section 9. Young volunteers were sent as secret agents into the Netherlands. They were trained by MI6, before being dropped by air or boat in the Netherlands. Due to bad training, insufficient preparation and betrayal many of these were arrested and executed by the Germans. Van 't Sant was not involved with the sending of Dutch agents into Holland by the SOE, which was being double played by the SD and Abwehr in the so-called Englandspiel.

Given his aggregation of several functions, some people felt Van 't Sant was getting too powerful. In August 1941 he was forced to resign as head of the CID, though he remained active as an advisor to the Queen and director of Police. Many who escaped from the Netherlands were interrogated by him to establish their trustworthiness, out of fear of German infiltrators. Amongst these refugees were resistance heroes such as Erik Hazelhoff Roelfzema and Peter Tazelaar. Many influential exiles, as well as resistance figures in the Netherlands, conspired against Van 't Sant as they did not trust him and considered him a Rasputin figure. Unjustified rumours had it he was a German spy. In 1944 the queen fired him as her private secretary under pressure of prime minister Gerbrandy who was backed by Winston Churchill.

After the Netherlands was liberated Van 't Sant was re-united with his wife. They lived together in Torquay, England, until her death in June 1950 from a stroke.

== Later years ==
In 1952 Van 't Sant returned to the Netherlands to live in Rotterdam, to be closer to his daughter. Once back, he soon became a confidant again of the Royal Family. As such he got involved in the so-called 'Greet Hofmans Affair'. Greet Hofmans was a female faith healer, hand layer and pacifist, who gained a lot of influence on Queen Juliana. Although Prince-consort Bernhard, Prince of Lippe-Biesterfeld, had introduced Hofmans in 1948 to the queen in order to cure their youngest daughter, Princess Christina, he soon distrusted her and tried to send her away. When this failed he leaked to the German magazine Der Spiegel, who published an article on 13 June 1956 which brought the affair in the open. It resulted in a pitched battle between the Queen and her husband, who was supported by his oldest daughter, the future Queen Beatrix. The affair led to a severe crisis in the Royal marriage. A commission was created to investigate the affair and Van 't Sant acted as an important witness, as he was trusted by both parties. In the end the queen was forced to expel Hofmans from her court.

In the morning of 3 June 1966 François van 't Sant died in his sleep at the age of 83 in Rotterdam.

== Portrayal in popular culture ==
In 1977 Dutch film director Paul Verhoeven directed Soldaat van Oranje which was internationally distributed as Soldier of Orange. The film is loosely based on the memoirs of Erik Hazelhoff Roelfzema (see above), who is portrayed by Rutger Hauer. Van 't Sant appears as 'Van der Zanden'. His person also plays a major role in the television series Wilhelmina (NCRV, 2001). A Van 't Sant character appeared in the musical version of Soldaat van Oranje, which premièred in the Netherlands in 2010. The production was very successful, and toured the world in 2014.

== Bibliography ==
- Arlman, Hugo; Mulder, Gerard (1983). Van de prins geen kwaad [From the prince do not know evil] (in Dutch). Amsterdam: Sijthoff.
- Doolaard, A. den (1980). Londen en de zaak Van 't Sant [London and the Van 't Sant' case] (in Dutch). Amsterdam: Querido.
- Jong, Loe de (1969–1994). Het Koninkrijk der Nederlanden in de Tweede Wereldoorlog [The Kingdom of the Netherlands in World War II] (in Dutch). The Hague: SDU.
- Ruis, Edwin (2016). Spynest. British and German Espionage from Neutral Holland 1914–1918. Briscombe: The History Press.
- Zee, Sytze van der (2015). Harer Majesteits loyaalste onderdaan. François van 't Sant 1883–1966 [Her Majesty's loyal subject: François van 't Sant 1883–1966] (in Dutch). Amsterdam: De Bezige Bij. ISBN 978-90-234-9685-4.
