= Soldier of Orange =

1977 Dutch film by Paul Verhoeven

- American film poster
- Directed by: Paul Verhoeven
- Written by: Kees Holierhoek; Gerard Soeteman; Paul Verhoeven
- Based on: Soldaat van Oranje by Erik Hazelhoff Roelfzema
- Produced by: Rob Houwer
- Starring: Rutger Hauer; Jeroen Krabbé; Derek de Lint; Edward Fox
- Cinematography: Jost Vacano
- Edited by: Jane Sperr
- Music by: Rogier van Otterloo
- Production companies: Excelsior Films; The Rank Organisation; Film Holland; Rob Houwer Productions
- Distributed by: Tuschinski Film Distribution
- Release date: 22 September 1977
- Running time: 147 minutes
- Country: Netherlands
- Languages: Dutch; English; German
- Budget: ƒ 5 million

Soldier of Orange (Dutch: Soldaat van Oranje, IPA: [sɔlˈdaːt fɑn oːˈrɑɲə]), released in the United Kingdom as Survival Run, is a 1977 Dutch romantic war thriller film directed and co-written by Paul Verhoeven and produced by Rob Houwer, based on Erik Hazelhoff Roelfzema's autobiographical book of the same name. Starring Rutger Hauer and Jeroen Krabbé, the film is set around the German occupation of the Netherlands during World War II, and shows how individual students have different roles in the war.

With a budget of ƒ 5 million (€2.3 million), it was, at the time, the most expensive Dutch film ever. With 1,547,183 viewers, Soldier of Orange was the most popular Dutch film of 1977. The film received a Golden Globe nomination for Best Foreign Language Film in 1980. At the 1999 Netherlands Film Festival, it was voted the second-best Dutch film of the twentieth century.

In 1979, the film was edited into a miniseries and aired on TV as Voor Koningin en Vaderland.

== Plot ==
During World War II, a group of students in Leiden, the Netherlands—Erik Lanshof, Guus LeJeune, Jan Weinberg, Alex, Erik's friend Robby Froost and his girlfriend Esther—collaborate, while others join the Dutch resistance.

A newsreel plays from the immediate postwar period of Queen Wilhelmina returning to the Netherlands. In 1938 Leiden, freshmen undergo the initiation rites of their fraternity. Erik is singled out by Guus, the chair, who drops a bowl of soup on his head, injuring him. Guus apologises and offers a room in his student house. There, the students (Erik, Guus, Jacques, Jan, and Alex) drink to their friendship.

In September 1939, an English radio broadcast interrupts their tennis, announcing the declaration of war against Germany. Initially, they are unalarmed, believing the Netherlands will remain neutral as in World War I. Jan, a Jew, and Alex, who is half German, join the Dutch Army. In May 1940, Germany invades. Erik and Guus try to join up, but are fobbed off. Soon, the Netherlands capitulates after the Rotterdam Blitz.

Robby is in contact with the Dutch government-in-exile via a radio transmitter in his garden and offers Erik a flight to London. Jan, a boxing champion, assaults two fascists harassing a Jewish hawker, so Erik offers his seat to Jan. However, the Germans intercept the pick up: Jan is captured but Erik escapes.

Erik sees Alex marching in a departing military parade of the Waffen-SS. Later, Erik is also captured. Jan tells him, based on his interrogator's comment, that a Van der Zanden in London betrayed them. Jan, who resists interrogation, is executed on the Waalsdorpervlakte dunes. Robby's radio is discovered, and he is forced to work for the Gestapo by their threat of deporting Esther, a Jew, to a labour camp.

Erik and Guus flee for London on the Swiss cargo ship St. Cergue. In London, Erik meets Van der Zanden (modelled after general François van 't Sant) and tries to kill him. However he is not a traitor, but head of the Dutch Central Intelligence Service and a private secretary to Queen Wilhelmina. Guus begins an affair with Susan, a secretary in British intelligence. Erik and Guus agree to rescue resistance leaders for post-war roles. Guus is taken ashore and meets the leaders. As Guus' radio has been damaged by seawater, they use Robby to contact London.

Erik then follows to arrange Guus and the resistance leaders' departure by sea. However, Robby has infiltrated the group and so the Germans have followed them. Erik sees Robby with them and tries unsuccessfully to warn them. After ducking into the beach mansion party for cover, seeing Alex and dancing ballroom tango with him, Erik meets the others on the beach. When Robby realises Erik knows about his collaboration, he fires a signal flare. Despite German warnings, the group tries to escape but the leaders are killed. Guus escapes by swimming, but only Erik reaches the ship.

Guus shoots Robby in the street before fleeing but he is caught and guillotined. On the Eastern Front, Alex is killed in a latrine by a hand grenade from a boy he had mocked when the boy begged for food. Erik becomes an RAF bomber pilot and is later appointed aide to Queen Wilhelmina, and accompanies her home. Erik finds that Dutch citizens have cut off Esther's hair as punishment for her and Robby's collaboration. She says she bears no grudge. Finally, Erik celebrates the end of the war with fellow student Jacques ten Brinck, who also survived.

== Cast ==
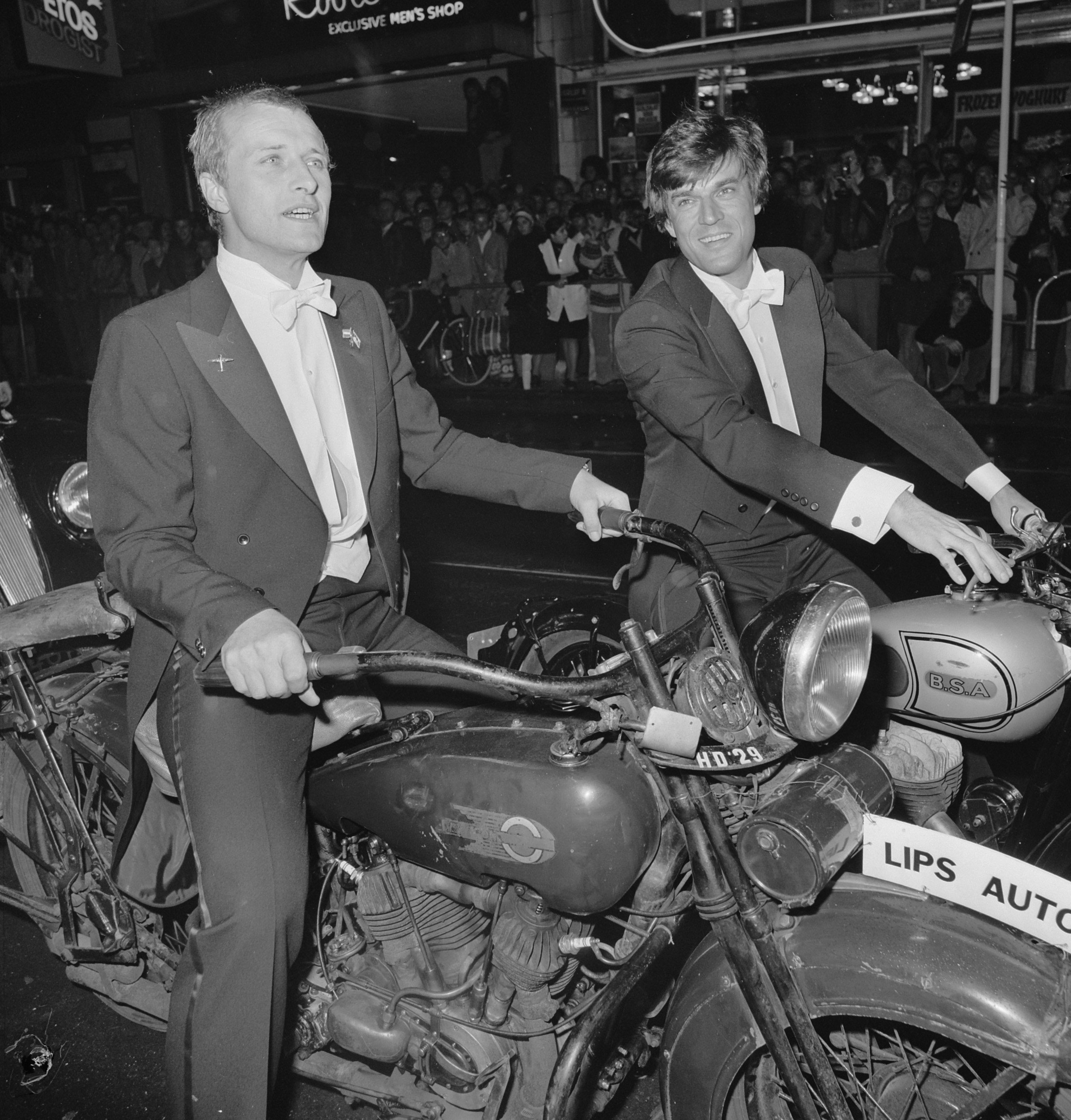
Rutger Hauer and Jeroen Krabbé arrive at the film's premiere

- Rutger Hauer as Erik Lanshof, a student in Leiden who joins the resistance.
- Jeroen Krabbé as Guus LeJeune, a combination of Ernst de Jonge, Peter Tazelaar and Chris Krediet, a student and friend of Erik who also joins the resistance.
- Susan Penhaligon as Susan, a British soldier and secretary to Colonel Rafelli.
- Edward Fox as Colonel Rafelli, the British officer who runs the missions Erik and Guus undertake to the occupied Netherlands.
- Lex van Delden as Nico, another of the students.
- Derek de Lint as Alex, a half-German student who is at first drafted into the Dutch army before joining the Waffen-SS after the German victory.
- Huib Rooymans as Jan Weinberg, a Jewish student and boxing champion.
- Dolf de Vries as Jacques ten Brinck, a student friend of Erik who continues his studies at Leiden University.
- Eddy Habbema as Robby Froost, a friend of Erik who operates radio communications for the resistance.
- Belinda Meuldijk as Esther, Bobby's fiancée who assists Erik on several occasions.
- Peter Faber as Will Oostgaarde, who accompanies Erik and Guus to London.
- Rijk de Gooyer as Gestapo-man Breitner.
- Reinhard Kolldehoff as Sturmbannführer Geisman, the German senior officer who gives orders to Breitner.
- Andrea Domburg as Wilhelmina, Queen of the Netherlands.
- Guus Hermus as Van der Zanden, head of the Dutch Central Security Service and trustee of Queen Wilhelmina in London.
- Bert André as local man Gekke Dirk.
- Hugo Koolschijn as a Sicherheitspolizei-Leutnant.
- Brûni Heinke as an NSB member.

== Reception ==
=== Critical response ===
Soldier of Orange has an approval rating of 91% on review aggregator website Rotten Tomatoes, based on 11 reviews, and an average rating of 7.8/10.

=== Accolades ===
The film won the Los Angeles Film Critics Association Award for Best Foreign Film in 1979. One year later, in 1980, it received a Golden Globe nomination for Best Foreign Language Film, but the French-Italian film La Cage aux Folles won the award.

In the vote for best Dutch film of the twentieth century at the Netherlands Film Festival in 1999 Soldier of Orange won second place behind Turkish Delight, another Paul Verhoeven film.

The film was selected as the Dutch entry for the Best Foreign Language Film at the 50th Academy Awards, but was not accepted as a nominee.

Festival	Year	Nominated work	Category	Result
Los Angeles Film Critics Association	1979	Soldier of Orange	Award for Best Foreign Film	Won
Golden Globe Awards	1980	Soldier of Orange	Best Foreign Language Film	Nominated

== Stage adaptation ==
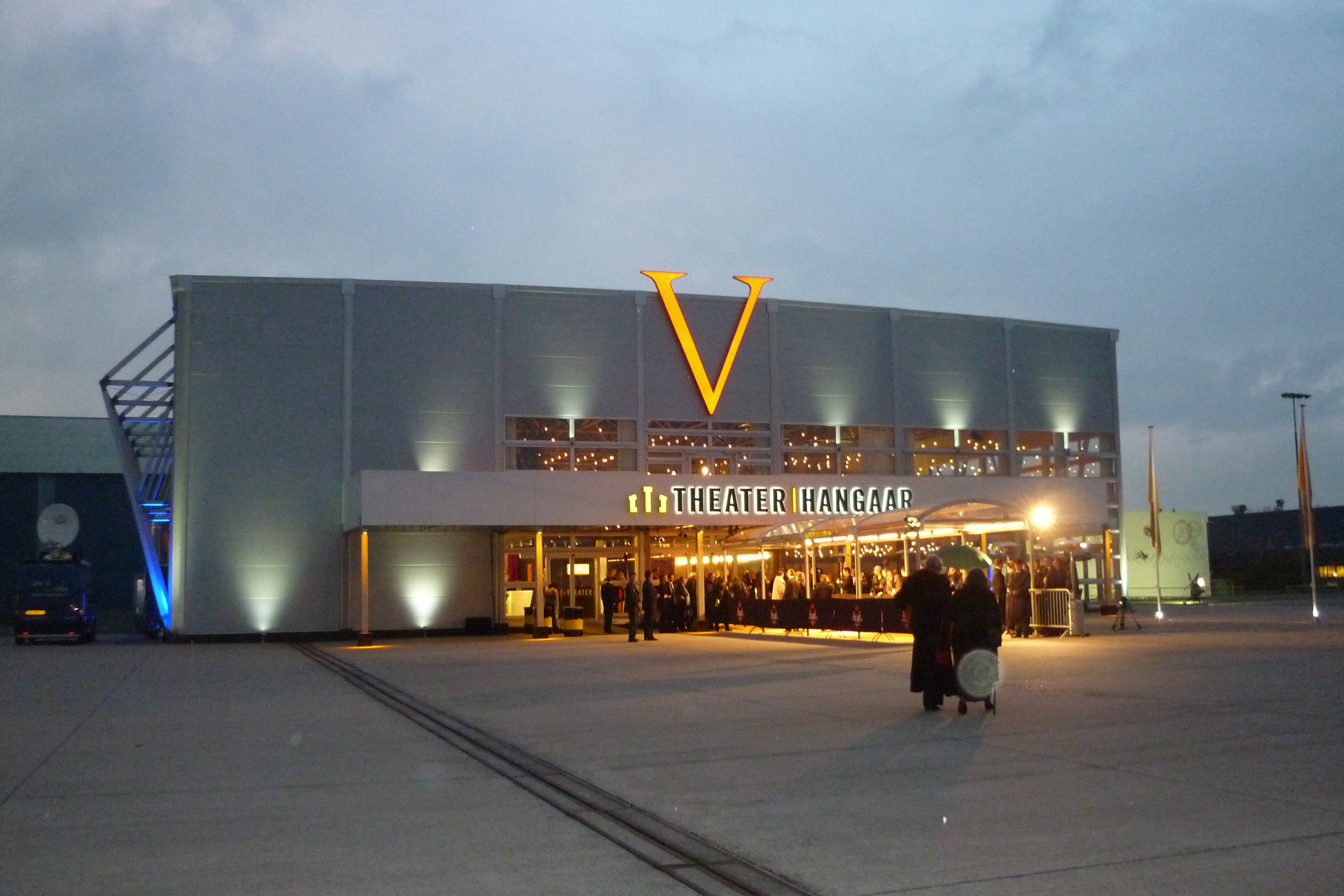
Theatre Hangar Valkenburg

On 30 October 2010, a musical of the same name premiered in the Netherlands. It was shown in a special theatre converted from an old hangar at the former Valkenburg Air Base in Katwijk. Instead of having the sets changing onstage, the area where the audience sits revolved to different stages (using a system named SceneAround), which included a set with a recreated beach and an artificial sea and a set containing a real Douglas DC-3 Dakota plane.

The musical has since been performed in other cities, but the planned London events were initially postponed due to the Covid-19 pandemic and never took place as the proposed Royal Docks Theatre was never built.

In July 2024, the show went into a two-month hiatus, for the show was to be modified. Changes were made to some characters, lines and songs. The new version premiered in September 2024.

The show is set to have its final performance on 12 July 2026.

== See also ==
- List of submissions to the 50th Academy Awards for Best Foreign Language Film
- List of Dutch submissions for the Academy Award for Best Foreign Language Film
