= Robin de Levita =

Dutch theatre- and television producer (born 1959)

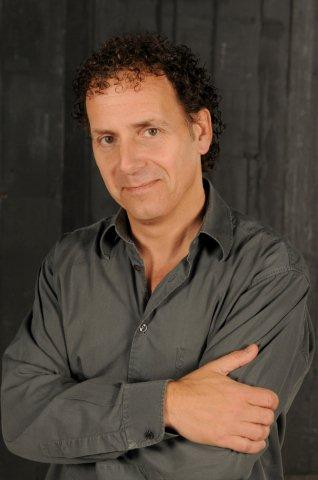
Robin de Levita

Robin de Levita (born April 19, 1959) is a Dutch theatre- and television producer, who produced shows on Broadway and West End and won several Tony Awards.

== Career ==
De Levita produced over a hundred television programs for Dutch media tycoon Joop van den Ende TV-Producties/ Endemol. After that, he started to work internationally. From 1993 - 2001 he lived and worked in New York City, first as managing director of Endemol Theater Productions. His first Broadway production was the musical Cyrano, followed by Victor/Victoria with Julie Andrews.

For five years, De Levita was a partner in Dodger Theatricals and produced Hamlet (with Ralph Fiennes), 42nd Street, Urinetown and Into the Woods among seventeen Broadway shows.

In London, he produced The Who's Tommy, Chicago, West Side Story and The Full Monty. In Europe he oversaw numerous shows for Stage Entertainment, such as The Phantom of the Opera, Miss Saigon, Les Misérables, The Lion King, Cats, Titanic and Cabaret.

De Levita was a member of the Board of Stage Entertainment from 2000 till the end of 2005. In 2005 he started his own production company: Robin de Levita Productions. He developed two musicals with writer/choreographer Sarah Miles and composer/lyricist/record producer John Ewbank: Carmen and Mad Alice.

In February 2011 it was announced that Robin de Levita Productions signed a joint venture with Icelandic producer Vesturport to bring international productions to Broadway, West End and other major markets. The first collaboration between the two was Metamorphosis in the Brooklyn Academy of Music (BAM).

Together with New Productions De Levita is the producer of the musical Soldaat van Oranje (Soldier of Orange), based on the story of a Dutch resistance hero. De Levita invented a new theatrical performance solution for this production: a rotating auditorium in the center of a venue with 1100 seats. He named it SceneAround. Soldier of Orange is the longest running musical in the Netherlands.

De Levita is co-founder and -owner of the international production company Imagine Nation.

In 2014 he produced the critically acclaimed Anne a new contemporary play, based on The Diary of Anne Frank. It's the first official stage adaptation since a Broadway production in 1950’s and for the first time in history based on the original writings of Anne Frank. The play was being performed at Theater Amsterdam, a brand new venue, the first in the world, specially built (by Imagine Nation) to host a single play. Designed and constructed in record time. New York Times: “…Mr. de Levita built the new Theater Amsterdam in eight months.” ANNE is the longest running theatrical performance in the Netherlands.

In 2016 he co-produced the 3D-musical SKY with, amongst others, Dutch singer Marco Borsato in Theater Amsterdam.

De Levita has worked with many high-profile celebrities including: Ralph Fiennes, Julie Andrews, Raquel Welch, Tina Turner, Liza Minnelli, David Bowie and more.

Upcoming shows: Robin de Levita will lead as a producer The Hunger Games stage version production, the Lionsgate hit based on Suzanne Collins’s best-selling trilogy. The play will launch in the summer of 2016. A special theater is being constructed next to Wembley Stadium in London, specifically to present the stage version of the property.

== Productions ==
Broadway

- Cyrano - The Musical
- Victor/Victoria
- Hamlet
- High Society
- Wrong Mountain
- Blast!
- 1776
- A Funny Thing Happened on the Way to the Forum
- The King and I
- Titanic
- Footloose
- The Music Man
- 42nd Street
- Urinetown
- Into the Woods
- Dracula
- Good Vibrations

Off Broadway

- Savion Glover Downtown
- Minor Demons

The West End

- The Who’s Tommy
- Contact
- Chicago
- West Side Story
- The Full Monty

Germany

- Elisabeth
- The Lion King
- Cats
- The Phantom of the Opera
- Titanic
- AIDA
- Les Misérables
- 42nd Street
- Dance of the Vampire
- Blue Man Group

Spain

- Cabaret
- Cats
- Mamma Mia!

The Netherlands

- Barnum
- Sweet Charity
- Cabaret
- Funny Girl
- Sweeney Todd
- My Fair Lady
- Evita
- West Side Story
- Cats (Antwerp)
- Les Misérables
- Elisabeth
- Saturday Night Fever
- Chicago
- Oliver!
- Fame
- Titanic
- Joe de Musical
- Sound of Music
- Mamma Mia!
- André van Duin Revues (6)
- Cyrano – De Musical
- The Phantom of the Opera
- Miss Saigon
- AIDA
- De La Guarda
- The Lion King
- De Fabeltjeskrant Musical
- Soldaat van Oranje (Soldier of Orange)
- Anne
- SKY

Moscow

- Cats

Concerts

- Level 42
- Manhattan Transfer
- Chippendales
- Burning Spear
- Gladiators
- Johnny Cash
- East Village Opera Company

Television

- Over a hundred prime time television entertainment productions for Dutch television for Joop van den Ende/Endemol
- De Fabeltjeskrant (The Daily Fable)

Commercials

- Pepsi (with Tina Turner and David Bowie)

Events

- Fokker 70
- Fokker 100
- 100 year Carré theatre spectacle
- Conceived
- Canon Concerto Gala Moscow 2006
- New Year's Eve 2008 Amsterdam Dam Square (Creative Director and Lighting Design)

== Awards ==
- Tony Award for Titanic (1997, Best Musical), 42nd Street (2001, Best Revival), Into the Woods (2002, Best Revival)

Nominated for Cyrano - The Musical, 42nd Street, The Music Man, Urinetown and Into the Woods

- Laurence Olivier Award in 1996 for The Who’s Tommy
- Outer Critics Circle Award for Victor/Victoria (1995), 42nd Street (2000) and Urinetown (2001)
- John Kraaijkamp Musical Award for AIDA (2002), Saturday Night Fever (2003) and De Fabeltjeskrant Musical (2008)

== Personal life ==
De Levita comes from a creative family. His father is TV producer Loek de Levita, best known for producing Dutch children’s television series De Fabeltjeskrant (The Daily Fable), and his mother is journalist Merel Laseur. He is the grandson of actress Mary Dresselhuys and actor/director Cees Laseur and twin brother of television- and film producer Alain de Levita.
