= Jan Gies =

Dutch Resistance member who helped hide Anne Frank

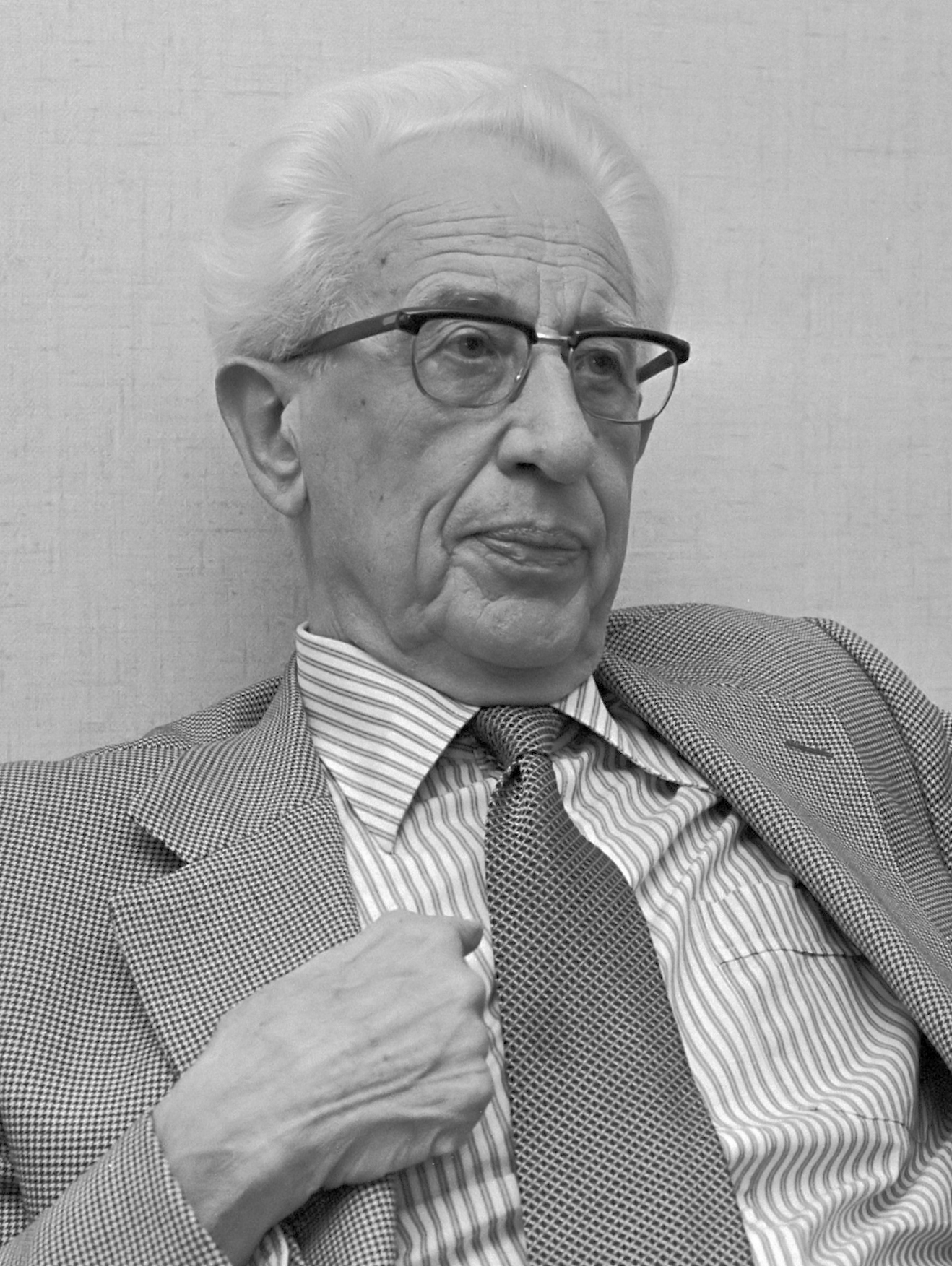
- Gies in 1980
- Born: Jan Augustus Gies; 18 August 1905; Amsterdam, Netherlands
- Died: 26 January 1993 (aged 87); Amsterdam, Netherlands
- Other name: Henk van Santen
- Spouse(s): Maria Margaretha Geertruida Netten (m. 1928–1940), Miep Gies (m. 1941)
- Children: 1

Jan Augustus Gies (Dutch pronunciation: [jɑŋ ˈɣis]; (Note: Jan in isolation: [jɑn].) 18 August 1905 – 26 January 1993) was a member of the Dutch Resistance who, with his wife, Miep, helped hide Anne Frank, her sister Margot, their parents Otto and Edith, the van Pels family, and Fritz Pfeffer from Nazi persecution during the occupation of the Netherlands by aiding them as they resided in the Secret Annex.

== Life ==
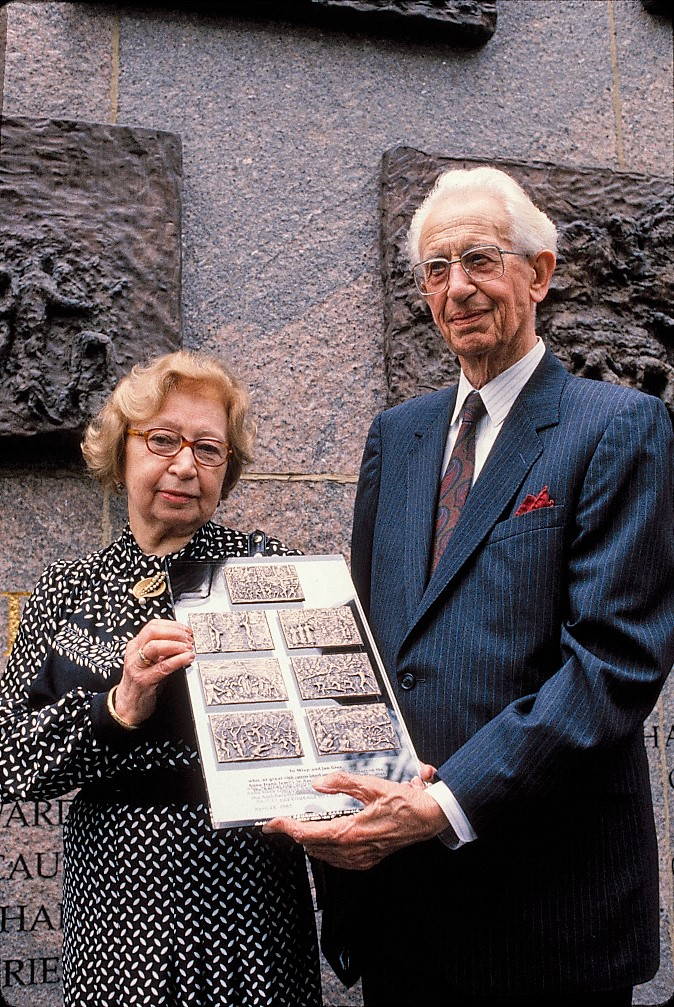
Miep and Jan Gies with plaque in 1987

Gies (also known as Henk van Santen in "Het Achterhuis", known in English as The Diary of Anne Frank) was born and raised in Amsterdam's south side. He met his future wife, Miep Gies, in 1933 when he was a bookkeeper and she an office worker at a local textile company. It was not until after they'd gone their separate ways - Jan into the Dutch Social Services and Miep to Otto Frank's company, Opekta - that they met each other again socially in 1936. They married in Amsterdam on 16 July 1941, when Miep was threatened with deportation back to Vienna after she refused to join a Nazi women's group. Their wedding was attended by Otto and Anne Frank, Hermann van Pels and his wife Auguste van Pels, and Miep's colleagues Victor Kugler, Bep Voskuijl, and Johannes Kleiman. Later that year, Gies was appointed the nominal director of Otto Frank's company after Frank was forced to resign from the board under the newly introduced Nazi laws which forbade Jews to hold directorships, and from then on, the company traded under the name Gies & Co.

As the persecution of Amsterdam's Jewish population intensified, he dedicated himself to assisting Jews and others escape by obtaining illegal ration cards for food, finding them hiding places, and securing British newspapers free from Nazi propaganda. Gies aided the Frank family's escape to their hiding place at the Gies & Co premises at 263 Prinsengracht. He visited frequently during their two-year confinement and with his wife, spent a night in the secret annex to experience the terror there for themselves.

In addition to their concealment of the Frank and van Pels families and of Fritz Pfeffer at the Prinsengracht, Miep and Jan also took in a student, who had refused to sign a Nazi oath. Following the arrest and deportation of the hidden families in August 1944, Miep, just like the younger secretary Bep Voskuijl, rescued parts of the diaries and other manuscripts of Anne Frank from the hiding place before it was ransacked by the Dutch secret police. Of the eight people Miep and Jan had assisted to hide, Otto Frank was the sole survivor. Upon Frank's return to Amsterdam in June 1945, he moved in with them and stayed with them for seven years before he emigrated to Switzerland to be close to his mother.

After the publication of Anne Frank's diary, under the title Het Achterhuis (The Backhouse; often translated as The Secret Annex) in 1947, Jan and Miep found themselves the subjects of media attention, particularly after the diary was translated into English as The Diary of a Young Girl and adapted for the stage and screen. They attended memorial ceremonies and gave lectures about Anne Frank and the importance of resisting fascism.

Jan and Miep Gies were recognised as Righteous Among the Nations by Yad Vashem on 8 March 1972.

== Death ==
In 1993, Jan Gies died at home from kidney failure, aged 87. He was survived by his wife, Hermine "Miep" Gies, who died at the age of 100 in 2010 and his son, Paul Gies, who was born in 1950, daughter-in-law Lucie, and three grandchildren, Erwin, Jeanine, and David.
