= IHI Stage Around Tokyo =

IHI STAGE AROUND TOKYO
- IHIステージアラウンド東京
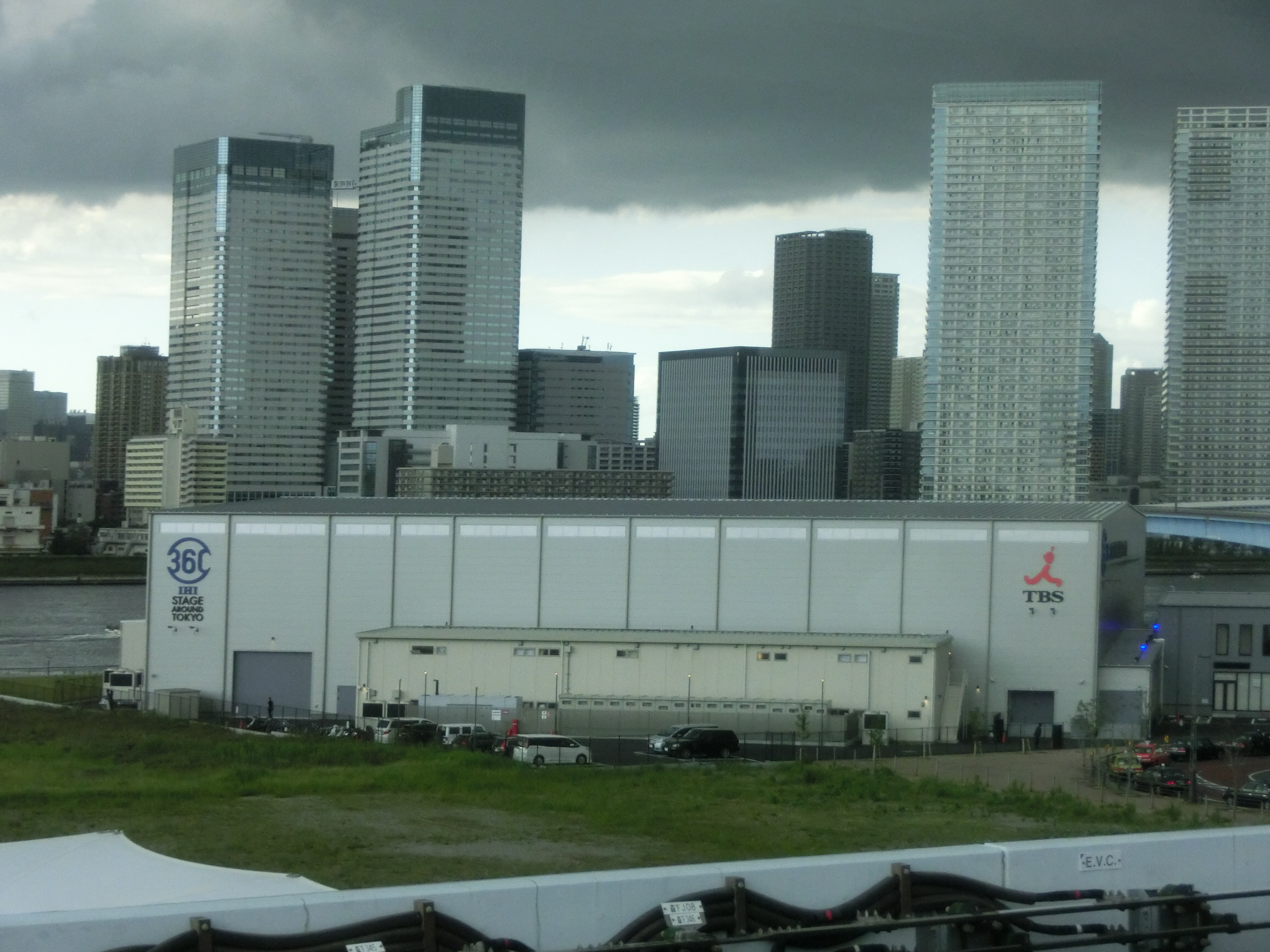
- IHI STAGE AROUND TOKYO（2018）
- Interactive map of the IHI STAGE AROUND TOKYO area

General information
- Location: 6-4-25, Koto ward, Tokyo, 135-0061
- Opened: 30 March 2017; 8 years ago
- Inaugurated: 30 March 2017; 8 years ago
- Closed: 30 April 2024; 22 months ago
- Owner: TBS

Other information
- Seating capacity: 1,314
- Public transit access: Shijō-mae Station

Website
- Official website

IHI Stage Around Tokyo (Japanese: IHIステージアラウンド東京, Hepburn: IHI Sutēji Araundo Tōkyō) was an amphitheatre located in Toyosu, Kōtō, Tokyo. It had a seating capacity of 1,314.

== Overview ==
The theatre was a 360-degree revolving amphitheatre, with a system similar to the SceneAround system used in TheaterHangaar, which the audience would be revolving around a 360-degree stage from scene to scene. Up to four stages can be built simultaneously. The theatre was operated by TBS Television.

The first performance was held on 30 March 2017, with Kazuki Nakashima's acclaimed samurai drama “Dokurojo no Shichinin” (“Seven Souls in the Skull Castle”). IHI Corporation acquired the naming rights of the theatre.

2023 would be last season of the theatre, with the closure announced to be in April 2024. Itochu Property Development and Sankei Building would be redeveloping the area into "CREVIA BASE Tokyo".

== See also ==
- Český Krumlov Castle - Containing an outdoor revolving amphitheatre
- Oshi no Ko: A manga series which contains a 2.5D musical titled "Tokyo Blade" that was staged at IHI Stage Around Tokyo.
