= Matteo van der Grijn =

Dutch actor

- Matteo van der Grijn in 2010
- Born: Matteo van der Grijn; 23 February 1981 (age 45); Amsterdam, the Netherlands
- Education: Toneelschool Arnhem
- Occupation: Actor
- Years active: 2002–present
- Spouse: Marije Hoebe (m. 2015)
- Children: 2

Matteo van der Grijn (Amsterdam, 23 February 1981) is a Dutch actor. He is known from many Dutch and some foreign feature films, TV productions, theatre productions, and as voice actor in animated movies.

== Early life and education ==
Van der Grijn is the son of actor Wim van der Grijn and actress Diane Lensink, and grandson of actor Ton Lensink and actress Henny Orri. Because his parents moved to Italy around the time he was born, he grew up in Vinazza, a tiny village in the Ligurian mountains where his mother ran a small holiday houses park. For this reason, apart from other languages, Van der Grijn speaks fluent Italian. After finishing middle school, he studied at former Toneelschool Arnhem (now part of ArtEZ University of the Arts), where he graduated in 2007.

== Professional life ==
One of the main parts that Van der Grijn played during his career so far, is that of Erik Hazelhoff in the musical Soldier of Orange, from October 2010 until July 2011, and from July 2012 until July 2014. After being in a guest role in the third season of Ted Lasso, he became a regular in the fourth season. Currently, he plays the role of Lumey in the musical Willem van Oranje about Dutch statesman William the Silent.

== Personal life ==
Van der Grijn married his wife Marije in 2015, and together they have a daughter and a son.
