= Valkenburg Naval Air Base =

Former Air Base in Katwijk/Leiden

Valkenburg Naval Air Base Vliegkamp Valkenburg
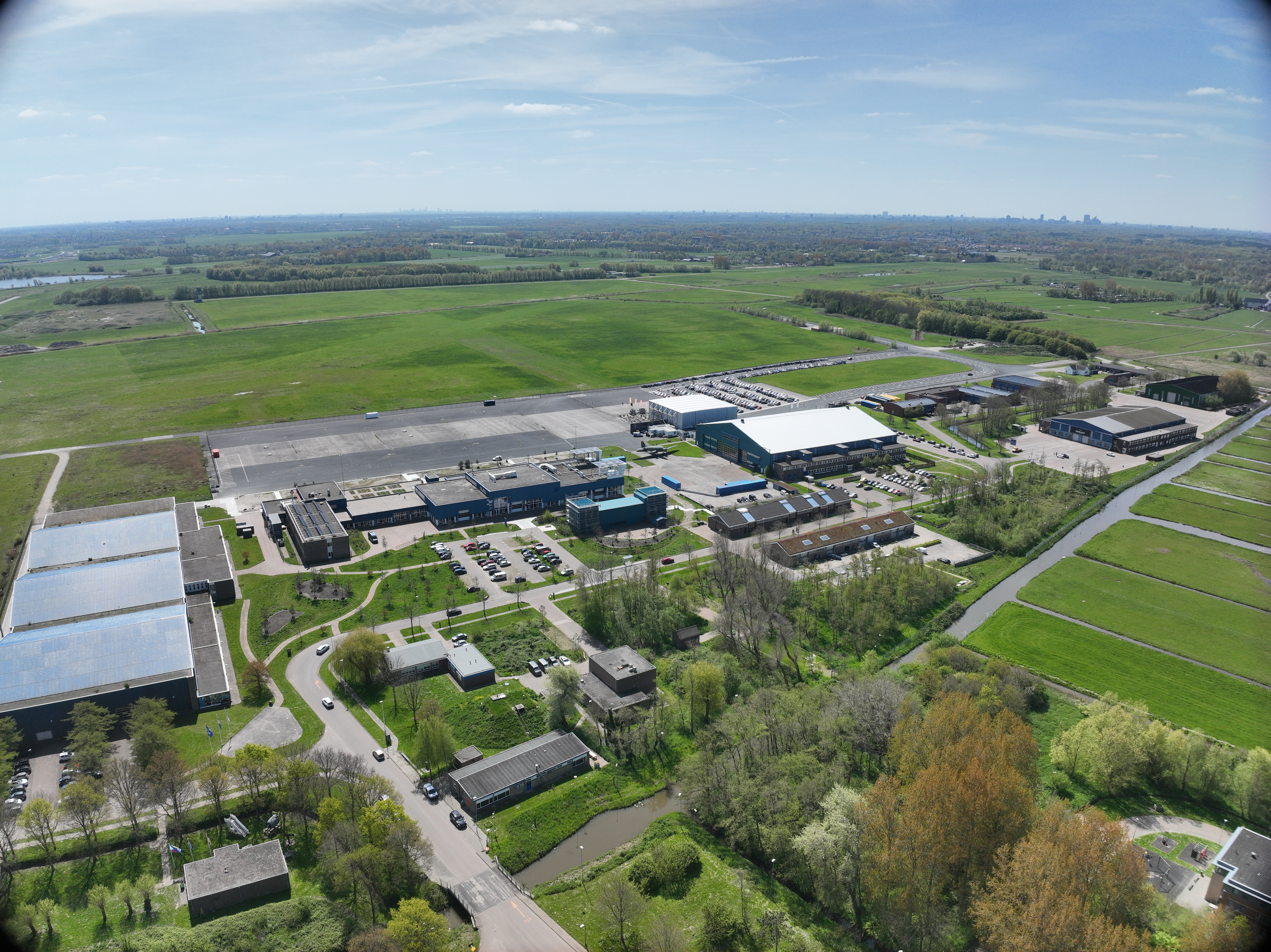
- IATA: ~~LID~~; ICAO: EHVB

Summary
- Airport type: Military
- Operator: Royal Netherlands Navy
- Location: Katwijk/Leiden
- Elevation AMSL: 0 ft (0 m)
- Coordinates: 52°10′00″N 004°25′09″E
- Interactive map of Valkenburg Naval Air Base

Runways
Direction	Length		Surface
Direction	ft	m	Surface
~~05/23~~ (closed)	8,006	2,440	Concrete/asphalt
~~16/34~~ (closed)	4,920	1,500	Concrete/asphalt

Valkenburg Naval Air Base (Dutch: Vliegkamp Valkenburg) (IATA: ~~LID~~, ICAO: EHVB) is a former air base located just south of Valkenburg, which is part of Katwijk and close to the city of Leiden, that was used by the Netherlands Naval Aviation Service until 2006, being their base for the Lockheed P-3 Orion aircraft. The Orions were sold to the German naval air arm and the Portuguese air force, resulting in the closure of the air base.

Though officially closed as an airport, it still sees limited use for special events and by gliders and occasionally small piston aircraft, most from the local flying club Aeroclub Valkenburg. Current plans are to use the area for housing development, but part of the former air base may remain in use for glider flying.

== History ==
Construction of the air base was commenced in 1939, but not completed before the start of the Second World War. Fights around the airfield during the Battle of the Netherlands resulted in significant losses on both sides. After Germany occupied the Netherlands, the German military completed construction of the air base for their own use, naming it Fliegerhorst Katwijk. It was used by the German Luftwaffe until 1943, when it was converted into a decoy airfield.

On 25 October 1941, it was the airfield from which Franz Von Werra (famed as "the one who got away," the only captured Luftwaffe fighter pilot to escape from imprisonment in Canada and to return to flying with the Luftwaffe) departed on his last flight, from which he did not return.

On 1 May 1945, the airfield was the drop zone for humanitarian food drops from American B-17 bombers, made with the permission of the occupying German forces, in Operation Chowhound.

After the war it briefly served as a home for the Royal Netherlands Air Force air transport wing, but in 1947 the Royal Netherlands Navy received control of the air base. After Ypenburg Airport was closed in 1992, many VIP flights for the government and the Royal Family moved to Valkenburg. The base closed in 2006 after the sale of the Navy's Lockheed P-3 Orion aircraft. The former air base still sees limited general aviation, mostly by the local Aeroclub Valkenburg. The area is expected to be redeveloped for housing however, with flying activities most likely being suspended in 2016. In 2010, one of the hangars of the base was converted into a theatre, and was being used for the musical Soldier of Orange ever since. The show closed on 12 July 2026.

In March 2014 Valkenburg was used as the home base for both police and military helicopters providing security during the 2014 Nuclear Security Summit. The military stationed Eurocopter Cougar, AH-64 Apache and CH-47 Chinook helicopters at the former Naval Air Base for this purpose. For additional anti-aircraft protection, the NASAMS system was also deployed. To support the operation, temporary fuel and ammunition storage was created and a temporary air traffic control tower was established.

In January 2018 engineer Henk Hesselink announced that he plans to use the air base to launch drones using a circular runway.

The air field briefly reopened in June 2025 to house military air defence for the NATO summit which took place in The Hague. Before that is has also repeatedly been used as exercise grounds for international military trainings.
