= 2001 in literature =

This article contains information about the literary events and publications of 2001.

== Events ==
- February 15 – The author Michael Crichton signs a new deal with HarperCollins Publishers that reportedly earns him $40 million for two books.
- April 1 – The BookCrossing scheme for leaving books for strangers to find is launched.
- April 13 – The film version of Helen Fielding's 1996 novel Bridget Jones's Diary has uncredited cameo roles as themselves for Salman Rushdie, Julian Barnes and Jeffrey Archer, at a literary party.
- July 19 – The English popular novelist and politician Jeffrey Archer, having been found guilty of perjury in a libel trial, is sentenced to imprisonment.
- September 19 – Amiri Baraka reads his poem "Somebody Blew Up America?" at a poetry festival in New Jersey, eight days after the September 11 attacks.
- November 4 – Film premiere of Harry Potter and the Philosopher's Stone, first in the commercially successful Harry Potter film series based on the novels of J. K. Rowling.
- December 10 – The live-action film version of J. R. R. Tolkien's The Lord of the Rings: The Fellowship of the Ring, directed by Peter Jackson, opens in London. Its appearance has a strong impact on readership of the trilogy.

== New books ==
=== Fiction ===
- Niccolò Ammaniti – Io non ho paura
- Hiromu Arakawa – Fullmetal Alchemist (鋼の錬金術師, Hagane no Renkinjutsushi, manga series, begins publication)
- Tahar Ben Jelloun – Cette aveuglante absence de lumière (This Blinding Absence of Light)
- Raymond Benson – Never Dream of Dying
- Dennis Bock – The Ash Garden
- Ben Bova – The Precipice
- Geraldine Brooks – Year of Wonders
- Lois McMaster Bujold – The Curse of Chalion
- Javier Cercas – Soldiers of Salamis (Soldados de Salamina)
- Joseph Connolly – S.O.S.
- Bernard Cornwell
  - Sharpe's Trafalgar
  - Gallows Thief
- Douglas Coupland – All Families Are Psychotic
- Achmat Dangor – Bitter Fruit
- Helen Dunmore – The Siege
- Umberto Eco – Baudolino
- James Ellroy – The Cold Six Thousand
- Leif Enger – Peace Like a River
- Sebastian Faulks – On Green Dolphin Street
- Ken Follett – Jackdaws
- Leon Forrest – Meteor in the Madhouse
- Jonathan Franzen – The Corrections
- Rodrigo Fresán – Mantra
- Diana Gabaldon – The Fiery Cross
- Neil Gaiman – American Gods
- Kate Grenville – The Idea of Perfection
- John Grisham
  - A Painted House
  - Skipping Christmas
- Abdulrazak Gurnah – By the Sea
- Margaret Peterson Haddix – Among the Impostors
- Joanne Harris – Five Quarters of the Orange
- Vigdis Hjorth – Om bare (If only)
- Nick Hornby – How to Be Good
- Silas House – Clay's Quilt
- Nancy Huston – Dolce Agonia
- John Irving – The Fourth Hand
- Fleur Jaeggy – Proleterka
- P. D. James – Death in Holy Orders
- Greg Keyes
- Edge of Victory: Conquest
- Edge of Victory: Rebirth
- Stephen King
  - Black House
  - Dreamcatcher
- Christian Kracht – 1979
- Hanif Kureishi – Gabriel's Gift
- Joe R. Lansdale – Captains Outrageous
- John le Carré – The Constant Gardener
- Ursula K. Le Guin – The Birthday of the World, and Other Stories
- Pedro Lemebel – Tengo miedo torero (My Tender Matador)
- Mario Vargas Llosa – The Feast of the Goat (La fiesta del chivo)
- David Lodge – Thinks ...
- James Luceno – Cloak of Deception
- Ian McEwan – Atonement
- Andreï Makine – Music of a Life (La Musique d'une vie)
- Juliet Marillier – Child of the Prophecy
- Yann Martel – Life of Pi
- Alice Munro – Hateship, Friendship, Courtship, Loveship, Marriage (short stories)
- V S Naipaul – Half a Life
- R. K. Narayan – Under the Banyan Tree
- Joyce Carol Oates – Middle Age: A Romance
- Chuck Palahniuk – Choke
- Noni Power – Crawling at Night
- Terry Pratchett
  - The Amazing Maurice and his Educated Rodents
  - Thief of Time
  - The Last Hero
- Sven Regener – Herr Lehmann
- Kathy Reichs – Fatal Voyage
- Alain Robbe-Grillet – La Reprise
- Jean-Christophe Rufin – Rouge Brésil
- Salman Rushdie – Fury
- Richard Russo – Empire Falls
- W. G. Sebald – Austerlitz
- Nava Semel – And the Rat Laughed (ואת צחוק של עכברוש)
- Olga Slavnikova – Bessmertniy (The Immortal)
- Danielle Steel – Leap of Faith
- Antonio Tabucchi – It's Getting Later All the Time
- Amy Tan – The Bonesetter's Daughter
- Timothy Taylor – Stanley Park
- Anne Tyler – Back When We Were Grownups
- Jane Urquhart – The Stone Carvers
- Andrew Vachss – Pain Management
- Tim Winton – Dirt Music
- Carlos Ruiz Zafón – La sombra del viento (The Shadow of the Wind; first in El cementerio de los libros olvidados (The Cemetery of Forgotten Books) series)
- Juli Zeh – Eagles and Angels

=== Children and young people ===
- David Almond – Secret Heart
- Malorie Blackman – Noughts and Crosses (first in the Noughts and Crosses series of five books)
- Ann Brashare – The Sisterhood of the Traveling Pants
- Eoin Colfer – Artemis Fowl (first in the eponymous series of eight books)
- Eva Ibbotson – Journey to the River Sea
- Brian Jacques – Castaways of the Flying Dutchman
- David Klass – You Don't Know Me
- Hilary McKay – Saffy's Angel
- Patricia McKissack – Goin' Someplace Special
- Michael Morpurgo
  - More Muck and Magic
  - Out of the Ashes
  - Toro! Toro!
- Lesléa Newman – Cats, Cats, Cats!
- Linda Sue Park – A Single Shard
- Philip Reeve – Mortal Engines (November 16)
- J. K. Rowling – Harry Potter and the Goblet of Fire
- Lemony Snicket
  - The Ersatz Elevator
  - The Vile Village
  - The Hostile Hospital
- Jacqueline Wilson – Sleepovers

=== Drama ===
- Richard Alfieri – Six Dance Lessons in Six Weeks
- Gurpreet Kaur Bhatti – Behsharam (Shameless)
- Abdelkader Benali – Yasser
- Jon Fosse – Dødsvariasjonar (Death Variations)
- Neil LaBute – The Shape of Things
- Lynn Manning – Weights
- Peter Morris – The Age of Consent
- Zlatko Topčić – Time Out

=== Poetry ===
- Anne Carson – The Beauty of the Husband

=== Non-fiction ===
- David Allen – Getting Things Done
- Tom Allen – Rolling Home
- Jan Bondeson – Buried Alive: The Terrifying History of Our Most Primal Fear
- Dionne Brand – A Map to the Door of No Return: Notes to Belonging
- Edwin Bryant – The Quest for the Origins of Vedic Culture
- Joan Didion – Political Fictions
- Eamon Duffy – The Voices of Morebath. Reformation and Rebellion in an English Village
- Barbara Ehrenreich – Nickel and Dimed
- Koenraad Elst – The Saffron Swastika
- Mem Fox – Reading Magic
- Antonia Fraser – Marie Antoinette: The Journey
- Dorothy Gallagher – How I Came Into My Inheritance and Other True Stories
- Stephen Hawking – The Universe in a Nutshell
- Laura Hillenbrand – Seabiscuit: An American Legend
- Christopher Hitchens – The Trial of Henry Kissinger
- Gary Lachman – Turn Off Your Mind
- Lawrence Lessig – The Future of Ideas
- Normand Lester – Le Livre noir du Canada Anglais (The Black Book of English Canada)
- Steven Levy – Crypto: How the Code Rebels Beat the Government—Saving Privacy in the Digital Age
- Margaret MacMillan – Peacemakers: The Paris Peace Conference of 1919 and Its Attempt to End War
- Michael Moore – Stupid White Men
- Mumtaz Mufti – Ali Pur Ka Aeeli
- Pavel Polian – Against Their Will... A History and Geography of Forced Migrations in the USSR
- E. Hoffmann Price – Book of the Dead
- Eric Schlosser – Fast Food Nation
- Miranda Seymour – Mary Shelley
- Andrew Solomon – The Noonday Demon: An Atlas of Depression
- Ben Thompson - Ways of Hearing
- Türkmenbaşy – Ruhnama (The Book of the Soul, first part)
- Ivan Vladislavic – The Restless Supermarket
- Frans de Waal – The Ape and the Sushi Master
- Benjamin Woolley – The Queen's Conjuror: The Science and Magic of Dr. Dee

== Deaths ==
- January 5 – G. E. M. Anscombe, English analytic philosopher (died 2001)
- January 8 – Catherine Storr, English children's writer (born 1913)
- January 11 – Lorna Sage, English scholar (born 1943)
- January 31 – Gordon R. Dickson, Canadian-born American science fiction writer (born 1923)
- February 7 – Anne Morrow Lindbergh, American author and aviator (born 1906)
- February 14
  - Alan Ross, Indian-born English poet and editor (born 1922)
  - Richard Laymon, American horror fiction writer (born 1947)
- March 1 – Mahmud Arif, Saudi Arabian poet (born 1909)
- March 12 – Robert Ludlum, American novelist (born 1927)
- May 11 – Douglas Adams, English writer, humorist and dramatist (born 1952)
- May 13
  - Jason Miller, American actor and playwright (born 1939)
  - R. K. Narayan, Indian novelist writing in English (born 1906)
- June 1 – Hank Ketcham, American cartoonist (born 1920)
- June 27 – Tove Jansson, Finnish children's author writing in Swedish (born 1914)
- July 3 – Mordecai Richler, Canadian author, screenwriter and essayist (born 1931)
- July 18 – James Hatfield, American author (born 1958)
- July 31 – Poul Anderson, American fantasy and sci-fi author (born 1926)
- August 6 – Jorge Amado, Brazilian writer (born 1912)
- August 20 – Fred Hoyle, English astronomer and science fiction writer (born 1915)
- November 10 – Ken Kesey, American author (born 1935)
- November 25 – David Gascoyne, English surrealist poet (born 1916)
- December 21 – Dick Schaap, American journalist and author (born 1934)
- December 14 – W. G. Sebald, German novelist and academic (born 1944)

== Awards ==
- Nobel Prize for Literature: V.S. Naipaul

=== Australia ===
- Miles Franklin Award: Frank Moorhouse, Dark Palace

=== Canada ===
- Giller Prize for Canadian Fiction: Richard B. Wright – Clara Callan
- See 2001 Governor General's Awards for a complete list of winners and finalists for those awards.
- Edna Staebler Award for Creative Non-Fiction: Taras Grescoe – Sacré Blues

=== France ===
- Prix Décembre: Chloé Delaume, Le Cri du sablier
- Prix Femina: Marie Ndiaye, Rosie Carpe
- Prix Goncourt: Jean-Christophe Rufin, Rouge Brésil
- Prix Médicis French: Edwy Plenel, Secrets de jeunesse
- Prix Médicis Non-Fiction: Le Loup mongol
- Prix Médicis International: Antonio Skarmeta, La noce du poète

=== United Kingdom ===
- Booker Prize: Peter Carey, True History of the Kelly Gang
- Carnegie Medal for children's literature: Terry Pratchett, The Amazing Maurice and his Educated Rodents
- James Tait Black Memorial Prize for fiction: Sid Smith, Something Like a House
- James Tait Black Memorial Prize for biography: Robert Skidelsky, John Maynard Keynes: Volume 3 – Fighting for Britain 1937–1946
- Caine Prize for African Writing: Helon Habila, "Love Poems"
- Cholmondeley Award: Ian Duhig, Paul Durcan, Kathleen Jamie, Grace Nichols
- Eric Gregory Award: Leontia Flynn, Thomas Warner, Tishani Doshi, Patrick Mackie, Kathryn Gray, Sally Read
- Griffin Poetry Prize: Anne Carson, Men in the Off Hours and Nikolai Popov and Heather McHugh, translation of Glottal Stop: 101 Poems by Paul Celan
- Hugo Award: J. K. Rowling, Harry Potter and the Goblet of Fire
- Samuel Johnson Prize: Michael Burleigh, The Third Reich
- Queen's Gold Medal for Poetry: Michael Longley
- Orange Prize for Fiction: Kate Grenville, The Idea of Perfection
- Whitbread Best Book Award: Patrick Neate, Twelve Bar Blues

=== United States ===
- Agnes Lynch Starrett Poetry Prize awarded to Gabriel Gudding for A Defense of Poetry
- Aiken Taylor Award for Modern American Poetry, Frederick Morgan
- Bernard F. Connors Prize for Poetry, Gabrielle Calvocoressi, “Circus Fire, 1944”
- Bollingen Prize for Poetry, Louise Glück
- Brittingham Prize in Poetry, Robin Behn, Horizon Note
- Compton Crook Award: Syne Mitchell, Murphy's Gambit
- Frost Medal: Sonia Sanchez
- Hugo Award: J.K. Rowling, Harry Potter and the Goblet of Fire
- Newbery Medal for children's literature: Richard Peck, A Year Down Yonder
- National Book Award for Fiction: to The Corrections by Jonathan Franzen
- National Book Critics Circle Award: to Austerlitz by W.G. Sebald
- PEN/Faulkner Award for Fiction: to Philip Roth for The Human Stain
- Pulitzer Prize for Drama: David Auburn, Proof
- Pulitzer Prize for Fiction: Michael Chabon, The Amazing Adventures of Kavalier & Clay
- Pulitzer Prize for Poetry: Stephen Dunn, Different Hours
- Wallace Stevens Award: John Ashbery
- Whiting Awards:

Fiction: Emily Carter, Matthew Klam, Akhil Sharma, Samrat Upadhyay, John Wray
Nonfiction: Judy Blunt, Kathleen Finneran
Plays: Brighde Mullins
Poetry: Joel Brouwer, Jason Sommer

=== Other ===
- Camões Prize: Eugénio de Andrade
- Europe Theatre Prize: Lev Dodin, Michel Piccoli
- Finlandia Prize: Hannu Raittila, Canal Grande
- Friedenspreis des Deutschen Buchhandels: Jürgen Habermas
- International Dublin Literary Award: Alistair MacLeod, No Great Mischief
- Premio Nadal: Fernando Marías, El Niño de los Coroneles
- Premio Strega: Domenico Starnone, Via Gemito
- Premio de Novela Ciudad de Torrevieja (first award): Javier Reverte, La Noche Detenida
- Premio Antón Losada Diéguez (category Creación literaria): Xurxo Borrazás, Na maleta
- SAARC Literary Award: Ganesh Narayandas Devy, Shamsur Rahman
- Viareggio Prize: Niccolò Ammaniti, Io non ho paura, Michele Ranchetti, Verbale, and Giorgio Pestelli, Canti del destino
