= Gerben =

Gerben is a masculine name of Germanic origin. Notable people with the name are as follows:

- Gerben Broeren (born 1972), Dutch cyclist
- Gerben-Jan Gerbrandy (born 1967), Dutch politician
- Gerben Hellinga Jr (born 1938), Dutch writer
- Gerben Jorritsma (born 1993), Dutch speed skater
- Gerben Karstens (1942–2022), Dutch cyclist
- Gerben de Knegt (born 1975), Dutch cyclist
- Gerben Kuypers (born 2000), Belgian cyclist
- Gerben Last (born 1985), Dutch para table tennis player
- Gerben Löwik (born 1977), Dutch cyclist
- Gerben Moerman (born 1976), Dutch sociologist
- Gerben Mulder (born 1972), Dutch artist
- Gerben Silvis (born 1976), Dutch water polo player
- Gerben Thijssen (born 1998), Belgian cyclist
- Gerben Wagenaar (1912–1993), Dutch politician
- Gerben Wiersma (born 1977), Dutch artistic gymnastics coach
- Gerben Wynia (born 1958), Dutch writer
- Gerben Zylstra (born 1959), American biochemist
