= Sluice =

Water channel controlled at its head by a gate

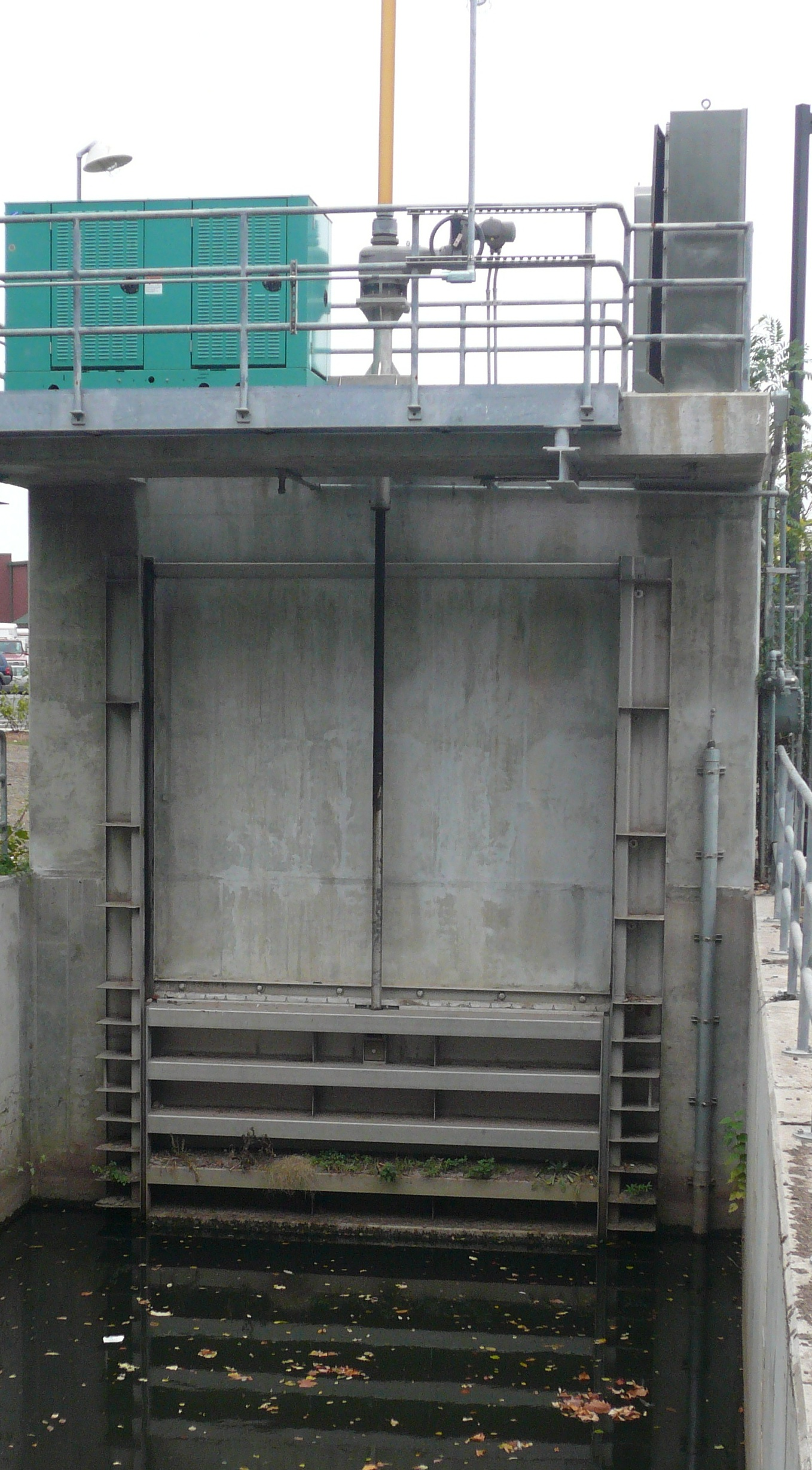
A sluice gate

A sluice (/slus/ SLOOS) is a water channel containing a sluice gate, a type of lock to manage water flow and water level. There are various types of sluice gates, including flap sluice gates and fan gates.

Sluices are used for channeling water toward a water mill, including for transporting logs from steep hillsides. Different terms are used regionally for sluices; the terms sluice, sluice gate, knife gate, and slide gate are used interchangeably in the water and wastewater control industry.

== Etymology ==
The term "sluice" originates from the Middle English word scluse, which derived from the Old French escluse (modern French: écluse). This, in turn, came from the Late Latin exclusa, a shortening of aqua exclusa, meaning "excluded water" or "a shut-off water channel". The Latin exclusa is the feminine past participle of excludere ("to shut out, exclude"), from ex- ("out") and claudere ("to close").

=== Regional names ===
- In the Somerset Levels, sluice gates are known as clyse or clyce.
- Most of the inhabitants of Guyana refer to sluices as kokers.
- The Sinhala people in Sri Lanka, who had an ancient civilization based on harvested rain water, refer to sluices as Sorowwa.

== Description ==
A sluice is a water channel containing a sluice gate, a movable gate allowing water to flow under it. Sluices are a type of lock to manage the water flow and water level. When a sluice is lowered, water may spill over the top, in which case the gate operates as a weir. Usually, a mechanism drives the sluice up or down. This may be a simple, hand-operated, chain pulled/lowered, worm drive or rack-and-pinion drive, or it may be electrically or hydraulically powered. A flap sluice, however, operates automatically, without external intervention or inputs.

== Basic design ==
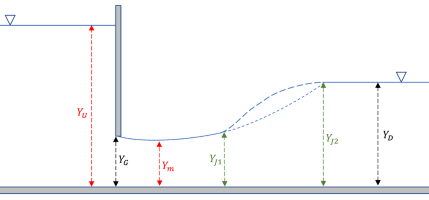
The important parameters in designing sluice gates.

Sluice gates are one of the most common hydraulic structures used to control or measure the flow in open channels. Vertical rising sluice gates are the most common in open channels and can operate under two flow regimes: free flow and submerged flow. The most important depths in the designing of sluice gates are:

- $Y_U$: upstream depth
- $Y_G$: opening of the sluice gate
- $Y_m$: the minimum depth of flow after the sluice gate
- $Y_{J1}$: the initial depth of the hydraulic jump
- $Y_{J2}$: the secondary depth of the hydraulic jump
- $Y_D$: downstream depth

== Types ==
Plan view of a fan sluice (flow from bottom to top of diagram) (Note: gray areas are the inner empty spaces in which water can flow.) 1: Tube connecting the chamber to the high water side of the sluice 2: Gates to regulate the water level in the chamber. Only one gate may be opened at a time 3: Tube connecting the chamber to the low water side of the sluice 4: The chamber in which the water level can be controlled 5: Door with larger surface 6: Door with smaller surface. When the tube to the high water level side (1) is opened, the water level in the chamber (4) will rise to this same level. As there is no height difference across the larger gate (5), it exerts no force. However, the smaller gate (6) has a higher level on the upstream side, which exerts a force to close the gate (counter-clockwise). When the tube to the low water side (3) is opened, the water level in the chamber (4) will fall, and a force will be exerted on the large door (5) in the opening direction (clockwise). The pressure difference on both doors is the same, but the surface area is not. This ensures that the opening force (on 5) overcomes the closing one (on 6), which causes the gate to turn clockwise and open.

Fan gate
(Dutch: waaiersluis) This type of gate was invented by the Dutch hydraulic engineer Jan Blanken in 1808. He was Inspector-General for Waterstaat (Water resource management) of the Kingdom of Holland at the time. The fan door has the special property that it can open in the direction of high water solely using water pressure. This gate type was primarily used to purposely inundate certain regions, for instance in the case of the Hollandic Water Line. Nowadays this type of gate can still be found in a few places, for example in Gouda. A fan gate has a separate chamber that can be filled with water and is separated on the high-water-level side of the sluice by a large door. When a tube connecting the separate chamber with the high-water-level side of the sluice is opened, the water level, and with that the water pressure in this chamber, will rise to the same level as that on the high-water-level side. As there is no height difference across the larger gate, it exerts no force. However the smaller gate has a higher level on the upstream side, which exerts a force to close the gate. When the tube to the low water side is opened the water level in the chamber will fall. Due to the difference in the surface areas of the doors there will be a net force opening the gate.
Flap sluice gate
A fully automatic type, controlled by the pressure head across it; operation is similar to that of a check valve. It is a gate hinged at the top. When pressure is from one side, the gate is kept closed; a pressure from the other side opens the sluice when a threshold pressure is surpassed.
Logging sluices
In the mountains of the United States, sluices transported logs from steep hillsides to downslope sawmill ponds or yarding areas. Nineteenth-century logging was traditionally a winter activity for men who spent summers working on farms. Where there were freezing nights, water might be applied to logging sluices every night so a fresh coating of slippery ice would reduce friction of logs placed in the sluice the following morning.
Mill race
A mill race, leet, flume, penstock or lade is a sluice channeling water toward a water mill.
Needle sluice
A sluice formed by a number of thin needles held against a solid frame through water pressure as in a needle dam.
Radial sluice gate
A structure, where a small part of a cylindrical surface serves as the gate, supported by radial constructions going through the cylinder's radius. On occasion, a counterweight is provided.
Rising sector sluice gate
Also a part of a cylindrical surface, which rests at the bottom of the channel and rises by rotating around its centre.
Vertical rising sluice gate
A plate sliding in the vertical direction, which may be controlled by machinery.

== Gallery ==
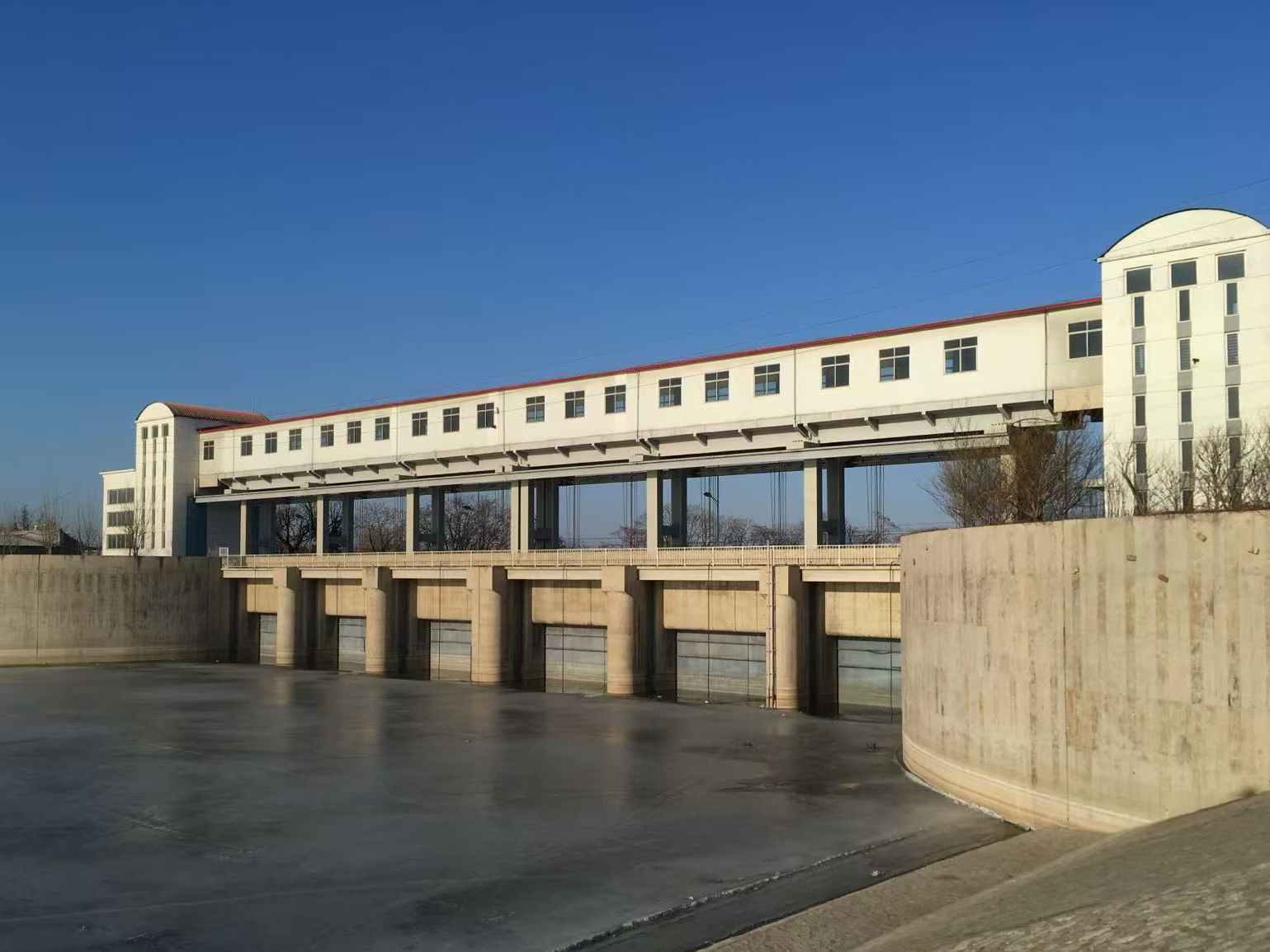
Xihe Regulating Sluice in Yangliuqing Town, Xiqing District, Tianjin Municipality

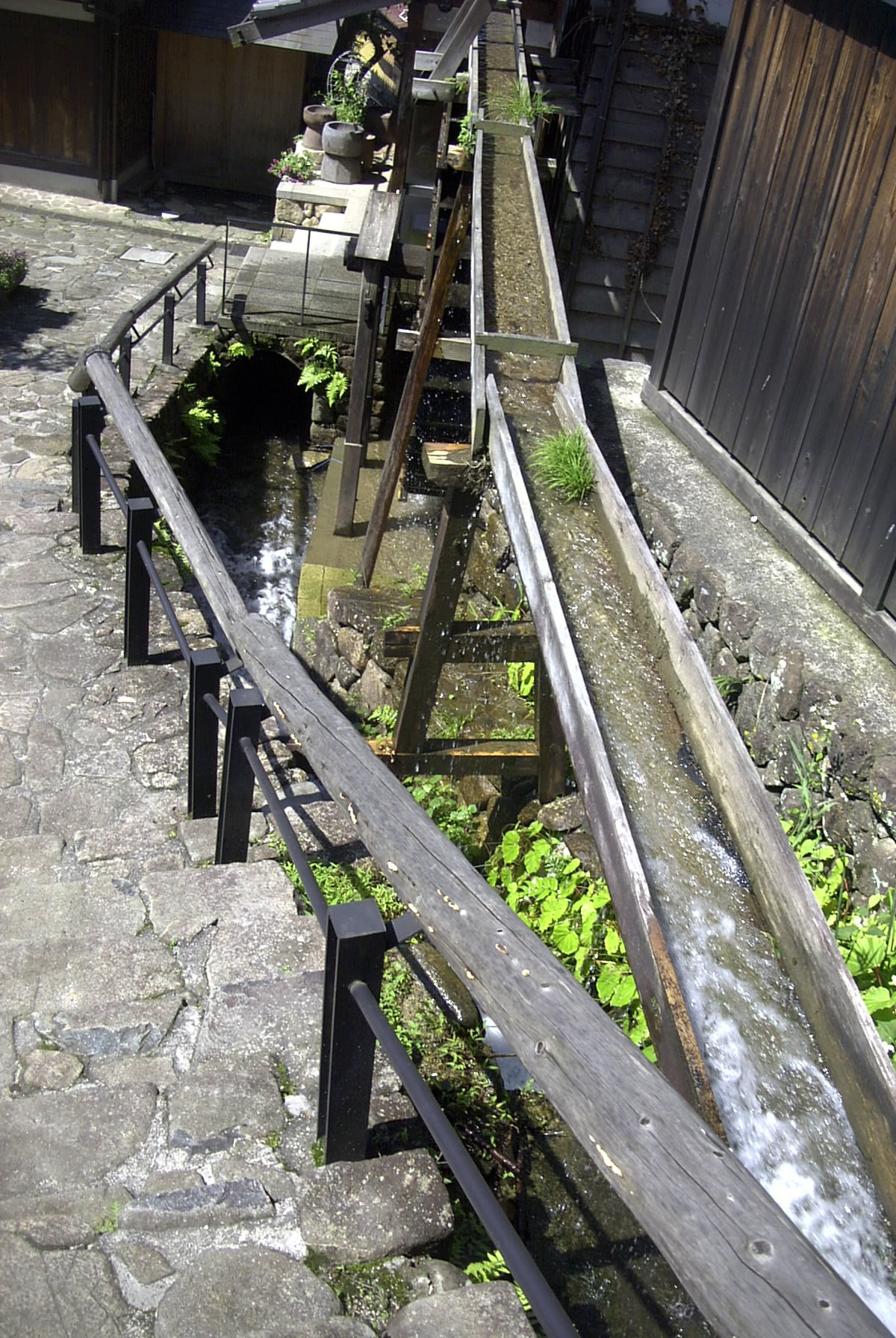
A small wooden sluice in Magome, Japan, used to power a waterwheel

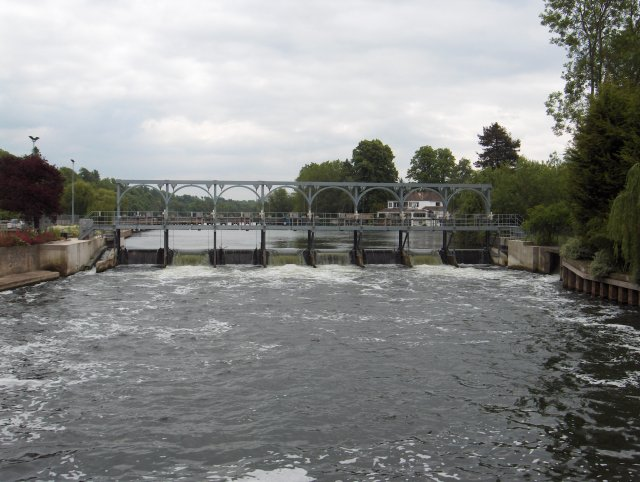
Sluice gates near Henley, on the River Thames

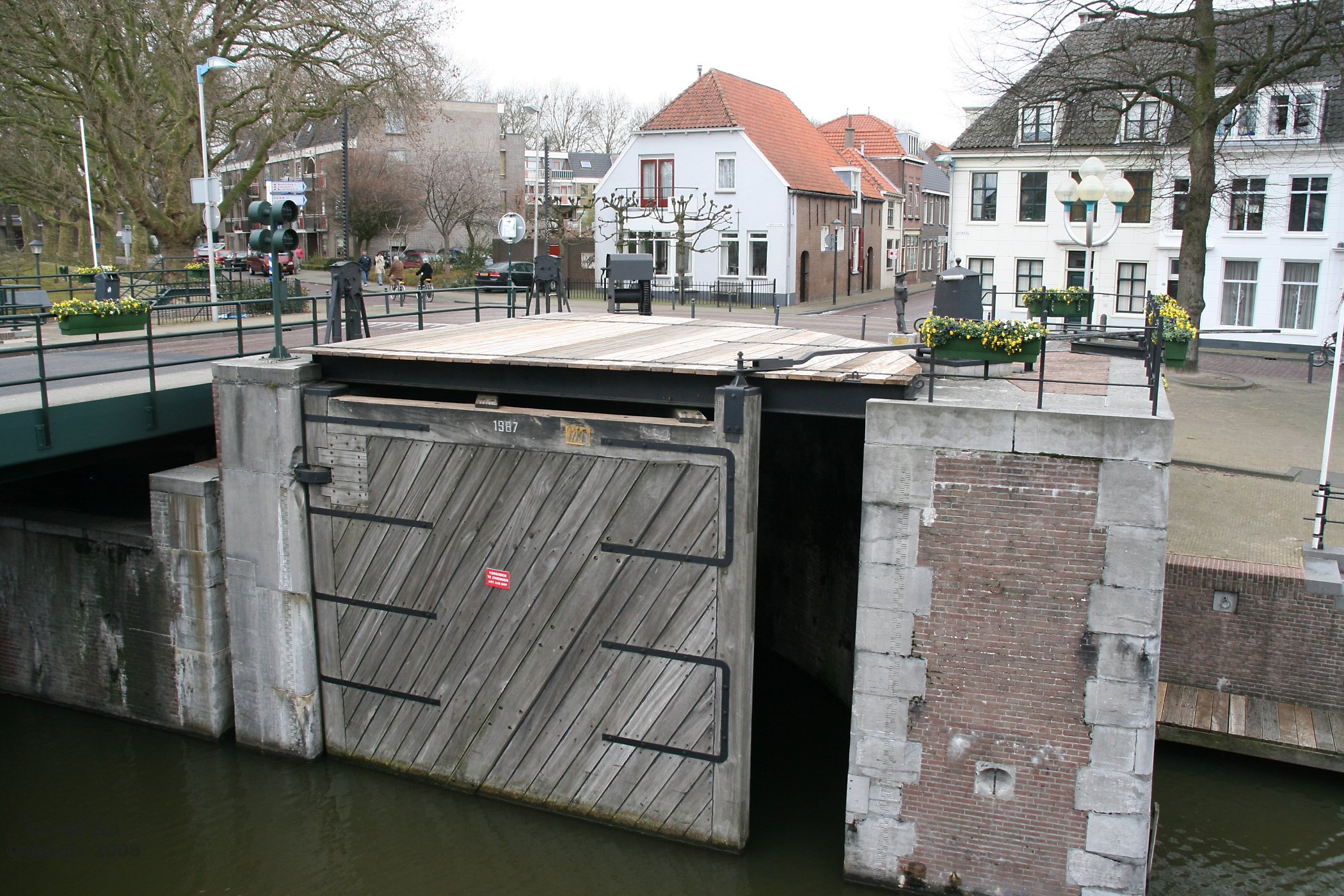
The Korenbrugsluice in Gorinchem is a fan sluice

== See also ==
- Canal
  - List of canals by country
- Hydraulic engineering
  - Control lock
  - Gatehouse (waterworks) – An (elaborate) structure to house a sluice gate
  - Floodgate
  - Lock
  - Rhyne, drainage ditch in coastal areas
- Sluice related family names
  - Zijlstra – A Dutch name referring to one who lives near a sluice
  - Van der Sluijs – A Dutch name originating from the Sluice
