= Wiersma =

Wiersma is a surname of West Frisian origin. It originated as a patronymic surname, "son of Wier", an old Frisian name that was a contraction of German -wig- ("battle") and -her- ("lord"). Notable people with the surname include:

- Abe Wiersma (born 1994), Dutch rower
- Dennis Wiersma (born 1986), Dutch politician
- Femke Wiersma (born 1984), Dutch politician
- Gerben Wiersma (born 1977), Dutch gymnastics coach
- Harm Wiersma (born 1953), Dutch draughts player
- Jan Marinus Wiersma (born 1951), Dutch politician
- Jelmer Wiersma, Dutch heavy-metal guitarist
- Marjolein Lips-Wiersma, New Zealand academic
- Roel Wiersma (1932–1995), Dutch footballer

== See also ==
- Wiersema
