= Finnerman =

Finnerman is a surname. Notable people with the surname include:

- Gerald Finnerman (1931-2011), American cinematographer
- Finnerman, character in Hunters (2016 TV series)

== See also ==
- Finneran
