= Finneran =

Finneran is an Irish surname that may refer to:

- Finneran (1876–1961), American baseball umpire
- Brian Finneran (born 1976), American football player
- Gary Finneran (American football) (born 1934), American football player
- Gary Finneran (1964–2009), American singer-songwriter, frontman for the band Ex-Idols
- Gerard Finneran (1937–2004), American banker
- Happy Finneran (1890–1942), American baseball player
- Kathleen Finneran (born 1957), American author
- Katie Finneran (born 1971), American film, stage and television actress
- Kevin Finneran, American lacrosse player and coach
- Michael Finneran (born 1947), Irish footballer and politician
- Mike Finneran (born 1948), American diver
- Ron Finneran (born 1944), Australian Paralympic athlete and sports administrator
- Sharon Finneran (born 1946), American swimmer
- Siobhan Finneran (born 1966), British actress
- Thomas Finneran (born 1950), American radio talk host and politician
