= Zijlstra =

Zijlstra is a West Frisian toponymic or occupational surname meaning "from/of the Zijl", a Middle Dutch name for a type of sluice (Modern Dutch Spuisluis, German Siel). The suffix "-stra" is derived from old Germanic -sater, meaning sitter or dweller. The name could thus be referring to a lock keeper. Variant forms are Zeijlstra, Zeilstra, Zylstra, and Sylstra. The latter is the common spelling abroad. People with this name include:

- Anca Zijlstra (born 1973), Dutch darts player
- Auke Zijlstra (born 1964), Dutch politician (PVV)
- Carla Zijlstra (born 1969), Dutch speed skater
- Halbe Zijlstra (born 1969), Dutch politician (VVD), Minister of Foreign Affairs 2017–18
- Hieke Zijlstra (born 1981), Dutch footballer
- Jelle Zijlstra (1918–2001), Dutch politician (ARP), economist and banker, Prime Minister 1966–67
- Kees Zijlstra (1931–2013), Dutch politician (PvdA) and civil servant
- Martin Zijlstra (1944–2014), Dutch politician (PvdA)
- Mauro Zijlstra (born 2004), Dutch-born Indonesian footballer
- Rinse Zijlstra (1927–2017), Dutch politician (ARP), brother of Jelle
- Sipke Zijlstra (born 1985), Dutch racing cyclist
- Wout Zijlstra (born 1964), Dutch strongman

Zeilstra

- Bart Zeilstra (born 1982), Dutch rapper and singer known as "Baas B"

Zylstra

- Bernard Zylstra (1934–1986), Canadian political scientist
- Brandon Zylstra (born 1993), American football player
- Gerben Zylstra (born 1959), American biochemist
- Lynne Zylstra (1945 - 2023), New Zealand artist
- Shane Zylstra (born 1996), American football player
