= The Abyssinian =

1997 novel by Jean-Christophe Rufin

- Author: Jean-Christophe Rufin
- Original title: L'Abyssin
- Translator: Willard Wood
- Language: French
- Genre: Historical novel
- Publisher: W W Norton (USA Eng. trans.)
- Publication date: 1997 (orig) (October 1999 - US Eng trans.)
- Publication place: France
- Media type: Print (Hardback & Paperback)
- Pages: 448 pp (US Eng trans.)
- ISBN: 978-0-393-04716-5 (US Eng trans.)
- OCLC: 40964974
- Dewey Decimal: 843/.914 21
- LC Class: PQ2678.U357 A62913 1999
- Followed by: The Siege of Isfahan

The Abyssinian (French: L'Abyssin) is a 1997 historical adventure novel by Jean-Christophe Rufin.

== Plot introduction ==
The Abyssinian tells the story of a young French physician who is sent as part of a diplomatic mission to Abyssinia in the early eighteenth century. Along the way he must face various perils while trying to win over his true love.

== Characters in "The Abyssinian" ==
- Jean-Baptiste Poncet: a French apothecarian who has been practicing medicine without a formal license.
- Maître Juremi: a colleague of Jean-Baptiste who has fled France because of his Protestant religious beliefs
- Monsieur de Maillet: the French consul in Cairo
- Monsieur de Macé: an expert linguist who works for Monsieur de Maillet
