= Brazil Red =

2001 novel by Jean-Christophe Rufin

- Author: Jean-Christophe Rufin
- Original title: Rouge Brésil
- Language: French
- Genre: Historical fiction
- Publisher: Gallimard
- Publication date: 2001
- Publication place: France
- Media type: Print
- Pages: 550 p.
- ISBN: 9782070761982
- OCLC: 300915601

Brazil Red (French: Rouge Brésil; Portuguese: Vermelho Brasil) is a 2001 French historical novel by Jean-Christophe Rufin which recounts the unsuccessful French attempt to conquer Brazil in the 16th century, against a background of wars of religion and a rite-of-passage discovery of the charms and secrets of the Amerindian world. It won the 2001 Prix Goncourt.

== Plot ==
The plot is set in 1555, on a small island in the Guanabara Bay of Rio de Janeiro, where a French expeditionary force, made up of sailors, craftsmen, priests, ex-convicts and a knight, has just landed. Their objective is twofold: on the one hand, to set up a French colony on this far-off continent to compete with the Portuguese, on the other hand, to convert the Indigenous population to Christianity. Ill-prepared for the realities of the New World and torn apart by theological controversy (which sets the Catholics and Calvinists among them against one another), the French see their dreams of colonization gradually dissipate.

== See also ==
- 2001 in literature
- Contemporary French literature
