= Yasser (play) =

Yasser is a play by Moroccan-born Dutch novelist, playwright and journalist Abdelkader Benali. It was written in 2001, and describes the challenges and adversities faced by a Palestinian actor in playing the role of Shylock in Shakespeare's The Merchant of Venice.

== Plot ==
The play takes place in the dressing room of a provincial theatre in a European country, where character Yasser Mansour is getting ready to go and perform the role of Shylock in Shakespeare's The Merchant of Venice. While preparing for this role, he elaborates on his past in Palestine, his discrimination and the prejudices he faces as an Arab living and working in the West, and the insights into emancipation that performing the role of Shylock have given him.

== Production ==
Yasser is a monologue, taking place in continuous time. The play makes frequent reference to The Merchant of Venice, and on several occasions quotes passages of it, including the "Has not a Jew eyes" speech by Shylock in Shakespeare's original.

Yasser was written for production by De Toneelschuur theatre in Haarlem, the Netherlands, where it opened in September 2001. It won the H. G. van der Vies award for new writing, and was in the official selection for the annual Theaterfestival in 2002. An English production of Yasser, translated by Terry Ezra, opened at the Assembly Rooms on the 2008 Edinburgh Festival Fringe, in a production by Anglo-Dutch theatre company Studio Dubbelagent, where it received standing ovations. This production subsequently transferred to the Chopin Theatre, Chicago, in October and November 2008, and to Arcola Theatre, London in 2009.

In a review of the London production, The Jewish Chronicle stated: "It is hard to think of a metaphor that more powerfully illustrates that Jew and Arab are divided by a common history than the one offered by this one-man play."
