= Bitter Fruit =

2001 novel by Achmat Dangor

- Author: Achmat Dangor
- Published: 2001
- Pages: 254 pp.
- ISBN: 0-7957-0097-0
- OCLC: 868430318

Bitter Fruit is a novel by Achmat Dangor first published in 2001 by Kwela Books of Cape Town. Set in South Africa in 1998, it is about the disintegration of a Coloured family in the years after the end of apartheid. According to Gabriel Gbadamosi's review in The Guardian, "All the bases are touched in a reckoning with South Africa's past and present turmoil, and no box left unopened in the search for some kind of limbo or twilight zone where all unresolved conflicts might find resolution."

== Plot summary ==
Silas Ali is a Johannesburg lawyer approaching 50 who has risen to prominence during Nelson Mandela's presidency. A high-ranking civil servant occasionally even seen on television next to Mandela, he is employed as a liaison officer assigned to coordinate governmental activities with those of the Truth and Reconciliation Commission. While his attractive wife Lydia works as a nurse, their only child, 18-year-old Michael reads Literature at Wits University.

The past catches up with Silas Ali one Sunday morning at a shopping mall when he sees, and recognizes, François du Boise, an Afrikaner policeman who, in 1978, raped Lydia somewhere in the veld while Silas was made to listen to her screams from inside a police van—an act of brutality obviously triggered by Silas's involvement with the MK. For almost twenty years, Silas and Lydia have kept quiet about the crime, both to each other and towards the Truth and Reconciliation Commission, and Lydia has never shared her terrible suspicion that du Boise is Michael's natural father with anyone other than her secret diary. Trapped in an unpromising, sexless marriage, and more than ten years younger than her husband, Lydia copes badly with Silas's sudden revelation about du Boise and the additional information that the now retired policeman has applied for amnesty for a number of sexual assaults, including the one on her. In an act of self-injury, she dances on broken glass and has to be hospitalised under the pretence of having suffered a freak accident.

In the long run, however, all their attempts at keeping up appearances cannot disguise the fact that, for a multitude of reasons, their marriage is failing, and that they have also lost touch with their son, that they have no idea about where, and how, he is actually spending his time. They find out too late that, while performing brilliantly at university, he has turned into a seducer of older women—he has had affairs with one of his father's former "comrades in arms", who is rich, white, and bisexual, and also with one of his literature professors—and that he has started to investigate his own roots by contacting his paternal grandfather's relatives, who are Muslims (although his father Silas is not). Also, they do not realise that he has recently read Lydia's diary.

A birthday party thrown in Silas's honour is the last event where the Alis are seen together. By that time, Silas is toying with the idea of going abroad, preferably to Europe, to make a fresh start there, especially now that President Mandela is about to resign and he may lose his prestigious government job; Lydia has stopped working as a nurse and is planning to leave her husband for good; and Michael has acquired a gun and lets himself be influenced by fundamentalist Islamic circles.

In the end it is Michael Ali who takes the most drastic actions. Reinventing himself as a Muslim and planning to go into hiding and eventually to India, where his grandfather was born, he goes on a killing spree, shooting first the white father who for many years has had an incestuous relationship with his daughter—who is a friend of Michael's—, and then du Boise.

== Edition ==
- Achmat Dangor: Bitter Fruit (Atlantic Books: London, 2003; paperback edition 2004, ISBN 1-84354-264-1 ).
