= Jean-Christophe Rufin =

French writer

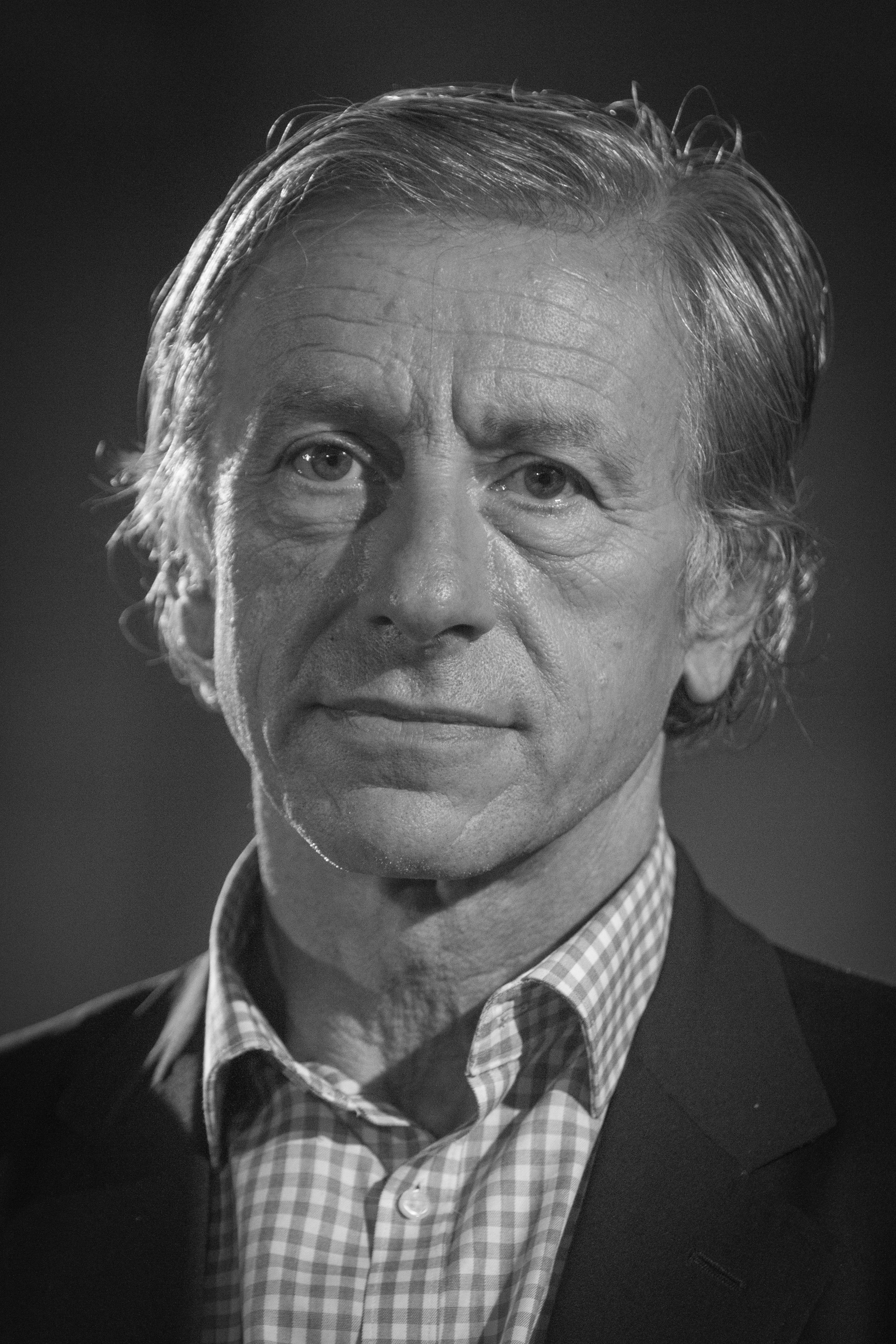
- Rufin in 2013
- Born: 28 June 1952 (age 74); Bourges, France
- Occupations: Diplomat; Physician; Writer
- Known for: Member of the Académie française

Jean-Christophe Rufin (French pronunciation: [ʒɑ̃ kʁistɔf ʁyfɛ̃]; born 28 June 1952) is a French doctor, diplomat, historian and novelist. He is the president of Action Against Hunger, one of the earliest members of Médecins Sans Frontières, and a member of the Académie française.

== Private and public life ==
=== Early life ===
Rufin was born in Bourges, Cher in 1952. An only child, he was raised by his grandparents as his father had left the family and his mother worked in Paris. His grandfather, a doctor and member of the French Resistance during World War II had been imprisoned for two years at Buchenwald.

In 1977, after medical school, Rufin went to Tunisia as a volunteer doctor. He led his first humanitarian mission in Eritrea, where he met Azeb, who became his second wife. he married Ingrid Glowacki at the Embassy of France in Tirana, Albania on 25 April 2025.

=== Career ===
==== Diplomacy ====
Rufin held a number of diplomatic posts. In 1989 he was cultural attaché in Brazil, and in 1993 he became a special adviser in strategic thinking on North-South relations to François Léotard, then Minister of Defence. In 2007, he was appointed French ambassador to Dakar.

==== Human rights activism ====
A graduate of the Institut d'études politiques de Paris (Sciences-Po), in 1986 he became advisor to the Secretary of State for Human Rights and published his first book, Le Piège humanitaire (The Humanitarian Trap), an essay on the political stakes of humanitarian action.

As a doctor, he is one of the pioneers of humanitarian movement "without borders," for which he has led numerous missions in eastern Africa and Latin America. A former vice-president of Médecins Sans Frontières and former president of the non-governmental organization Action Against Hunger.

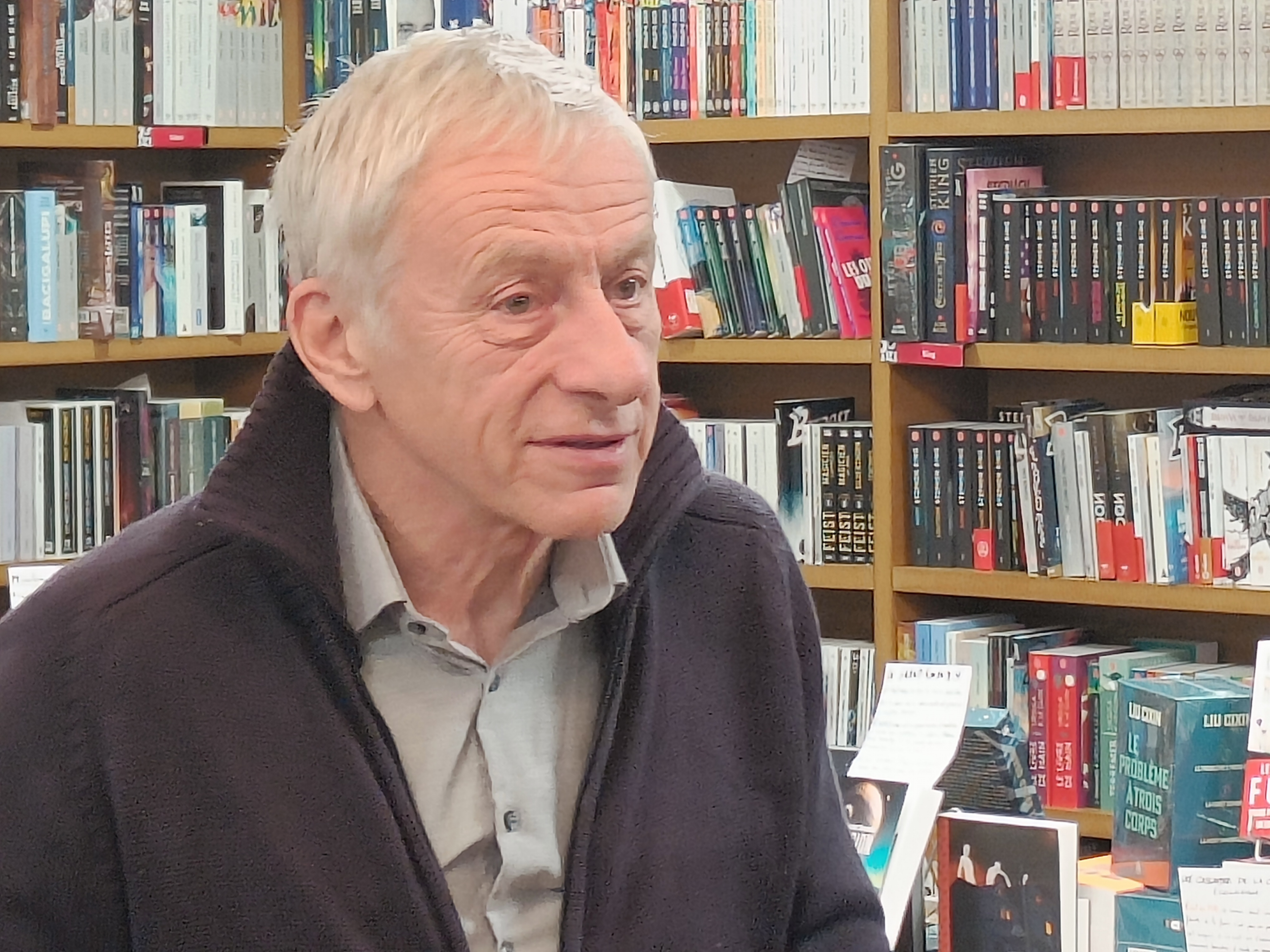
Jean-Christophe Rufin in Vincennes, December 2024

Dr. Jean-Christophe Rufin was appointed President of the Sanofi Espoir Corporate Foundation on 18 September 2020.

==== Report on racism and antisemitism ====
In 2003, Rufin was commissioned by French Interior Minister Dominique de Villepin to write an in-depth report on the upsurge of antisemitism in France. He presented the final report on 19 October 2004.

The "Rufin report" (as it later became known), as described by the US State Department, concluded the following:

- Racism and antisemitism were a threat to French democracy.
- Antisemitic acts are not only carried out by elements of the extreme right and youths of North African descent, but also by "disaffected individuals" whose antisemitic obsessions prompt their attacks against Jews and Jewish institutions.
- Radical anti-Zionists who question Israel's right to exist were dangerous.

The report, as described by the US State Department, recommended the following actions:

- That a law be created to punish those publicly equating Israel with apartheid or Nazi Germany.
- That the French press law of 1881, designed to guarantee freedom of the press, is too unwieldy to adequately address the issues of racism.
- That intolerance be countered in primary schools and by the education of new immigrants about the fight against racism and antisemitism.
- That an observation system to monitor racist and antisemitic websites be created and that it work closely with authorities to prosecute offenders.

The report was criticised by Michel Tubiana of the Ligue des droits de l'homme, who accused Rufin of "acting like an arsonist fireman." Tubiana said that the focus on antisemitism created an "imbalance" in the approach to fighting all racism, and that if the recommendation became law, the umbrella group of the International Federation for Human Rights would be punished because it viewed Israel's treatment of Israeli Arabs as "discriminatory".

== Selected bibliography ==
=== Essays ===
- L'aventure humanitaire ("The Humanitarian Adventure"), coll. "Découvertes Gallimard" (nº 226) (1994)
- La dictature libérale ("The Liberal Dictatorship") (1994)
- L'empire et les nouveaux barbares ("The Empire and the New Barbarians") (1991)
- Le piège humanitaire : quand l'humanitaire remplace la guerre ("The Humane Trap: when humanitarianism replaces war") (1986)

=== Novels ===
- 1997 The Abyssinian (1997) – winner of Prix Goncourt du Premier Roman and Prix Méditerranée
- 1998 The Siege of Isfahan
- 1999 Lost Causes / "Asmara et les causes perdues" (1999) – winner of prix Interallié
- 2001 Brazil Red (Rouge Brésil; 2001) – winner of prix Goncourt
- 2004 Globalia
- 2007 Le Parfum d'Adam
- 2010 Katiba
- 2011 Sept histoires qui reviennent de loin
- 2012 Le Grand Cœur
- 2014 The Red Collar (Le Collier rouge) – winner of prix Maurice Genevoix
- 2015 Check-point
- 2016 The Santiago Pilgrimage
- 2025 Un été avec Alexandre Dumas

=== Non-fiction books ===
- Économie des guerres civiles ("Economics of Civil Wars"), with Jean François (1996) ISBN 2-01-278788-6
- Mondes rebelles ("World Rebels"), with Arnaud de La Grange and Jean-Marc Balancie. (1996) ISBN 2-84186-142-2
