= Teunkie Van Der Sluijs =

Dutch-British theatre director and translator

Teunkie Van Der Sluijs is a Dutch-British theatre director, translator of plays, and playwright working predominantly in the United Kingdom and the Netherlands, and sporadically in the United States. Born in the Netherlands in 1981, Van Der Sluijs studied Drama at the University of Amsterdam before studying directing at London's Rose Bruford College and training at the National Film and Television School.

== United Kingdom ==
Since 2022 Van Der Sluijs has been Head of Artistic Development at London's Young Vic theatre. He was Creative Associate Director there before. Prior, he worked for HOME Theatre in Manchester and as a freelance director for venues including the Orange Tree Theatre, Arcola Theatre, Assembly Rooms Edinburgh and Battersea Arts Centre, and directed the 2012 Offie nominated revival of Michael Wall's Women Laughing in 2012. He adapted and directed Mathieu Kassovitz' film La Haine for the stage as HATE, playing the Netherlands and London's Barbican Theatre. He worked as a staff director at the Royal National Theatre, after working as resident assistant director at the Orange Tree Theatre under artistic director Sam Walters, where he also worked as associate director on Lars Noren's Autumn & Winter and directed the London premiere of Jon Fosse's Winter. He also directed work by Boris Vian at the Pleasance Theatre, by Robert Holman, and by Howard Barker.

Van der Sluijs made his UK debut in 2008 with Yasser by Abdelkader Benali, a production which transferred from the Edinburgh Festival Fringe to Chopin Theatre, Chicago, Arcola Theatre in London and the Royal Theatre in The Hague. The production was selected as Critic's Choice in both The Sunday Times ("Pick of the Fringe") and the Chicago Tribune, despite meeting with a mixed critical response. Whereas the Edinburgh Evening News praised its "sensitive direction" and trade paper The Stage wrote of it as "captivating and emotionally supple", The Chicago Sun-Times called it "a solid piece of acting, but not exactly a revelatory story." Van Der Sluijs went on to direct for Arcola Theatre's Grimeborn Festival, and was awarded an inaugural TS Eliot Exchange bursary between the Old Vic Theatre and the Public Theater New York City.

== Netherlands ==
Van Der Sluijs has directed for a range of venues and companies in the Netherlands, often directing Dutch language premieres of British and American plays. He directed the first Dutch production of Lorraine Hansberry's A Raisin in the Sun, for which production company Well Made Productions won the 2017 Amsterdam Award for the Arts, as well as its response play Beneatha's Place by Kwame Kwei-Armah for Stadsschouwburg Amsterdam. Other work includes the Dutch premiere production of The Mountaintop by Katori Hall, and Duncan Macmillan's Lungs, as well as Simon Stephens' Motortown. Original Dutch plays in his direction include Waterdragers for Het Zuidelijk Toneel and Ik Weet Van Geen Herinnering for Festival aan de Werf. He worked as resident director on ANNE, a new adaptation of Anne Frank's Diary of a Young Girl adapted by Leon de Winter and Jessica Durlacher for the purpose-built Theater Amsterdam. Earlier work includes productions at the Royal Theatre in The Hague, the home of the national theatre of the Netherlands, for the Compagnietheater - its temporary Amsterdam venue - and the Rozentheater, formerly Amsterdam's primary venue for theatre for young audiences.

Van der Sluijs has translated American and British plays for Dutch audiences, including Driving Miss Daisy by Alfred Uhry, The Mountaintop, Motortown and Lungs, as well as translating plays to English from Dutch. In a 2012 interview with Dutch daily newspaper Het Parool, Van Der Sluijs characterised the difference between the theatre cultures of The Netherlands and the UK as "In the Netherlands, the director is primary; in England, it's the playtext, followed by the actors." Prior to working as a theatre director, Van Der Sluijs appeared as an actor in the country's longest-running and highest-rating soap opera Goede tijden, slechte tijden in 2004.

== 2010 Times Square car bombing attempt ==
In May 2010, while in New York City to direct Omar El-Khairy's play Longitude at the Public Theater, Van Der Sluijs witnessed the failed terrorist attack on Times Square when on his way to a theatre performance on Broadway; his story subsequently appeared on BBC and in Dutch newspaper De Telegraaf.
