= Desperate Measures (film) =

- Theatrical release poster
- Directed by: Barbet Schroeder
- Written by: David Klass
- Based on: Desperate Measures by David Klass
- Produced by: Gary Foster; Barbet Schroeder; Lee Rich; Susan Hoffman
- Starring: Michael Keaton; Andy García; Brian Cox; Marcia Gay Harden
- Cinematography: Luciano Tovoli
- Edited by: Lee Percy
- Music by: Trevor Jones
- Production companies: TriStar Pictures; Mandalay Entertainment
- Distributed by: Sony Pictures Releasing
- Release date: January 30, 1998
- Running time: 100 minutes
- Country: United States
- Language: English
- Budget: $50 million
- Box office: $13.8 million

Desperate Measures is a 1998 American action thriller film starring Michael Keaton, Andy García, Marcia Gay Harden and Brian Cox, directed by Barbet Schroeder. It was filmed in both the San Francisco Bay Area and downtown Pittsburgh with such landmarks as the BNY Mellon Center, the Allegheny County Courthouse and the Oakland Bay Bridge. The film was released by Sony Pictures Releasing on January 30, 1998, and was a critical and financial failure, grossing $13.8 million against a $50 million budget. However, Andy García won an ALMA Award for "Outstanding Actor in a Feature Film in a Crossover Role".

== Plot ==
San Francisco police officer and widowed father Frank Conner is in a frantic search for a compatible bone marrow donor for his leukemia-stricken son, Matt. In desperation, he breaks into FBI headquarters and finds a perfect match. Unfortunately, it is Peter McCabe, a sociopath who is serving life in prison for several murders. During his time in prison, the brutal, cunning McCabe has attempted escape and killed several guards and fellow prisoners and must be kept in multiple restraints when outside of the supermax unit at Pelican Bay State Prison.

McCabe initially shows little interest in helping Conner, but later finds an opportunity to turn the situation to his advantage and devises a plot to escape. Biding his time, he plays chess against a computer, easily defeating the program, and expresses the need for a challenge akin to Garry Kasparov or Deep Blue. Meanwhile, Conner, along with police captain Cassidy and Matt's physician, Dr. Hawkins, prepare for McCabe to be transferred to the hospital for the organ transplant.

At the hospital, McCabe is given a sedative. With the aid of a counteracting drug he had obtained from a fellow inmate, McCabe slips out of his restraints, attacks the guards and surgeons and attempts to escape. Conner and a fellow officer corner him, but McCabe holds a scalpel to Hawkins' throat, prompting Conner to drop his gun. The other officer gets the drop on McCabe, but Hawkins warns the police that if he dies, his bone marrow becomes useless. Conner stands in the way of the other officer; McCabe takes his gun and shoots the officer.

After hearing what happened, Cassidy immediately orders Conner removed from the scene. Conner breaks free to search the hospital for McCabe on his own. McCabe causes an explosion with propane tanks, seizes control of the hospital's adjacent wing, holds guards hostage and orders a lockdown of the building.

Conner and Hawkins make their way to McCabe and convince him to let them inside so that Hawkins can attend to Matt. As McCabe watches Conner on the security cameras, he realizes that his nemesis is a truly devoted father and develops a grudging respect for him. Conner intervenes when McCabe is about to ambush Cassidy and his SWAT team with a set of tanks of cyclopropane. Cassidy is furious that Conner continues to aid an escaped convict, while McCabe is angry that Conner foiled his plan. He kidnaps Matt and descends to the sub-levels of the building.

Matt tries to wound McCabe to give Conner a better chance; impressed, McCabe spares Matt and leaves him at the hospital for Conner to find. McCabe then escapes into the city, where he steals a car. Conner chases McCabe to a bridge, still needing him captured alive. Cassidy and his men arrive in a helicopter and a sniper opens fire. Conner again shields McCabe and is wounded in the arm. McCabe attempts to flee, but Conner is determined not to let him go. Conner wounds McCabe, sending him off the bridge and into the bay. Conner then dives in and saves him.

Back in the hospital, a wounded McCabe agrees to the transplant, which saves Matt's life. Even though his career is over, Conner is overjoyed that Matt will live. McCabe is informed by a guard that the surgery went well. As the bed reclines upwards and McCabe looks at the guard menacingly, the guard suddenly realizes that his gun is missing. McCabe holds it over the guard and asks, "What kind of car do you have?"

== Cast ==
- Michael Keaton as Peter J. McCabe
- Andy García as Detective Frank Conner
- Brian Cox as Captain Jeremiah Cassidy
- Marcia Gay Harden as Dr. Samantha Hawkins
- Erik King as Detective Nate Oliver
- Efrain Figueroa as Detective Vargas
- Joseph Cross as Matthew Conner
- Janel Moloney as Sarah Davis
- Richard Riehle as Warden Ed Fayne
- Peter Weireter as SWAT Team Commander
- Steve Park as Dr. Gosha
- Donna Keegan as Donna, Burning Nurse
- Dennis Cockrum as Head Pelican Bay Guard
- Keith Diamond as Officer Derrick Wilson
- John Meier as Officer Rains, Cop Shot in ER
- Norman Howell as Officer Kellen, Burnt Cop 1
- John Rottger as Officer Trimble, Burnt Cop 2
- Tracey Walter as Medical Inmate
- Michael Shamus Wiles as Tough Inmate
- Danny Rogers as Motorcyclist

== Production ==
In May 1995, it was announced Desperate Measures from producers Lee Rich and Gary Foster had been set up at TriStar Pictures. Desperate Measures had been was shot from July through December 1996 and was initially intended as TriStar's main event release for the year, but due to restructuring at TriStar the release ended up being delayed. According to screenwriter David Klass, after the film began production director Barbet Schroeder had the script reworked by nine different writers whose work remained uncredited on the final film. Klass spoke of the final film with frustration as not only had the rewrites shifted the story from taking place in a small town to a major city, but also felt the film's depiction of childhood cancer patients as weak, frail, and pitiful was completely at odds with what he'd observed in his research at Los Angeles children's cancer wards and his attempt to respectfully depict the energy and optimism they'd displayed.

== Reception ==
On Rotten Tomatoes Desperate Measures has an approval rating of 19% based on reviews from 31 critics. The site's consensus states: "Times aren't desperate enough for this lame thriller to be called for." Audiences polled by CinemaScore gave the film an average grade of "B−" on an A+ to F scale.

Lisa Schwarzbaum of Entertainment Weekly wrote, "By the time Desperate Measures degenerates into an old-fashioned car chase, you may wish you were watching General Hospital. Although I suspect there is plenty of bone marrow and leukemia-related preposterousness here, my limited medical education precludes me from informed eyeball-rolling. I may not be a doctor, but I know a movie with iron-poor blood when I see one." Online film critic James Berardinelli stated, "when you consider how many contrivances the characters have to endure to reach the ending, you may think that the title has more to do with the film makers' approach than with anything that happens on screen."

== Awards ==
ALMA Awards (1999)

- Won, "Outstanding Actor in a Feature Film in a Crossover Role" - Andy Garcia

== Remake ==
This film was remade in Hindi by the title Jung starring Sanjay Dutt.
