= The Caretaker Trilogy =

The Caretaker Trilogy is a series of science fiction thrillers with an ecological theme, written for young adults by David Klass. The first book in the series, Firestorm (2006), was the first book ever endorsed by Greenpeace and was praised by critics for its combination of entertainment value and environmental message, garnering an American Library Association (ALA) Best Book citation, a starred review from Publishers Weekly, and a favorable review by the New York Times Book Review. The story focuses on Jack Danielson, a teenager sent back from the future to save the world's oceans. Whirlwind, the second book in the Caretaker Trilogy, tells the story of Jack's efforts to save the Amazon rainforest; published in March 2008 by Farrar, Straus and Giroux. The third book in the trilogy is Timelock, published in 2009.

Firestorm has been optioned by Warner Bros. and the production company Thunder Road.

Firestorm in hardback

Whirlwind in hardback

Timelock in hardback

== Novels ==
=== Firestorm ===
Gradually Jack learns that he is from 1000 years in the future, when the Earth is an ecological wasteland. His true parents are among the Caretakers, who live in that future, and he has been sent back to the present, to the Turning Point, the last opportunity to stop the environmental disasters that the Dark Army has set in play in order to ruin the world. With the help of an unusual dog and a shape-shifting female fighter.

Jack faces the diabolical Dargon, sent back from the future by the Dark Army with plans to trigger the ruin of the world's oceans.

=== Whirlwind ===
The sequel to Firestorm. Jack is accused of kidnapping PJ but is quickly found by Gisco as they set off on their second adventure. They have a wild run in at a carnival, a hot air balloon ride, and a full out war with the leader of the Dark Army, the father of his previous enemy. This time around instead of the ocean it is the Amazon which makes most of the Earth's air. In the rain forest Jack finds Eko and after some romantic scenes they find Kidah, a mysterious wizard lost in time, also the wizard who wrote the prophecy about Jack. After another successful mission Jack promises to give up on the future's battle with the dark army and throws the watch into the Amazon River.

=== Timelock ===
Although longing for a normal life, in the final novel of the trilogy Jack has to save the polar ice caps. He visits his own time, a world of burning deserts, and has to choose between his destiny as a prince of the future and his life as an ordinary present-day teenager. He battles cyborgs, giant scorpions and zombie warlocks.
