= Van der Sluijs =

Van der Sluijs is a Dutch surname. Meaning "from the locks / sluice" it could have a toponymic origin or could be a metonymic occupational surname (the lock keeper). Alternative spellings are Van der Sluys, Van der Sluis, and Van der Slice while some or all compounds can be concatenated and capitalized outside the Netherlands. Notable people with the surname include:

Van der Sluijs

- Dannij van der Sluijs (born 1963), Dutch politician
- Dingeman van der Sluijs (1947–2024), known as Dick Diamonde, Dutch-Australian musician
- Ferenc E. van der Sluijs (born 1970s), stage name I-F, Dutch DJ
- Teunkie van der Sluijs (born 1981), Dutch theatre director working in the UK as Teunkie Van Der Sluijs
- Coen van der Sluijs (born 1978 te Roermond), Regisseur Dutch Television, 1 AD and Producer working in The Netherlands

Van der Sluis

- Jan van der Sluis (1889–1952), Dutch footballer
- Mary Meyer-van der Sluis (1917–1994), Dutch fencer

Van der Sluys

- Cornelis van der Sluys (1883–1944), Dutch artist and designer
- Dean van der Sluys (born 1995), Dutch footballer
- Harry van der Sluys (1891–1954), known as Roy Rene, Australian comedian
- Stan Vandersluys (1924–2005), Australian rules footballer
- Wilhelm van der Sluys (born 1991), South African rugby union player

Van der Slice

- John Vanderslice (born 1967), American musician and songwriter
