= Wiersema =

Wiersema is a surname. Notable people with the surname include:

- John Wiersema (1955–2018), Canadian civil servant
- Robert Wiersema (born 1970), Canadian writer

== See also ==
- Wiersma
