= Jean-François =

Jean-François (French pronunciation: [ʒɑ̃ fʁɑ̃swa]) is a French given name. Notable people bearing the given name include:

- Jean-François Arsenault, Canadian politician in Quebec
- Jean-François Carenco (born 1952), French politician
- Jean-François Champollion (1790–1832), French Egyptologist
- Jean-François Clervoy (born 1958), French engineer and astronaut
- Jean-François Corminboeuf (born 1953), Swiss sport sailor
- Jean-François Coulomme (born 1966), French politician
- Jean-François Dagenais (born 1975), Canadian music producer
- Jean-François David (born 1982), Canadian ice hockey player
- Jean-François Gariépy (born 1984), Canadian alt-right political commentator and former neuroscientist
- Jean-François Garreaud (1946–2020), French actor
- Jean-François de La Harpe (1739–1803), French critic
- Jean-François Hernandez (born 1969), French football player
- Jean-François Larose (born 1972), Canadian politician
- Jean-François Lyotard (1924–1998), French philosopher
- Jean-François Marceau (born 1976), Canadian judoka
- Jean-François Marmontel (1723–1799), French historian and writer
- Jean-François Martial (1891–1977), Belgian actor
- Jean-François Mayer (born 1957), Swiss historian of religion
- Jean-François Mertens (1946-2012), Belgian mathematical economist
- Jean-François Millet (1814–1875), French painter
- Jean-François Ndongou (born 1960), Gabonese politician
- Jean-François Papillon (died 1805), Haitian revolutionary
- Jean-François Parigi (born 1960), French politician
- Jean-François Picheral (1934–2024), French politician
- Jean-François Racine (born 1982), Canadian ice hockey player
- Jean-François Rewbell (1747–1807), French politician
- Jean-François Ricard (born 1956), French prosecutor of the National Terrorism Prosecution Office for the prosecution of terrorism in France
- Jean-François Rousset (born 1952), French politician
- Jean-François Séguier (1703–1784), French astronomer and botanist

== See also ==
- Jean-François, comte de Durat (1736–1830), French noble and military officer
- Jean L. François (1882–1941), French philatelist
- Jean-François, blue rabbit-cat hybrid from the TV series Bunny Maloney
