= You Don't Know Me (novel) =

Book by David Klass

- Author: David Klass
- Language: English
- Subject: Abuse
- Genre: Young adult fiction, coming-of-age novel
- Publisher: Farrar, Straus & Giroux
- Publication date: March 28, 2001
- Publication place: United States
- Pages: 272 pp (first edition hardcover)
- ISBN: 0-374-38706-0 (first edition hardcover)

You Don't Know Me is a coming-of-age novel by David Klass which tells the tale of a teenage boy who is abused and faces pressure in his school. It was first published in 2001.

== Plot summary ==
John is a fourteen-year-old boy. He lives with his mother and his mother's boyfriend, Stan, who he calls the "Man Who is Not my Father". His real father left the home when John was young. Stan abuses John by assaulting him when nobody is around.

As well as his family life, much of the book explores John's struggles to fit in at school and his relationship with his closest friend, whom John calls "Billy Beezer" because of his long nose. John is presented as a social outsider, his one interest being playing the tuba, which he was forced into when asked to choose an extra-curricular activity, but he has a crush on a very popular girl named Gloria, whom he calls "Glory Hallelujah". Billy also has a crush on Gloria.

Billy Beezer is arrested for stealing an egg roll from a Chinese restaurant in the food court of a mall. With Billy out of the picture, John sees this as an opportunity to ask Gloria out, which he does the following day. She accepts and goes to a basketball game with him. Billy also attends the game and calls John a terrible friend. A riot breaks out in the gym and John and Gloria escape. Gloria brings John home and seduces him until John escapes from her and her angry father, but leaves clothes and money which he took from his stepfather Stan's bedroom drawer. Stan finds out and takes John to do some "business" as a way of paying back the money. John is forced to carry TVs into a truck and realizes that Stan is handling stolen goods, which is how he affords the brand-new TV in their home despite not working. Stan tells John that he and John's mother are getting married.

In school, Gloria humiliates John, Billy picks on him and he is in trouble for vocalizing a rude thought about a teacher out loud and making her cry. Soon John is asked to dance by a girl in the school orchestra named Violet, who he had previously nicknamed "Violent" because of her bad saxophone playing. He goes with her, then to her house, where her parents are much kinder than Gloria's. Violet stands up for John against Gloria and her new jock boyfriend. When John goes home, Stan is drunk and assaults John, but this time he fights back. Stan gets the better of the fight and beats John senseless. He is saved by his music teacher, Mr. Steenwilly, who had suspected John was being emotionally abused due to his negative attitude in orchestra and came to check upon him.

John wakes up in hospital surrounded by his friends and mother. His mother wishes he had told her about Stan's abusive behaviour before, and says that she loves him. John finally feels that his mother really knows him, because she decides to leave Stan.

John attends the orchestra's end-of-year concert as a spectator (Stan punched him in the mouth, leaving him unable to play the tuba), where he cries at the end of a piece of music, because he finally figures out that it is a love story. Violet plays well during the piece and it is suggested that John is in love with her.

== Reception ==
The New York Times said the book was a mixture between Stephen King's novel Misery and The Catcher in the Rye's main character Holden Caulfield. On the other hand, the Lodi News-Sentinel hoped that abused youth would be persuaded to look for help after reading this book. The Washington Post said overall You Don't Know Me was " a fast-paced, completely readable book".
