= Jean L. François =

French philatelist (1882-1941)

Jean Louis François (2 November 1882 – 10 January 1941) was a French philatelist who signed the Roll of Distinguished Philatelists in 1935. He contributed to the Kohl Briefmarken-Handbuch and was one of the founder members of the Académie de philatélie.
