= Gallows Thief =

2001 novel

- First edition
- Author: Bernard Cornwell
- Language: English
- Genre: Historical mystery
- Publisher: HarperCollins
- Publication date: 1 Oct 2001
- Publication place: United Kingdom
- Media type: Print (hardback & paperback)
- Pages: 384 pp (first edition, hardback)
- ISBN: 978-0-00-712715-3 (first edition, hardback)
- OCLC: 47192973

Gallows Thief (2001) is a historical mystery novel by Bernard Cornwell set in London, England in the year 1817, which uses capital punishment as its backdrop. The story concerns an amateur investigator hired to rubber-stamp the death sentence of a condemned murderer. Instead, he discovers a conspiracy to conceal the real killer.

== Plot ==
Retired Captain Rider Sandman is summoned to the office of the Home Secretary, Lord Sidmouth. A portrait artist named Charles Corday has been sentenced to death for the murder of the Countess of Avebury and Corday's mother has petitioned for his pardon. Lord Sidmouth makes it clear that he has no doubts that Corday is guilty, and regards Sandman's job as an empty formality. His task is simple: to visit Corday and obtain a confession.

The Countess's husband, the Earl of Avebury, commissioned a boudoir painting of his wife. The Countess was sitting for Corday in her London house when she was brutally stabbed to death, and her clothes were torn off, suggesting that she had been raped. Corday's palette knife was found on her body. The Countess's maid, Meg, was in attendance, but did not appear at his trial.

Sandman discovers that it was not the Earl who commissioned the portrait of the Countess, but instead a men's club in London, the Seraphim Club. At the club's premises, Sandman is met by the young Marquess of Skavadale, who claims to have no idea what Sandman is talking about. Sam Berrigan, an ex-army sergeant who is now the Club doorman, tells Sandman that the Seraphim Club is made up of young, aristocratic rakes who commit crimes just for the fun of it. Sandman develops a theory that one of the Seraphim Club killed the Countess.

Christopher Carne, the Earl of Avebury's son, supports the theory that his father did the murder. His father, he confides, hates him because Christopher's grandfather decided to pass over his son and entail his estate onto Christopher, meaning he will inherit a vast fortune when his father dies, while his father is merely living off the income. The Earl himself insists he did not kill his wife, and does not know who did, but he hated her all the same. She spent all his money, and was unfaithful to him, so he turned her out of the house and ordered her allowance cut off. She laughed it off, telling him she was supplementing her income through blackmail of her various lovers.

Sandman's one-time fiancé, Eleanor Forrest, tells him that her maid saw Meg taken away from the house in a coach belonging to the Seraphim Club. When Sandman mentions Skavadale, Eleanor excitedly tells him that Skavadale's family is close to bankruptcy, but, as the heir to a dukedom, he has managed to become engaged to the wealthiest heiress in England. To both of them, it seems obvious: Skavadale was one of the Countess's many lovers, and he killed her when she attempted to blackmail him and likely killed Meg.

Sandman and Berrigan travel to Skavadale's estate and find Meg, still alive. In the presence of the Home Secretary, Meg confesses: Lord Christopher is the killer. His own stepmother seduced him and then blackmailed him, with her eye on the earldom's vast fortune. He came to the house, begging her to return his love letters; she mocked him, and he lost control and stabbed her with his pocketknife. Meg discovered him, as did Skavadale when he arrived shortly thereafter. Lord Sidmouth writes a hasty pardon while ordering horses and a police escort to speed Sandman to Newgate. Sandman arrives just in time to save Corday, while his police escort seizes Lord Christopher.

== Major themes ==
In his Historical Note, Cornwell says the primary inspiration for the story was V.A.C. Gatrell's book, "The Hanging Tree," a work of history on capital punishment in late 18th and 19th century England. Gatrell's book noted that the French guillotine, while more grisly in effect, was a swifter and less painful means of death, yet the English refused to adopt it, because of its association with the anarchic mob justice practised during the French Revolution. Because death was not instantaneous, many condemned criminals survived hanging, if they were cut down prematurely. Obadiah Hakeswill, a villain in Cornwell's Sharpe novels, was such a survivor and the experience convinced him that he was invincible.
