= David Klass =

American writer

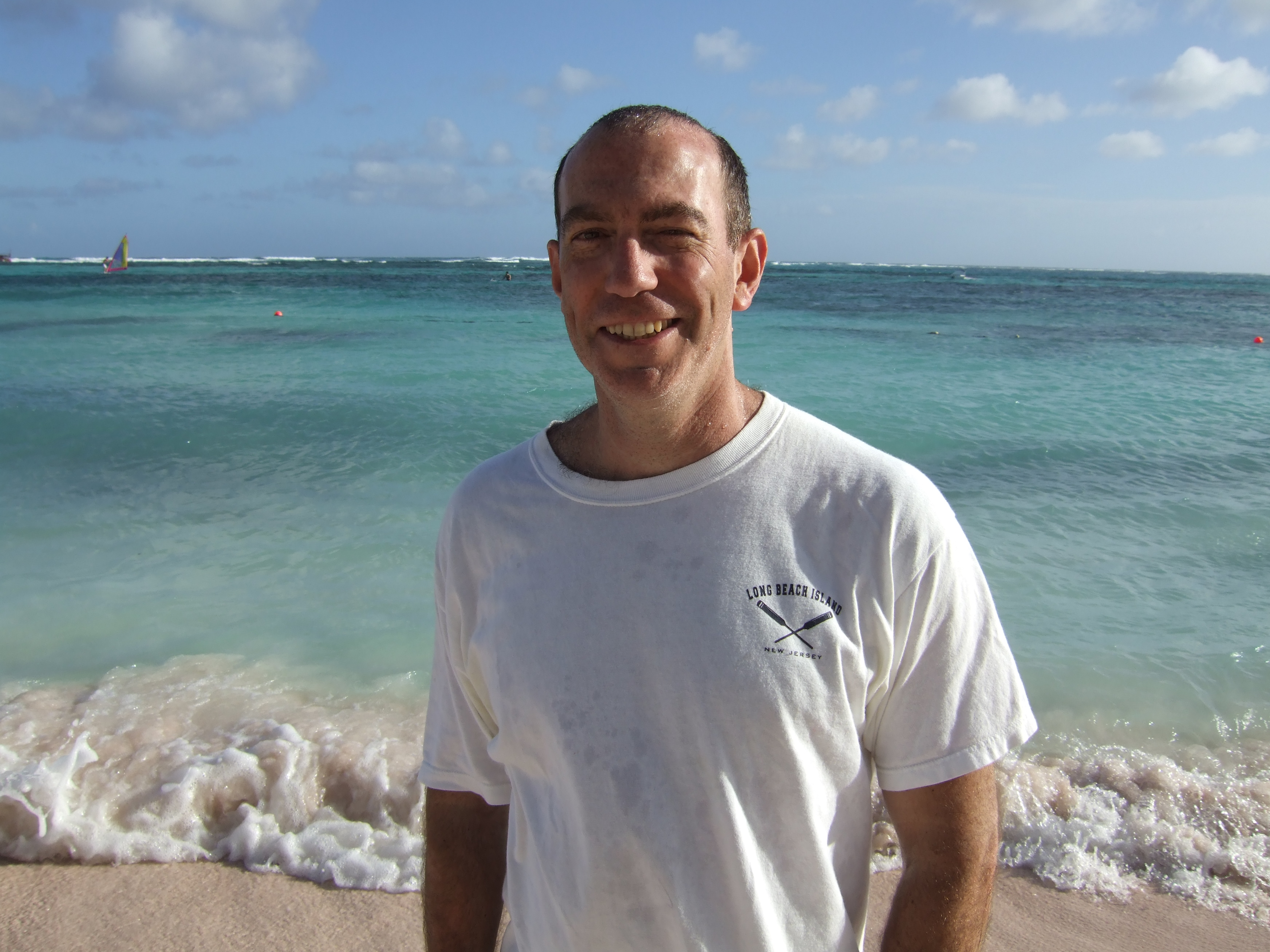
- Born: Vermont, United States
- Education: Leonia High School; Yale University (BA); USC School of Cinematic Arts
- Occupations: Novelist, screenwriter
- Writing career
- Genres: Screenwriting, thrillers, young adult fiction

David Klass is an American screenwriter and novelist. He has written more than 40 screenplays for Hollywood studios and published 14 young adult novels. His screenplays are primarily character-based thrillers for adults, while his novels often tell the stories of teenagers in crisis.

== Biography ==
Klass was born in Vermont and raised in Leonia, New Jersey, the son of Sheila Solomon Klass, English professor and author, and Morton Klass, professor of anthropology at Barnard College and the brother of Perri Klass, a pediatrician, author, educator, and a contributing columnist for The New York Times. His uncle was science fiction author Philip Klass, who wrote under the name William Tenn.

Klass attended Leonia High School. He received his BA in history from Yale University in 1982 and later graduated from USC School of Cinema-Television (1989). Klass lives in New York City with his wife, Giselle Benatar, and their two children.

== Novels ==
Klass's writing career began with the novel The Atami Dragons, inspired by his experiences as an English teacher in Japan. His 1994 book California Blue gathered very positive reviews for its quiet yet compelling treatment of environmental issues. In 2001 Klass published You don’t know me, which uses an edgy first-person narrative to tell the story of a teenage boy's life with an abusive stepfather-to-be. The book has been published in 18 languages, was named an ALA Best Book For Young Adults, and continues to be popular with young adult audiences in the United States and internationally.

Firestorm is the first book of the Caretaker Trilogy, a series of science fiction thrillers with an ecological theme. Firestorm was the first book ever endorsed by Greenpeace and was praised by critics for its combination of entertainment value and environmental message, garnering an American Library Association (ALA) Best Book citation, a starred review from Publishers Weekly, and a favorable review by The New York Times Book Review. The story focuses on Jack Danielson, a teenager sent back from the future to save the world's oceans.

Whirlwind, the second book in the Caretaker Trilogy, tells the story of Jack's efforts to save the Amazon rain forest; published in March 2008 by Farrar, Straus and Giroux. The third book in the trilogy is Timelock, published in fall 2009.

Firestorm has been optioned by Warner Bros. and the production company Thunder Road. A screenplay for the movie version is now in active development.

Out of Time is an adult novel about a talented young FBI agent in pursuit of an ecoterrorist.<Tom Nolan, Wall Street Journal, July 11, 2020 >

== Screenplays ==
Klass has also written more than 40 Hollywood screenplays, including the adaptation of James Patterson's Kiss the Girls for the movie version starring Morgan Freeman and Ashley Judd. His most recent produced screenplay was the remake of Walking Tall starring The Rock. Klass wrote the screenplay for the thriller Desperate Measures starring Michael Keaton and Andy García, which was based on his original idea. With his sister, playwright and Truman Scholar Judy Klass, he adapted Julia Alvarez's novel In the Time of the Butterflies into the 2001 movie starring Salma Hayek and Edward James Olmos.

== Bibliography ==
- The Atami Dragons (1984)
- Breakaway Run (1987)
- Different Season (1988)
- Wrestling With Honor (1989)
- Night of the Tyger (1990)
- Samurai, Inc. (1992)
- California Blue (1994)
- Danger Zone(1996)
- Screen Test (1997)
- Desperate Measures (1998) (with Robert Tine)
- You Don't Know Me (2001)
- Home of the Braves (2002)
- Dark Angel (2005)
- The Caretaker Trilogy

1. Firestorm (2006)
2. Whirlwind (2008)
3. Timelock (2009)

- Stuck on Earth (2010)
- Second Impact (2013), with Perri Klass
- Grandmaster (2014)
- Losers Take All (2015)
- Out of Time (July 7, 2020)

== Filmography ==
- Kiss the Girls (1997)
- Desperate Measures (1998)
- Runaway Virus (2000)
- In the Time of the Butterflies (2001)
- Walking Tall (2004)
