= Gerben Moerman =

Dutch sociologist

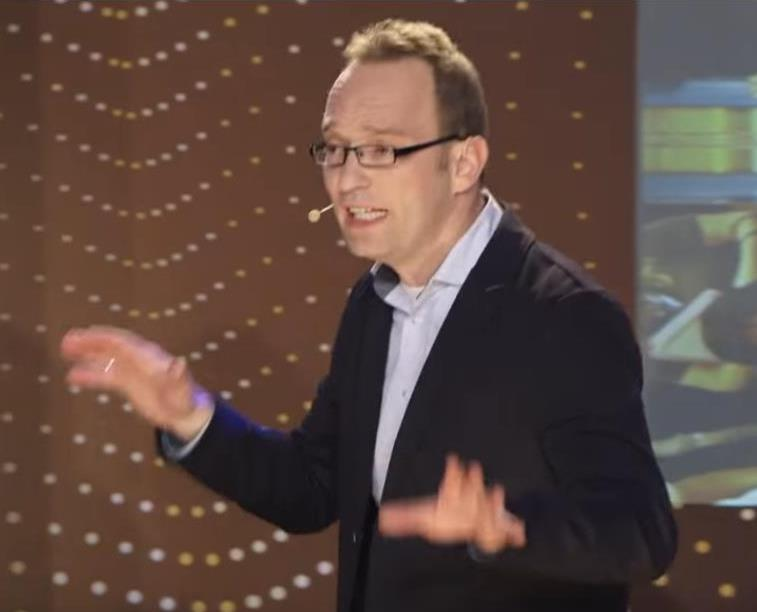
Gerben Moerman (2014)

Gerben Albert (Gerben) Moerman (Schipluiden, 1976) is a Dutch sociologist and senior lecturer at the University of Amsterdam (UvA). He currently serves as Programme Director of the Research Masters in Sociology. His area of expertise includes social research methodology, qualitative research methods, mixed methods, collaborative interpretation, interviewing techniques, qualitative data analysis and participatory research. He is member of the UvA group for Dynamics of Citizenship and Culture. He is considered something of an expert on breaching, and has drawn attention for a hobby of his—the Paul is dead conspiracy theory. In 2012, he was chosen as UvA teacher of the year; he was praised for being able to interest his students in the unpopular subject of social research methodology, and for linking theory to society and continually surprising his students.

== Publicatie ==
- Gerben Albert Moerman: Probing behaviour in open interviews. A field experiment on the effects of probing tactics on quality and content of the received information. Dissertation Vrije Universiteit Amsterdam, 2010.
