= Crawling at Night =

2001 novel by Nani Power

- First edition
- Author: Nani Power
- Language: English
- Genre: Fiction
- Published: 2001 (Atlantic Monthly Press)
- Publication place: USA
- Media type: Print (Paperback)
- Pages: 234
- ISBN: 9780871137845
- OCLC: 611408139

Crawling at Night is a 2001 novel by Nani Power. It follows the lives, over two nights, of Ito, a sushi chef, and Marianne, a waitress in downtown Manhattan.

== Reception ==
Dwight Garner, in a review for The New York Times, wrote "Power can go overboard on the grungy poetics ... and she clutters up her story with the kind of fripperies ... that felt dated 5 or 10 years ago." but also called Crawling at Night "the work of a formidable young writer" and compared Power's writing to Mary Gaitskill and Denis Johnson. A Guardian review wrote "Power's writing is stellar, her sentences popping like fireworks into gorgeous explosions of evocation, visceral, crisp and unexpected. A man with her talent might use it to call attention to his skilfulness, but Power's pyrotechnics never takes you outside the story."

Crawling at Night has also been reviewed by Publishers Weekly, Kirkus Reviews,

It was nominated for a 2001 Los Angeles Times Book Prize, was a 2001 New York Times notable book, and appeared on the Orange Award longlist.
