= Ways of Hearing =

2001 non-fiction book by Ben Thompson

- Author: Ben Thompson
- Genre: Non-fiction
- Publication date: 2001
- ISBN: 0 575 06809 4

Ways of Hearing (ISBN 0 575 06809 4) is a 2001 book about pop music by Ben Thompson. The book, subtitled "A user's guide to the pop psyche, from Elvis to Eminem", describes how Western pop music intersects with films, videos, television shows, and fiction. The book includes short essays on several performers, including alternative rocker Blixa Bargeld, contemporary composer John Cale, Captain Beefheart, The Chemical Brothers, hip-hop artists Missy Elliott and Eminem, Montreal avant-garde band Godspeed You Black Emperor!, heavy metal singer-bassist Lemmy, Meatloaf (singer), Rolling Stones guitarist Cliff Richard, Pet Shop Boys and country rockers Wilco. The last section of the book describes different subgenres of pop, including metal, psychedelic, and political rock.

== Reception ==
According to the reviewer at The Guardian, "His critical ear is almost infallibly trustworthy; his writing, which both dances round the point and then gets straight to it, is a delight." The Birmingham Post says, "Although at times the book has the feel of a 'greatest hits' collection of Thompson's previous work for The Daily Telegraph, Evening Standard and Mojo, the sheer breadth of his critical reference points makes for an exhilarating read for anyone who truly cares about pop." Financial Times compares Ways of Hearing to Psychotic Reactions and Carburetor Dung by Lester Bangs and says, "Thompson's book, notionally about pop's transformative power, doesn't have the same intensity of purpose: funny and clever, it treats the music as a playground rather than a battlefield."
