= Achmat Dangor =

South African writer (1948–2020)

- Born: 2 October 1948; Johannesburg, Union of South Africa
- Died: 6 September 2020 (aged 71)
- Occupations: Writer, poet

Achmat Dangor (2 October 1948 – 6 September 2020) was a South African writer, poet, and development professional. His most important works include the novels Kafka's Curse (1997) and Bitter Fruit (2001). He was also the author of three collections of poetry, a novella, and a short story collection.

Dangor was born in Johannesburg, Union of South Africa. He was one of the founding members of the Congress of South African Writers, and headed up various non-governmental organisations in South Africa, including the Nelson Mandela Children's Fund, the Nelson Mandela Foundation and was the Southern Africa Representative for the Ford Foundation. In 2015, he was given a Lifetime Achievement Award by the South African Literary Awards (SALA). He lived in Johannesburg, South Africa, with his wife, Audrey, and young son Zachary, and devoted his time to his writing.

== Awards ==
His awards included:

- 1998 Herman Charles Bosman Prize for Kafka's Curse
- Bitter Fruit was shortlisted for the 2004 Booker Prize.

== Notable works ==
- Waiting for Leila (1981)
- Voices from Within (1982)
- Bulldozer (1983)
- Majiet (1986)
- The Z Town trilogy (1990)
- Private Voices (1992)
- Kafka’s Curse (1997)
- Bitter Fruit (2003)
- Strange Pilgrimages (2013)
- Dikeledi: Child of Tears, No More (2017)

== Family ==
Dangor is the brother of Jessie Duarte.
