= Jason Sommer =

American poet and academic

- Education: Brandeis University; Stanford University; Saint Louis University
- Occupations: Poet; academic
- Writing career
- Notable awards: Whiting Award (2001)

Jason Sommer is an American poet and academic.

== Life ==
He graduated from Brandeis University, Stanford University (where he held the Mirrielees Fellowship in Poetry), and Saint Louis University. He taught at Saint Louis University, Webster University, and University College, Dublin.

His work appeared in AGNI, The New Republic, Ploughshares, TriQuarterly.

He taught at Fontbonne University from 1985 to 2015, where he also held the distinction of Poet in Residence.

== Awards ==
- National Endowment for the Humanities grant
- 2001 Whiting Award

== Works ==
- "The Ballad of Fighting With My Father". Ploughshares. Spring 1984. Archived from the original on 29 March 2005.
- Lifting the Stone. Forest Books. 1 January 1991. ISBN 978-0-948259-94-4.
- Other People's Troubles. University of Chicago Press. 1997. ISBN 978-0-226-76816-8.
- The Man Who Sleeps in My Office. University of Chicago Press. 2004. ISBN 978-0-226-76805-2.
- The Laughter of Adam and Eve. Southern Illinois University Press. 2013. ISBN 978-0809332786.
- Portulans. University of Chicago Press. 2021. ISBN 978-0226737393.
- Shmuel's Bridge: Following the Tracks to Auschwitz with My Survivor Father. Imagine. 2022. ISBN 978-1-62354-512-3.

=== Translations ===
- Wang Xiaobo (2007). Wang in Love and Bondage: Three Novellas. Translators Jason Sommer, Hongling Zhang. SUNY Press. ISBN 978-0-7914-7065-7.
- Tie Ning (2014). The Bathing Women. Translators Hongling Zhang, Jason Sommer. Scribner. ISBN 9781476704258.

=== Anthologies ===
- Michael Collier, ed. (2000). The New American Poets. UPNE. ISBN 978-0-87451-964-8.
