= How I Came into My Inheritance =

How I Came Into My Inheritance and Other True Stories
- Editor: Dorothy Gallagher
- Language: English
- Subject: Non-fiction, Biography
- Published: 2001 (Random House)
- Publication place: United States
- Media type: Print (hardback, paperback)
- Pages: 187
- ISBN: 9780375503467
- OCLC: 906864124

How I Came Into My Inheritance and Other True Stories is a 2001 book by Dorothy Gallagher. It is a collection of stories about Gallagher's family in Ukraine and New York City.

== Reception ==
The New York Times, in its review of How I Came Into My Inheritance, wrote "Gallagher's most humane talent is her ability to resurrect her dead, to restore ancient relatives to vibrant youth." and concluded "Gallagher's uncompromising presentation of both the beautiful and the abhorrent aspects of their lives has a cumulative effect. Readers who relish the truth -- served straight up, 120 proof -- will be intoxicated by her book and will accept her inheritance as their own."

How I Came Into My Inheritance has also been reviewed by Publishers Weekly, January Magazine, Kirkus Reviews, The New York Review of Books, the Los Angeles Times, and The Washington Post.
