= Middle Age: A Romance =

2001 novel by Joyce Carol Oates

- First edition cover
- Author: Joyce Carol Oates
- Language: English
- Genre: Romance novel
- Publisher: Ecco/HarperCollins
- Publication date: September 4, 2001
- Publication place: United States
- Media type: Print (hardback & paperback)
- Pages: 560 pp
- ISBN: 0-06-620946-3
- OCLC: 45879731
- Dewey Decimal: 813/.54 21
- LC Class: PS3565.A8 M45 2001

Middle Age: A Romance is a 2001 novel by Joyce Carol Oates.

== Plot ==
Adam Berendt, a cryptic yet charismatic sculptor, dies. The novel expounds the peculiar relationships that he had with the other women in the neighbourhood.

In Salthill-on-Hudson, a New York City suburb for the wealthy and middle-aged, Adam Berendt, a charismatic sculptor, drowns in a river as he tries to rescue children on a Fourth of July cookout.

Before his cremation, we learn that Marina Troy, owner of a small book store, was infatuated with him. Over the years he had bought many books from her shop to support her financially, and lately he had bequeathed to her a house of his in the mountains. Roger Cavanagh, Adam's lawyer, forges his will and Marina agrees to sign it, hence making it legal. Camille Hoffmann, married to Lionel, had an affair with Adam. She is described as an innocent girl, rescued by Lionel from a frat rape years back. At Adam's cremation, she breaks down, and back at their house it is clear that their marriage is rocky. After eerily dreaming of Adam, his dog Apollo crops up in their kitchen.

At the same time, Abigail Des Pres, another suburban, stalks her teenaged son Jared Tierney, then invites him for dinner in her hotel room. Jared, an angry teenager, appears to be worried about Apollo. It is learnt that her ex-husband, Harry Tierney, is a fiercely mean man. Abigail and her son get into a car accident as she drives him back to his campus. Simultaneously, Roger Cavanagh attends his teenaged daughter Robin's hockey match after running late. Abigail then summons him because of the accident; Jared is spiteful. Roger and Abigail flirt, only to be interrupted by Apollo. Then Roger has dinner with his aggressive daughter; they spend the night at a motel. The next day she taunts him, pretending to be pregnant and confessing that was in jest. A few days later, Roger calls Abigail and finds out that she is away for the summer.

A little later, Augusta Cutler, another suburban, goes to the rescued child's house and makes a fuss as she, too, was in love with Adam. She decides to leave her husband Owen, since he never seems to pay attention to her.

During this time, Marina Troy leaves for Demascus County, to live in her inherited house - she lives there on her own, without even a telephone line. She has arranged for her house to be let, and for Molly Ivers, a dynamic librarian, to take charge of the book shop while she is away. Marina, however, isn't totally alone as Beverly Hogan, a pushy estate agent, starts to pester her with impromptu visits. Marina is also acquainted with Rick Pryde, a petrol station owner, maimed in the Persian Gulf War of 1991, who does snow-ploughing in winter as well. Next Marina goes to a mall and rescues a girl from an abusive boyfriend in the carpark. The girl concisely says her name is Lorene; they stop at a diner and the girl eventually leaves with her boyfriend. That night Marina dreams of Adam's unfinished sculptures that she has been tampering with, and realizes she is deluded.

Then there is a shift to the Hoffmanns, and we learn of Lionel's mistress, Siri Joio, an Asian massage artist. Meanwhile, Camille rescues a maimed stray dog and gets him operated, although that would seem like a folly. Then Lionel leaves Camille to live with Siri, and Camille sinks into depression; their grown children are angry with their father. A little later, Beatrice Archer, a neighbour, visits Camille. At the same time, Roger Cavanagh tells Lionel Hoffmann he will soon be a father for the second time.

Camille somehow ends up with three more dogs (one of which belongs to a rich neighbour, Mrs Ferris, and another to a relative of Beatrice Archer's). Lionel then calls to say he is coming home. Meanwhile, Abigail Des Pres finds herself stalking an Asian-American girl with a 'red beret'. After a girlish meal, Abigail attends a dinner party for the Historic Society, and there an architect, Gerhardt Ault, hits on her, then calls her again the next day. Abigail prefers to call her ex-husband and ask about her son, who has refused to talk to her since the accident. She then has dinner with Gerhardt, but ends up walking out in sobs and eventually ignoring his calls. A little later she gets her book signed by Pulitzer-winner poet Donegal Croom. After a brief visit to Marina's bookshop, she attends a social event when Donegal reads aloud some of his poetry. After breaking down, he and Abigail spend the night together, talking - she talks about Adam, he confesses to having had prostate cancer and thereby being impotent. Back home, Abigail hears a message from Gerhardt on her answerphone, asking her to marry him. She promptly dismisses it, but then sees him with the girl in a 'red beret'...

At the same time, Roger Cavanagh is in a car with feminist paralegal Noami Volpe. They visit lawyer Reginald "Boomer" Spires over Death Row client Elroy Jackson Jr, and upbraid him for his lack of professionalism, as they believe his client to be only a victim of the court system. Later, Noami Volpe admits she is pregnant, needs a holiday, and Roger pays for it. When she is back, over dinner she agrees to let him have the child if he will pay good money. Simultaneously, Abigail is said to be soon to marry Gerhardt Ault, and Owen Cutler goes to Florida to identify his wife's corpse - coming to the conclusion it is not hers. As it is, Augusta Cutler has left to delve into Adam's past, after finding out that he was formerly named Francis Xavier Brady. While on her quest, she spots the private detective that her husband has hired to find her, Elias West; after becoming intimate, they scheme her supposed death while she leaves for the north. Under the self-styled name of Elizabeth Eastman, she learns that young Adam had nearly killed his foster father; that he'd been a dyslexic; that he'd lived on a campsite with his family, that his father had left home, and that one night drunk Adam had mistakenly set the mobile home on fire, leaving his mother and sister to die inside the house.

A little later, Marina Troy is back in Salthill-on-Hudson to sell her art pieces; she meets Roger Cavanagh with his baby and they quickly have an affair... At the same time in the Hoffmanns household, Lionel finds out he has AIDS, Camille has now seven dogs, and Lionel, due to his allergy, has to sleep in the guesthouse, until he gets bitten to death by them. Ironically enough, Camille has inherited $3 million from her rich neighbour for taking care of her dog. Meanwhile, Abigail goes to a ballet in New York City with Tamar, Gerhardt's Asian-American adopted daughter, and they get mugged. Finally, Augusta Cutler comes home, and Owen finds himself to be very considerate after all.

== Characters ==
- Adam Berendt, a charismatic sculptor. Formerly named Francis Xavier Brady.
- The Thwaites, the family whose children Adam saved from drowning.
- Marina Troy, a librarian who goes to live in a house that Adam bequeathed to her.
- Roger Cavanagh, Adam's shady lawyer.
- Robin Cavanagh, Roger's teenage daughter.
- Lionel Hoffman, married to Camille. After his affair he finds out he has AIDS and he ends up being killed by Camille's dogs.
- Camille Hoffman, married to Lionel. When her husband leaves she starts looking after dogs, and ends up with seven of them.
- Siri Joio, Lionel's Asian mistress; a massage artist.
- Abigail Des Pres, a divorced mother.
- Jared Tierney, Abigail's teenage son.
- Augusta Cutler, married to Owen. She leaves her husband after making a fuss at the Thwaites. Then she goes on a quest for Adam's real persona, and on the road calls herself Elizabeth Eastman.
- Owen Cutler, married to Augusta.
- Rick Pryde, a petrol station hand, maimed in the 1991 Gulf War.
- Lorene, a girl whom Marina rescues from an abusive boyfriend at Walmart carpark.
- Beatrice Archer, a busybody who visits Camille after she has split up from Lionel.
- Gerhardt Ault, an architect with whom Abigail Des Pres ends up getting engaged.
- Tamar, an Asian American girl whom Gerhardt has adopted.
- Donegal Croom, a renowned poet.
- Noami Volpe, a feminist paralegal whom Roger Cavanagh has to work with. Later she gets pregnant from him and she takes advantage of him.
- Elroy Jackson Jr, a Death Row criminal.
- Reginal Boomer Spires, Elroy Jackson Jr's unconcerned lawyer.
