= Gerben Wiersma =

Dutch gymnastics coach

- Born: 26 April 1977 (age 48)
- Occupation: gymnastics coach

Gerben Wiersma (born 26 April 1977 in Surhuisterveen) is a Dutch artistic gymnastics coach. He was the coach of the KNGU women's national artistic gymnastics team. Claims of physical and emotional abuse against players dating from the years before 2011 were leveled against multiple KNGU coaches in July 2021, including Wiersma. After first being acquitted, he was found guilty of charges in October 2021 without being penalized. He already had decided to resign from his position as coach, however. In 2022 he was appointed national coach of the women selection by the German artistic gymnastics federation.
