= Kathleen Finneran =

American author

Kathleen Finneran (December 3, 1957 - February 14, 2026) was an American author from St. Louis, Missouri. She wrote the book-length family memoir The Tender Land (Houghton-Mifflin, 2000). Finneran received a Whiting Award in 2001 and a Guggenheim Fellowship in 2003.

She taught at Washington University in St. Louis and was a guest professor at the University of Missouri–St. Louis, where she led workshops on memoir and personal essay.

On May 17, 2010, Kathleen Finneran awarded Christopher Bachmann and Tony Minnick from St. Louis University High School, an award for exemplary and outstanding literary work.
