= Gerben Zylstra =

American biochemist

Gerben J. Zylstra (born January 3, 1959) is an American biochemist, currently distinguished professor at Rutgers University and an Elected Fellow of the American Association for the Advancement of Science.
