= Abdelkader Benali =

Moroccan-Dutch writer and journalist

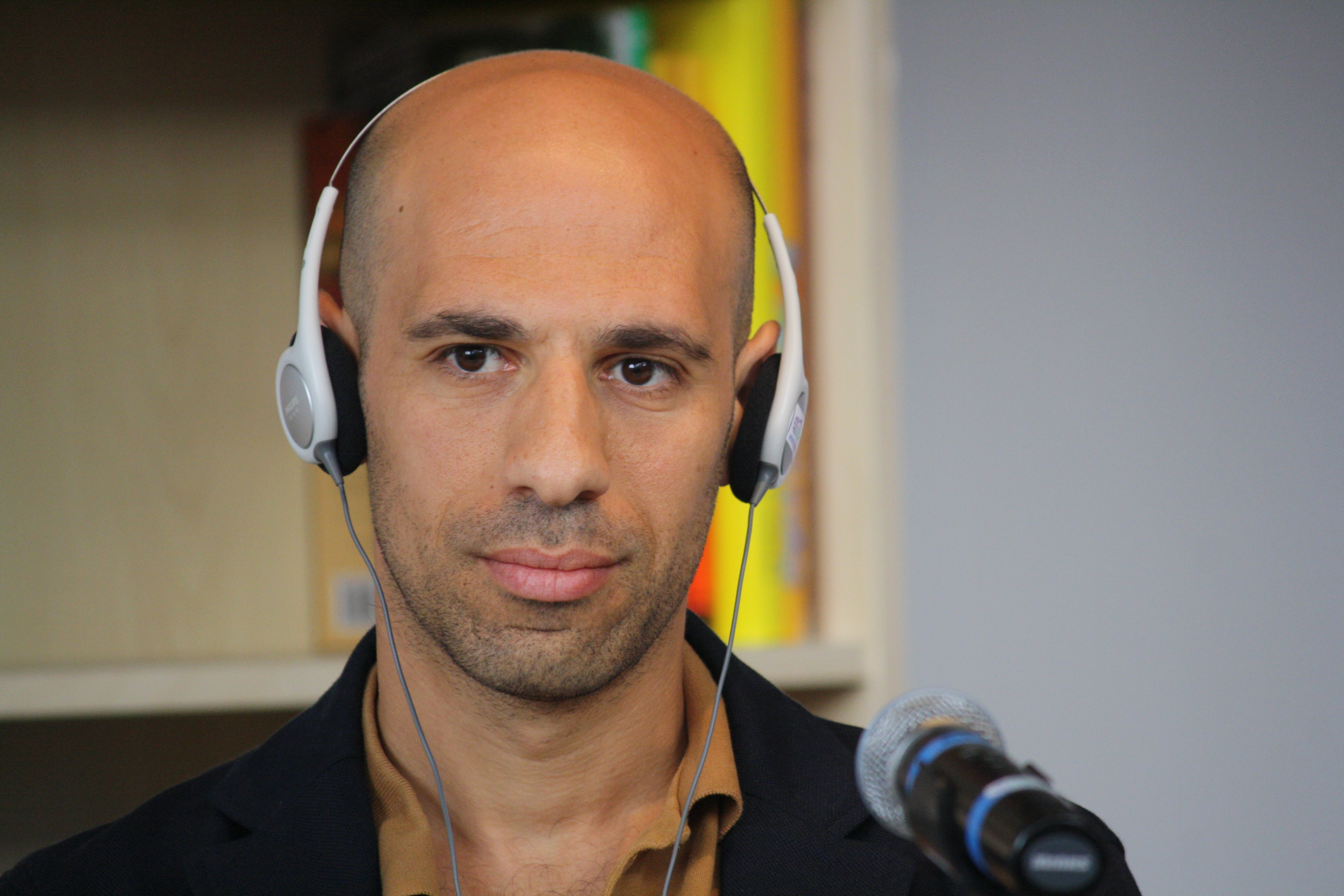
Abdelkader Benali (2011)

Abdelkader Benali (Arabic: عبد القادر بنعلي) is a Moroccan-Dutch writer and journalist.

When he was four years old, he and his family, of Berber background, migrated to The Netherlands and settled in Rotterdam, where his father worked as a butcher. When he was twenty-one his debut novel Bruiloft aan zee (Wedding by the Sea) appeared and was a huge critical and commercial success. It was translated into many languages. He received the Libris Prize for his second novel, De langverwachte ("The Long-Awaited").

In addition to novels and plays, Benali has published essays and reviews in respected newspapers and magazines including De Volkskrant, Vrij Nederland, De Groene Amsterdammer, Esquire and Algemeen Dagblad. Benali is an avid long-distance runner, his personal record being 2:52:19, achieved at the 2007 Rotterdam Marathon. He also wrote a book about his failed attempt to improve his best result, Marathonloper (Marathon Runner).

Abdelkader Benali has mastered Dutch, and speaks Berber and English. He is irreligious, despite his family's Muslim faith and tradition. He uses the Great Replacement conspiracy theory, which is often associated with the far-right, to destill his argument that immigration is a historical, natural and a positive social demographic trend.

== Works (in English translation) ==
- • Abdelkader Benali: Wedding by the sea. Transl. by Susan Massotty. London, Phoenix House, 1999.
